= Redtop Mountain =

Mountain in British Columbia, Canada

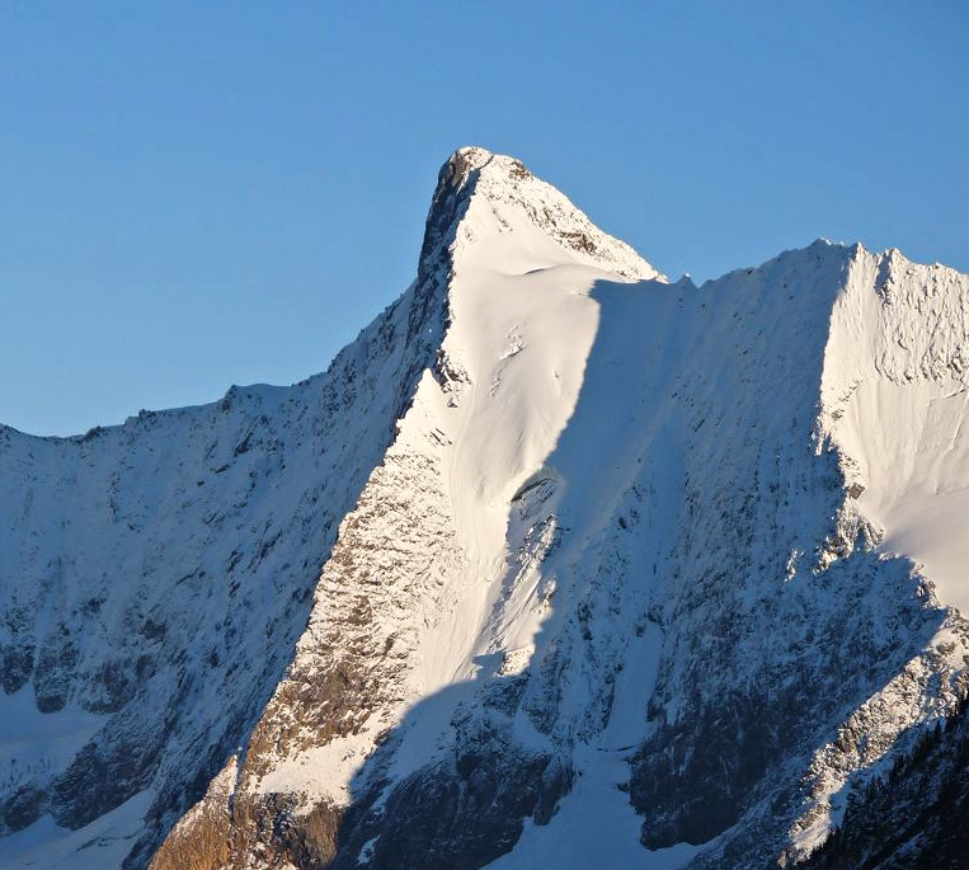
- Redtop Mountain, north aspect

Highest point
- Elevation: 3,156 m (10,354 ft)
- Prominence: 653 m (2,142 ft)
- Parent peak: Truce Mountain (3262 m)
- Listing: Mountains of British Columbia
- Coordinates: 50°19′10″N 116°32′32″W

Geography
- Location within British Columbia Location within Canada
- Location: British Columbia, Canada
- District: Kootenay Land District
- Parent range: Purcell Mountains
- Topo map: NTS 82K7 Duncan Lake

Climbing
- First ascent: 1916

Redtop Mountain is a 3,156-metre (10,354-foot) mountain summit located in the Purcell Mountains of British Columbia, Canada. It is situated 44 km (27 mi) southwest of Invermere, and 49 km (30 mi) north-northeast of Kaslo, on the northern boundary of Purcell Wilderness Conservancy Provincial Park and Protected Area. Nearby peaks include Truce Mountain, 10 km (6.2 mi) to the west, Mount Earl Grey, 1.5 km (0.93 mi) to the northeast, and Jumbo Mountain, 10 km (6.2 mi) to the north. The first ascent of Redtop Mountain was made August 11, 1916, by Albert H. MacCarthy, Elizabeth MacCarthy, and Conrad Kain. Albert MacCarthy would go on to lead the 1925 first ascent of Mount Logan, Canada's highest mountain. The mountain's name was officially adopted June 9, 1960, when approved by the Geographical Names Board of Canada.

== Climate ==
Based on the Köppen climate classification, Redtop Mountain is located in a subarctic climate zone with cold, snowy winters, and mild summers. Temperatures can drop below −20 °C with wind chill factors below −30 °C. Precipitation runoff from the mountain drains southwest into Hamill Creek, a tributary of the Duncan River, whereas most drains into tributaries of Toby Creek, which is a tributary of the Columbia River.

== See also ==
- Geography of British Columbia
