= Mount Earl Grey =

Mountain in British Columbia, Canada

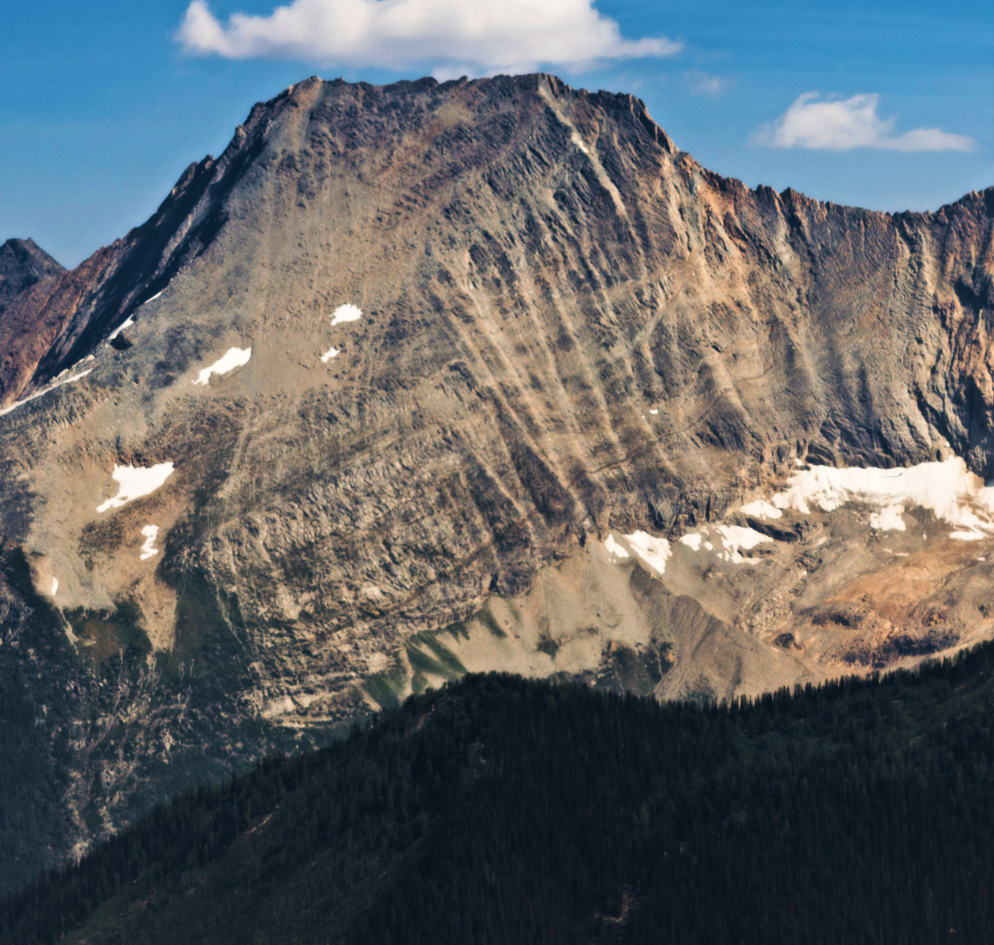
- Mount Earl Grey, north aspect

Highest point
- Elevation: 3,149 m (10,331 ft)
- Prominence: 267 m (876 ft)
- Parent peak: Redtop Mountain (3156 m)
- Listing: Mountains of British Columbia
- Coordinates: 50°19′36″N 116°31′35″W

Geography
- Location within British Columbia Location within Canada
- Country: Canada
- Province: British Columbia
- District: Kootenay Land District
- Parent range: Purcell Mountains
- Topo map: NTS 82K7 Duncan Lake

Climbing
- First ascent: 1928

Mount Earl Grey is a 3,149-metre (10,331-foot) mountain summit located in the Purcell Mountains of British Columbia, Canada. It is situated 42 km (26 mi) southwest of Invermere, and 52 km (32 mi) north-northeast of Kaslo, on the northern boundary of Purcell Wilderness Conservancy Provincial Park and Protected Area. Nearby peaks include Truce Mountain, 12 km (7.5 mi) to the west, Redtop Mountain, 1.5 km (0.93 mi) to the southwest, and Jumbo Mountain, 8.5 km (5.3 mi) to the north. The mountain was named in 1915 in association with Earl Grey Pass which is 8 km (5.0 mi) south of the mountain. In turn, the pass was named for Albert Grey, 4th Earl Grey (1851-1917), the Governor General of Canada from 1904 through 1911, who visited this pass during horseback camping trips in 1907 and 1908. The mountain's name was officially adopted March 31, 1924, when approved by the Geographical Names Board of Canada. The first ascent of Mount Earl Grey was made July 16, 1928, by O. E. Cromwell, J. G. Hillhouse, J. Monroe Thorington, and Conrad Kain.

== Climate ==
Based on the Köppen climate classification, Mount Earl Grey is located in a subarctic climate zone with cold, snowy winters, and mild summers. Temperatures can drop below −20 °C with wind chill factors below −30 °C. Precipitation runoff from the mountain drains into tributaries of Toby Creek, which in turn is a tributary of the Columbia River.

== See also ==
- Geography of British Columbia
