= Mount Macbeth (Purcells) =

Mountain in British Columbia, Canada

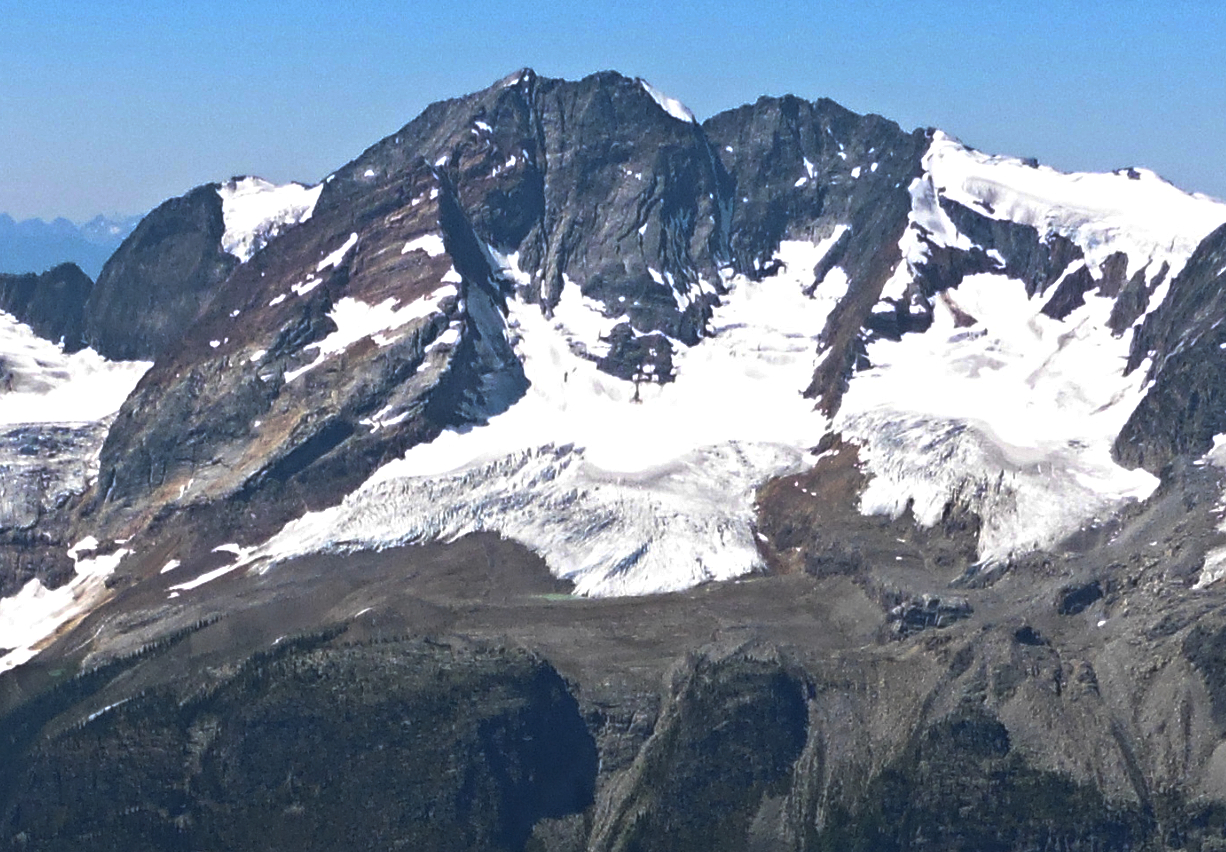
- Mount Macbeth, east aspect

Highest point
- Elevation: 3,059 m (10,036 ft)
- Prominence: 415 m (1,362 ft)
- Parent peak: Eyebrow Peak (3362 m)
- Coordinates: 50°23′22″N 116°45′51″W

Geography
- Location within British Columbia Location within Canada
- Location: British Columbia, Canada
- District: Kootenay Land District
- Parent range: Purcell Mountains
- Topo map: NTS 82K7 Duncan Lake

Climbing
- First ascent: 1960 A. Maki, R.C. West

Mount Macbeth is a 3,059-metre (10,036-foot) mountain summit located in the Macbeth Group of the Purcell Mountains in British Columbia, Canada. It is situated 52 km (32 mi) north of Kaslo, and its nearest higher peak is Truce Mountain, 10.94 km (6.80 mi) to the south-southeast. The first ascent of the mountain was made in 1960 by A. Maki and Robert C. West via the north face. The peak was named for the character in William Shakespeare's Macbeth. The name follows the Macbeth-theme of features surrounding the Macbeth Icefield, such as Mount Lady Macbeth, Mount Macduff, Mount Fleance, and Mount Banquo. The Macbeth name was submitted December 1960 by Robert West, who led a mountaineering party in the area. The mountain's name was officially adopted July 17, 1962, by the Geographical Names Board of Canada.

== Climate ==
Based on the Köppen climate classification, Mount Macbeth is located in a subarctic climate zone with cold, snowy winters, and mild summers. Temperatures can drop below −20 °C with wind chill factors below −30 °C. Precipitation runoff from Mount Macbeth and meltwater from its surrounding glaciers drains into tributaries of the Duncan River.

== See also ==
- List of mountains of Canada
- Geography of British Columbia
