= Mount Monica =

Mountain in British Columbia, Canada

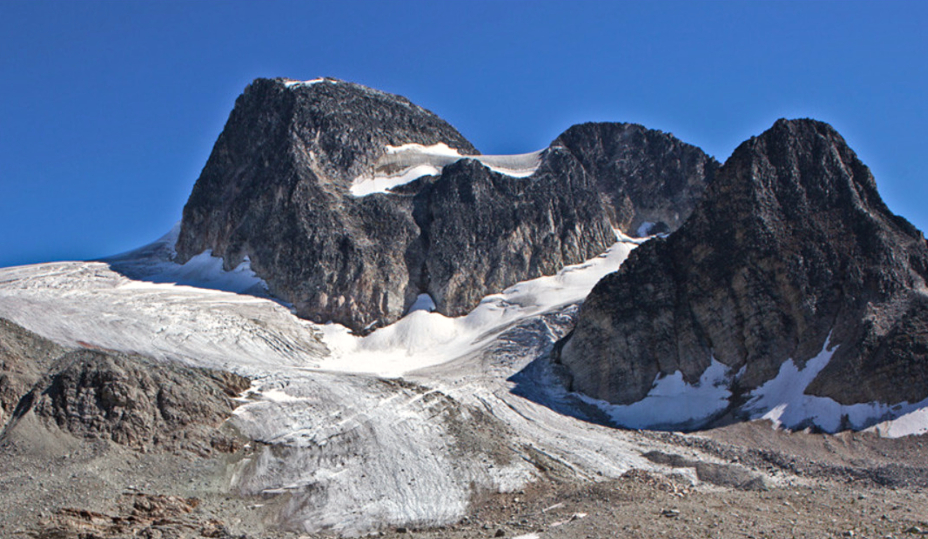
- Mount Monica, north aspect

Highest point
- Elevation: 3,072 m (10,079 ft)
- Prominence: 392 m (1,286 ft)
- Parent peak: Jumbo Mountain (3437 m)
- Listing: Mountains of British Columbia
- Coordinates: 50°25′49″N 116°40′58″W

Geography
- Location within British Columbia
- Interactive map of Mount Monica
- Location: British Columbia, Canada
- District: Kootenay Land District
- Parent range: Purcell Mountains
- Topo map: NTS 82K7 Duncan Lake

Climbing
- First ascent: 1911 Coffin, Harnden, Poorman
- Easiest route: class 3 Southeast Ridge

Mount Monica is a 3,072-metre (10,079-foot) mountain summit located in the Purcell Mountains in southeast British Columbia, Canada. It is situated 56 km (35 mi) north of Kaslo, 48 km (30 mi) west of Invermere, immediately south of Starbird Pass, 7 km (4.3 mi) east of Mount Macduff, and its nearest higher peak is Jumbo Mountain, 9 km (5.6 mi) to the east. The first ascent of the mountain was made in August 1911 by E. W. Harnden, M. Coffin, and J. Poorman via the southeast ridge. The peak was named by Edward Warren Harnden after his mother. The mountain's name was officially adopted June 9, 1960, by the Geographical Names Board of Canada.

== Climate ==
Based on the Köppen climate classification, Mount Monica is located in a subarctic climate zone with cold, snowy winters, and mild summers. Temperatures can drop below −20 °C with wind chill factors below −30 °C. Precipitation runoff from Mount Monica and meltwater from its surrounding glaciers drains west into Glacier Creek which is a tributary of the Duncan River, or east into Horsethief Creek, which is a tributary of the Columbia River.

== Climbing Routes ==
Established climbing routes on Mount Monica:

- Southeast Ridge - class 3 First ascent 1911
- Southwest Ridge - class 4 First ascent 1994

== See also ==
- Geography of British Columbia
- Geology of British Columbia
