= Howser Spire =

Mountain in British Columbia, Canada

Howser Spire, The Bugaboos
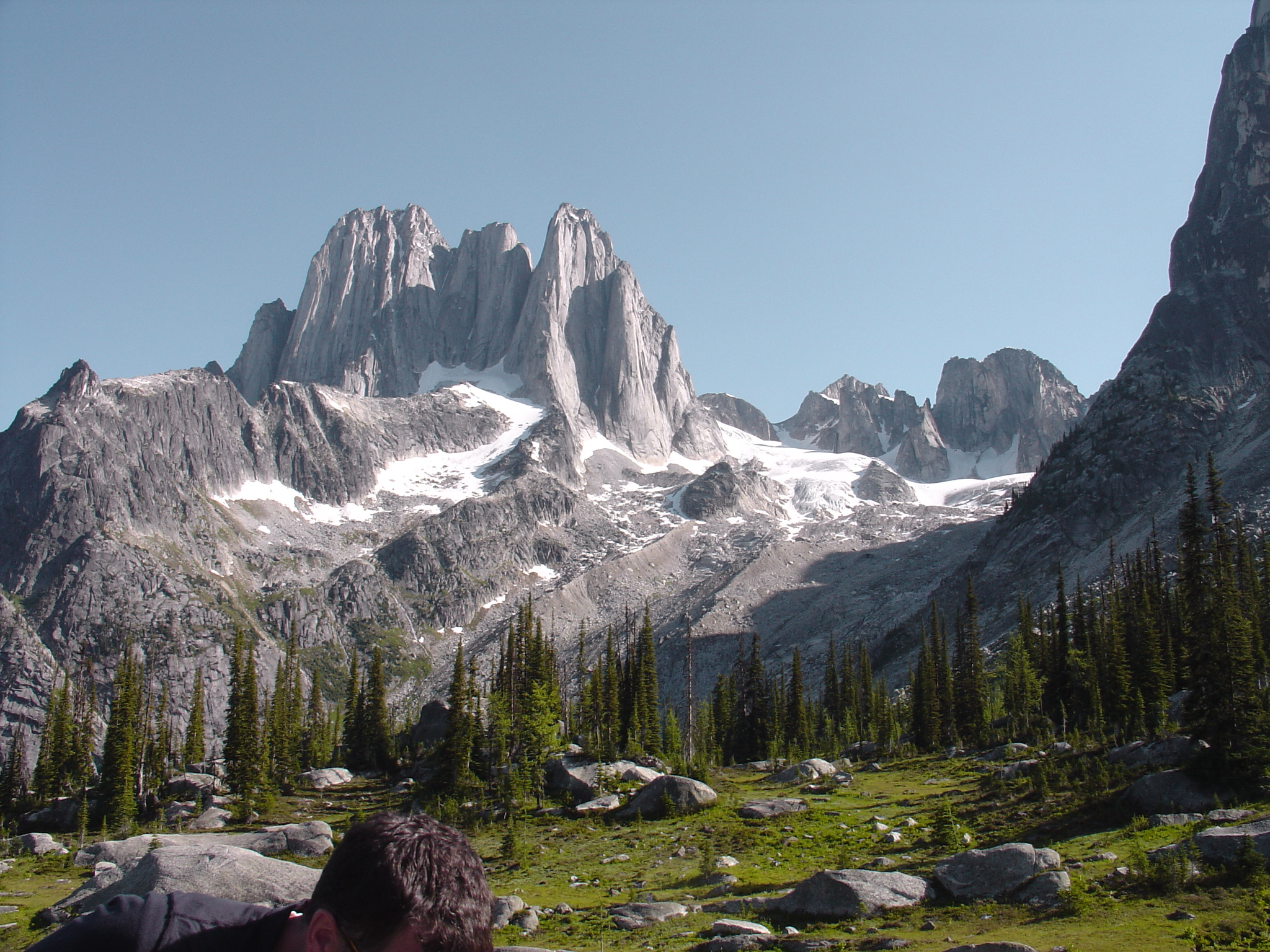

Highest point
- Elevation: 3,412 m (11,194 ft)
- Prominence: 1,299 m (4,262 ft)
- Listing: Mountains of British Columbia; Canada highest major peaks 44th
- Coordinates: 50°43′47″N 116°48′48″W

Geography
- Location within British Columbia
- Country: Canada
- Province: British Columbia
- District: Kootenay Land District
- Protected area: Bugaboo Provincial Park
- Parent range: Purcell Mountains, East Kootenay
- Topo map: NTS 82K10 Howser Creek

Geology
- Mountain type: Granite

Climbing
- First ascent: 1916; Conrad Kain; Albert MacCarthy; E. MacCarthy; J. Vincent; Henry Frind

Howser Spire, or Howser Spire Massif, is a group of three distinct granite peaks, and the highest mountain of the Canadian Bugaboo Spires. The mountain is located at the southwest corner of the Vowell Glacier, within the Bugaboo mountain range in the Purcell Mountains, a subrange of British Columbia's Columbia Mountains, The highest of the three spires is the North Tower at 3,412 m (11,194 ft), the Central Tower the lowest, and the South Tower is slightly lower than the North at 3,292 m (10,801 ft).

Howser Spire is named after the town of Howser on Duncan Lake and Howser Creek.

The first ascent of the North Tower was made in August 1916 by Conrad Kain, Albert MacCarthy, E. MacCarthy, J. Vincent and Henry Frind.

The Beckey-Chouinard/West Buttress route is recognized in the historic climbing text Fifty Classic Climbs of North America and considered a classic around the world.

== Climate ==
Based on the Köppen climate classification, Howser Spire is located in a subarctic climate zone with cold, snowy winters, and mild summers. Winter temperatures can drop below −20 °C with wind chill factors below −30 °C. This climate supports the Vowell Glacier on the peak's north slope.

== Nearby ==
- Brenta Spire
- Bugaboo Spire (3,204 m)
- Conrad Kain hut
- Crescent Towers
- Hound's Tooth
- Marmolata Spire
- Pigeon Spire (3,156 m)
- Snowpatch Spire (3,084 m)

== Gallery ==
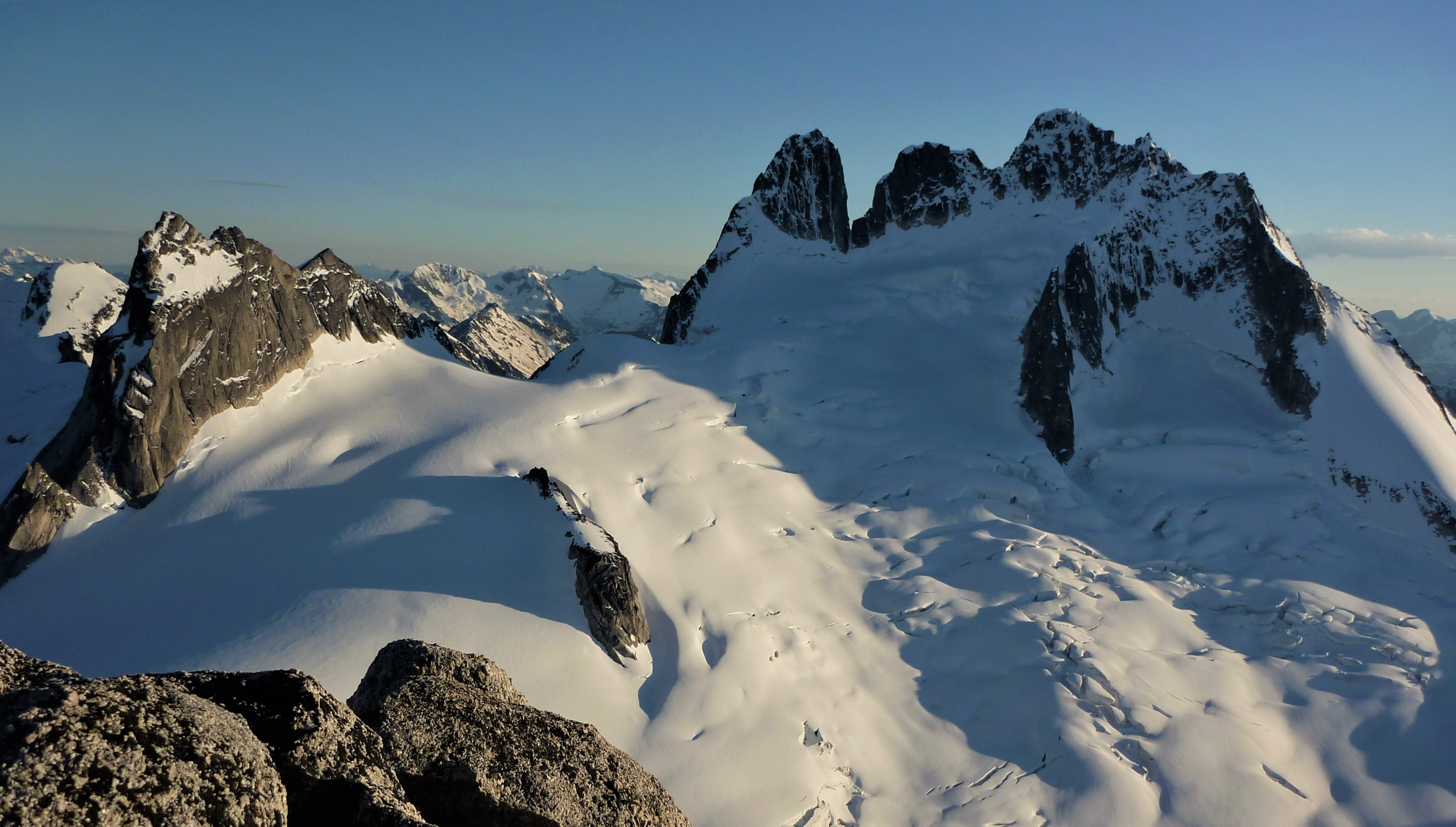
North aspect of Howser Spire (right) above Vowell Glacier viewed from Bugaboo Spire. (Pigeon Spire to left)

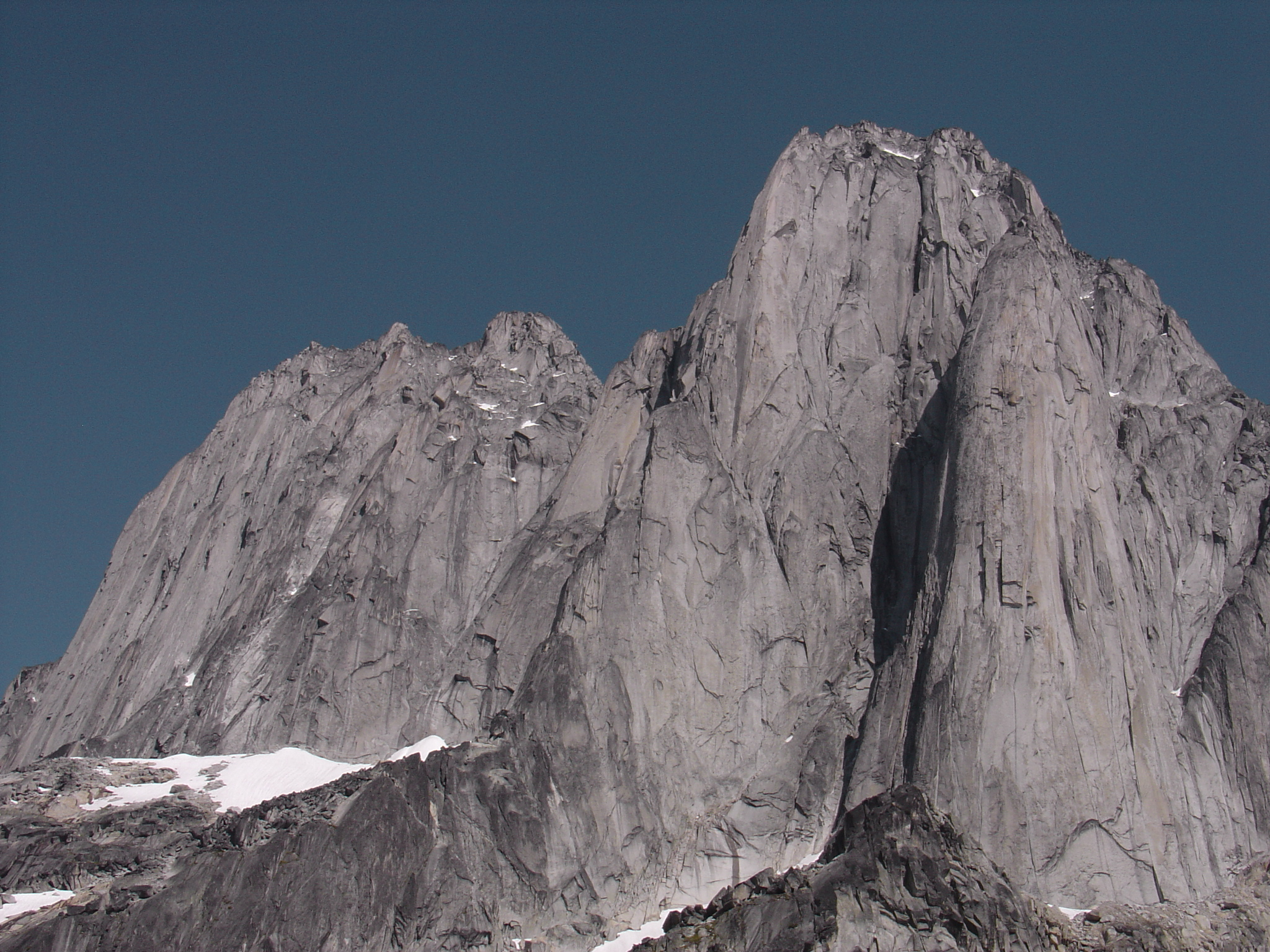
Under the spire

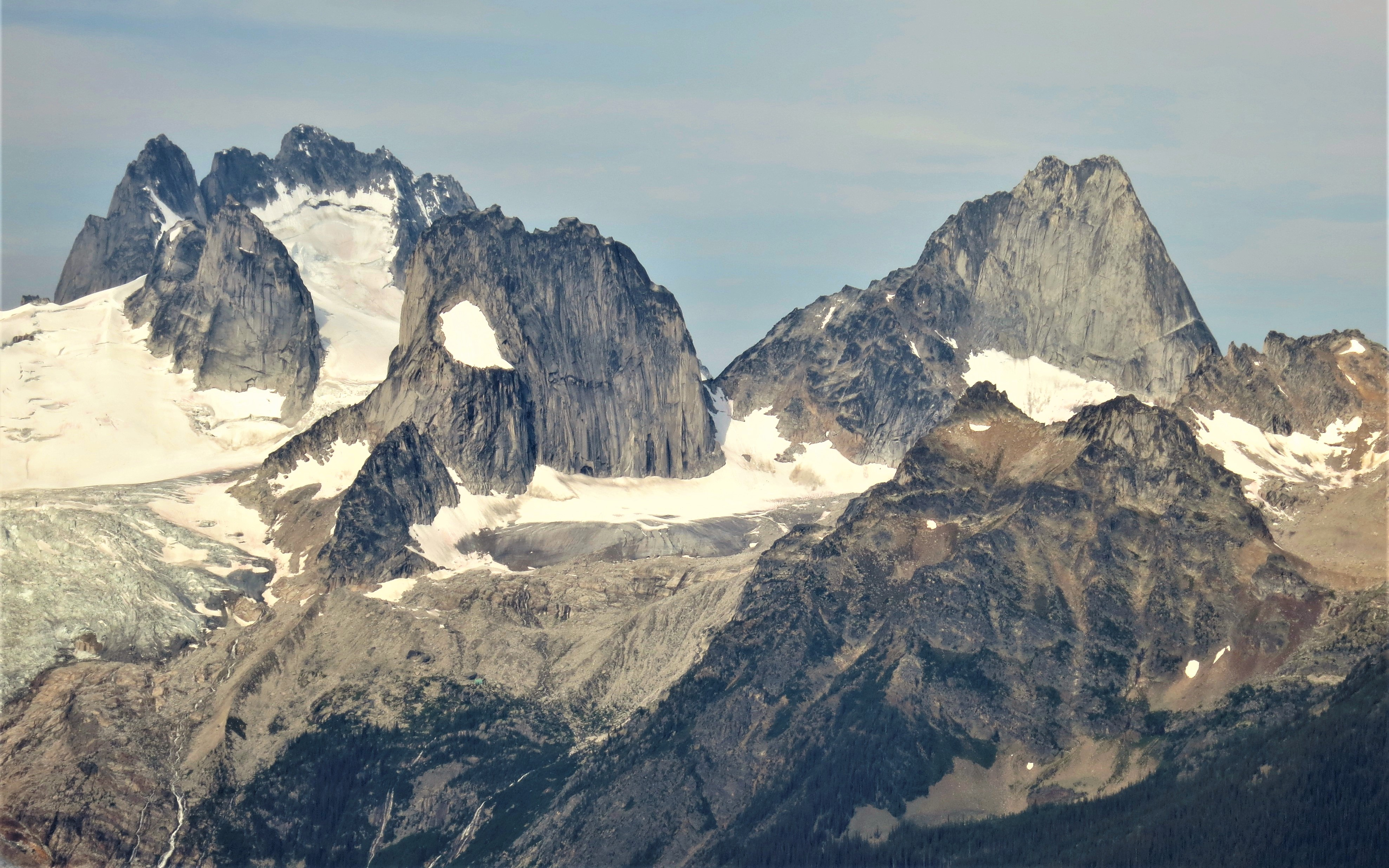
Howser Spire (upper left), Snowpatch Spire (left of center), Bugaboo Spire (upper right), Eastpost Spire (lower right). Camera pointed west.

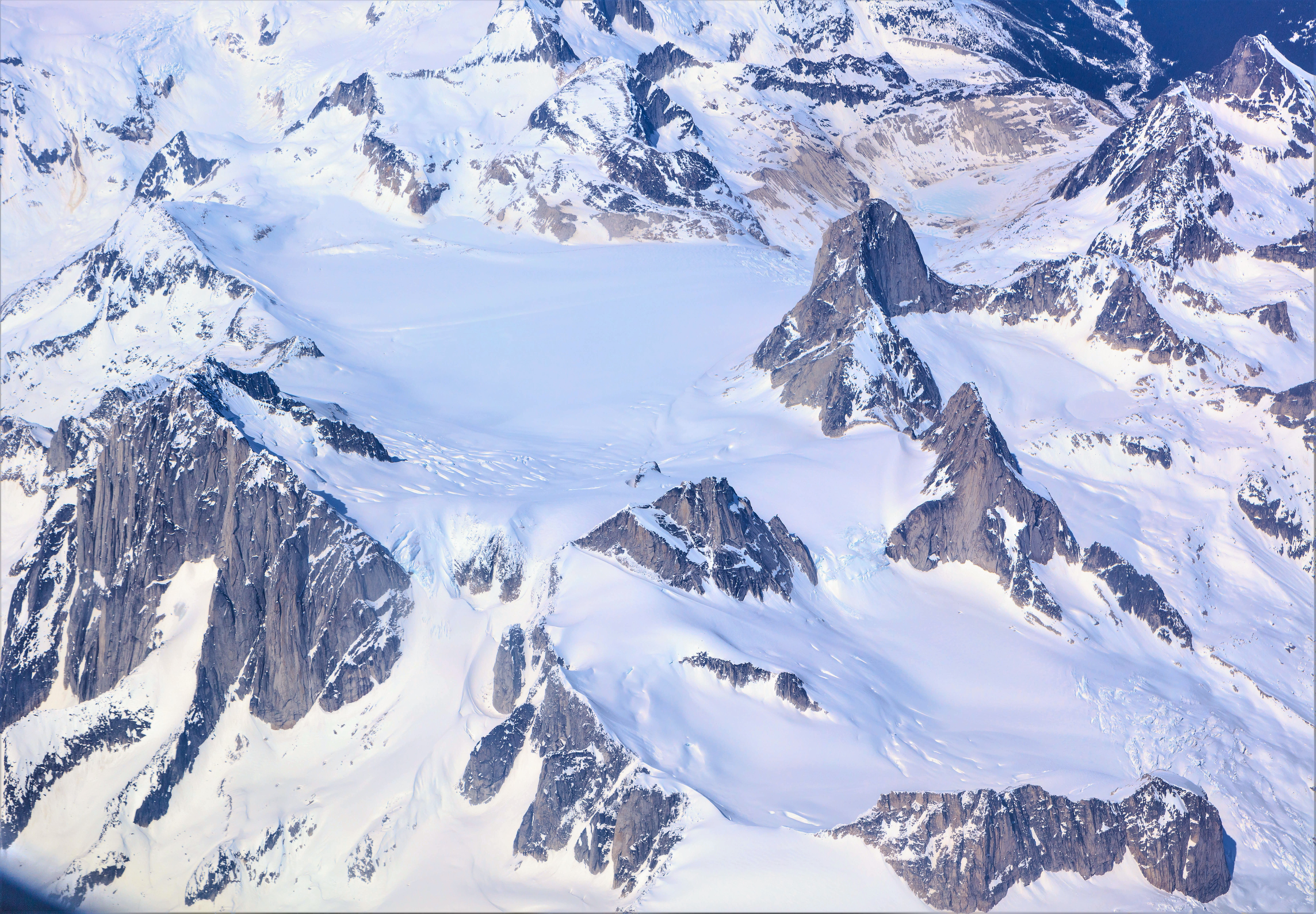
Howser Spire (left) viewed from airliner
