= The Lieutenants =

Mountain peaks in British Columbia, Canada

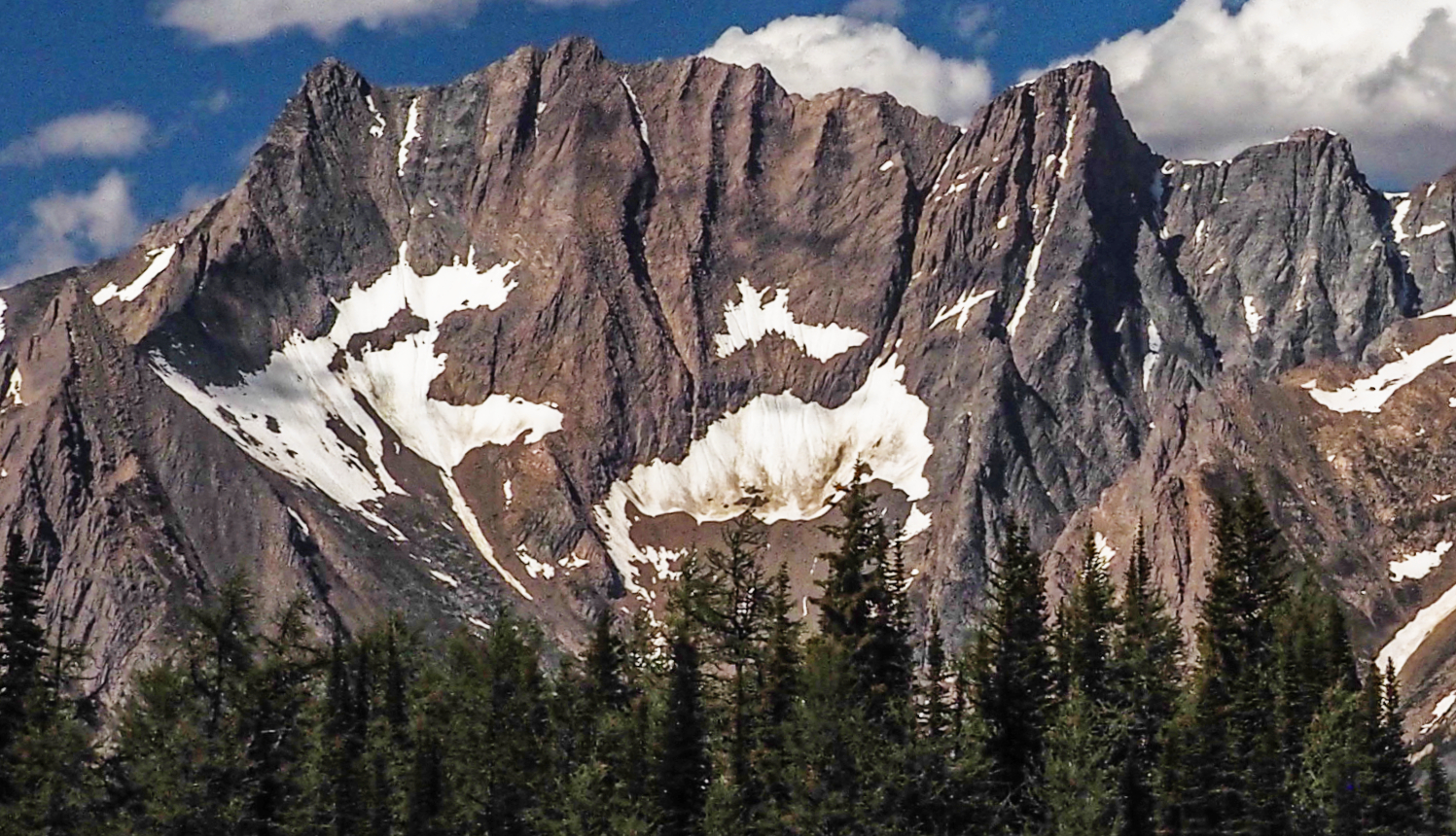
- The Lieutenants, south aspect

Highest point
- Elevation: 3,270 m (10,730 ft)
- Prominence: 722 m (2,369 ft)
- Listing: Mountains of British Columbia
- Coordinates: 50°24′59″N 116°35′20″W

Geography
- Location within British Columbia Location within Canada
- Interactive map of The Lieutenants
- Location: British Columbia, Canada
- District: Kootenay Land District
- Parent range: Purcell Mountains
- Topo map: NTS 82K7 Duncan Lake

The Lieutenants, elevation 3,270 metres (10,728 ft), are peaks located in the Purcell Mountains of southeast British Columbia, Canada. It is situated 40 km (25 mi) west of Invermere on the boundary of Jumbo Glacier Mountain Resort Municipality. The nearest higher peak is Karnak Mountain, 2 km (1.2 mi) to the southeast, and Commander Mountain is set 2.12 km (1.32 mi) to the east. The mountain's name was officially adopted July 17, 1962, when approved by the Geographical Names Board of Canada.

Based on the Köppen climate classification, The Lieutenants is located in a subarctic climate zone with cold, snowy winters, and mild summers. Temperatures can drop below −20 °C with wind chill factors below −30 °C. Precipitation runoff from the mountain drains into headwaters of Jumbo Creek and Horsethief Creek, both tributaries of the Columbia River.

== Gallery ==
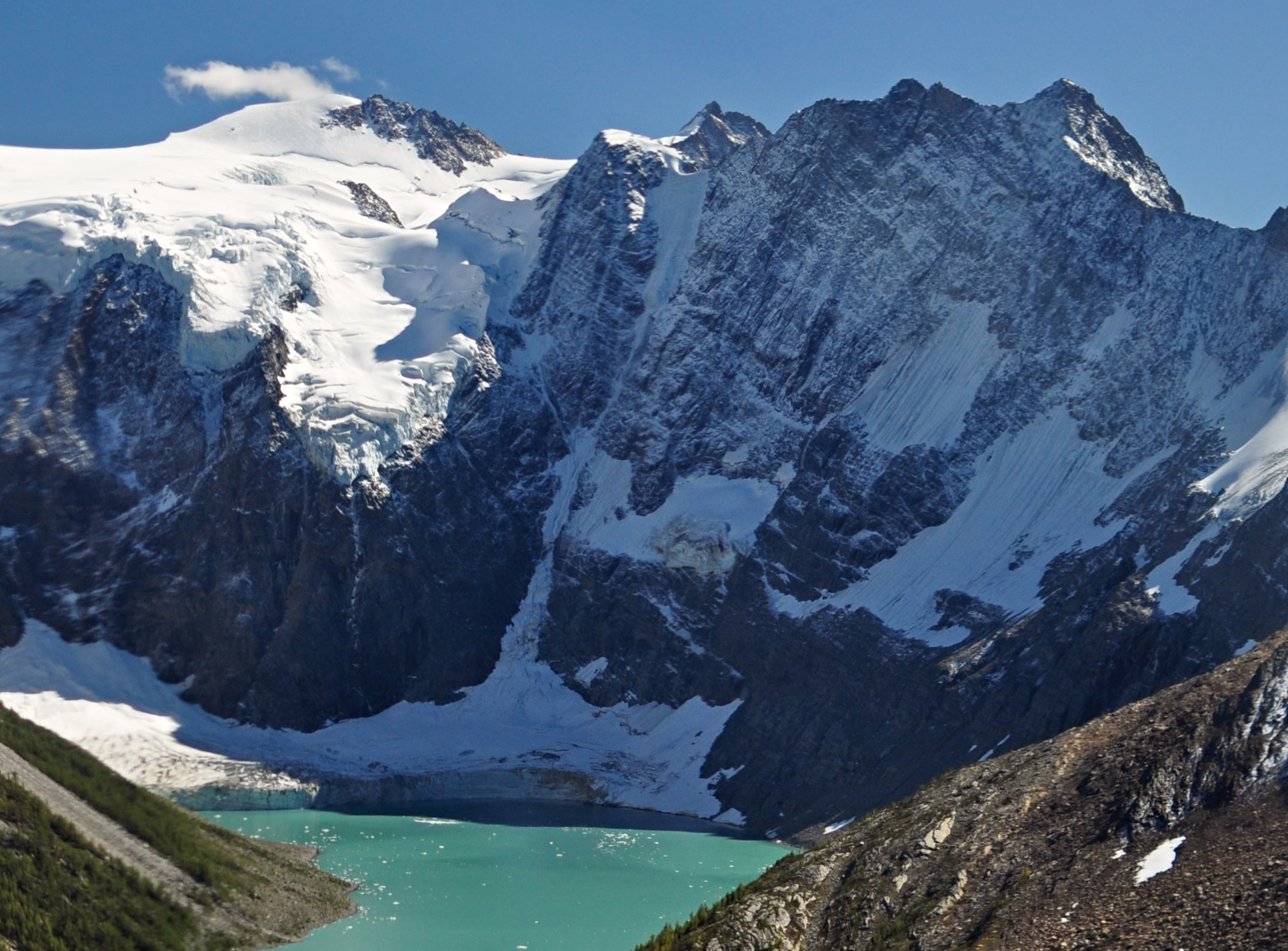
Jumbo Mountain (left), The Lieutenants (right) north aspect

== See also ==
- Geography of British Columbia
