= Commander Mountain =

Mountain in British Columbia, Canada

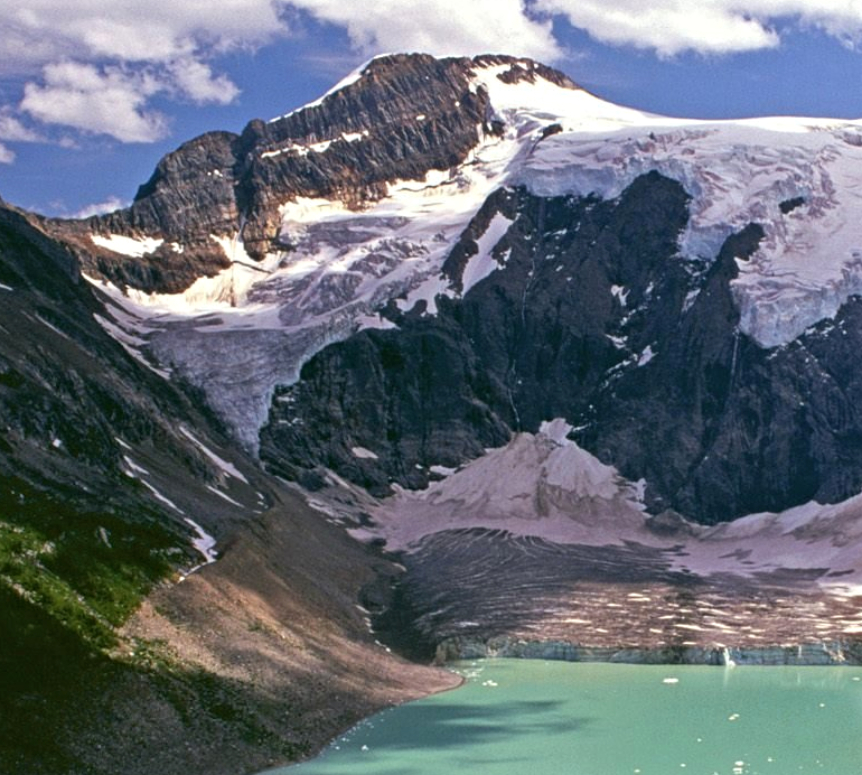
- Commander Mountain, northwest aspect

Highest point
- Elevation: 3,371 m (11,060 ft)
- Prominence: 91 m (299 ft)
- Parent peak: Jumbo Mountain (3437 m)
- Listing: Mountains of British Columbia
- Coordinates: 50°24′58″N 116°33′33″W

Geography
- Location within British Columbia Location within Canada
- Interactive map of Commander Mountain
- Location: British Columbia, Canada
- District: Kootenay Land District
- Parent range: Purcell Mountains
- Topo map: NTS 82K7 Duncan Lake

Climbing
- First ascent: 1915
- Easiest route: North ridge

Commander Mountain is a 3,371-metre (11,060 ft) glaciated mountain summit located 42 km (26 mi) west-southwest of Invermere in the Purcell Mountains of southeast British Columbia, Canada. It is the seventh-highest mountain in the Purcells. The nearest higher peak is Jumbo Mountain, 2 km (1.2 mi) to the south, and The Lieutenants is set 2.12 km (1.32 mi) to the west.

== History ==
The first ascent of Commander Mountain was made August 4, 1915, by A.H. & E.L. MacCarthy, M. & Winthrop E. Stone, B. Shultz, and Conrad Kain via the north ridge. The peak was named in 1915 by Winthrop E. Stone, member of the first ascent party. The mountain's toponym was officially adopted July 17, 1962, by the Geographical Names Board of Canada.

== Climate ==
Based on the Köppen climate classification, Commander Mountain is located in a subarctic climate zone with cold, snowy winters, and mild summers. Winter temperatures can drop below −20 °C with wind chill factors below −30 °C. This climate supports the Jumbo Glacier on its west slope, and Commander Glacier on the east slope. Precipitation runoff from the mountain and meltwater from its surrounding glaciers drains into Horsethief Creek which is a tributary of the Columbia River.

== Climbing Routes ==
Established climbing routes on Commander Mountain:

- North Ridge - class 2-3 - First ascent 1915
- South Ridge - class 3 - FA 1928 (Kate Gardiner, Byles, Feuz)

== See also ==
- Geography of British Columbia
