= Northpost Spire =

Mountain in British Columbia, Canada

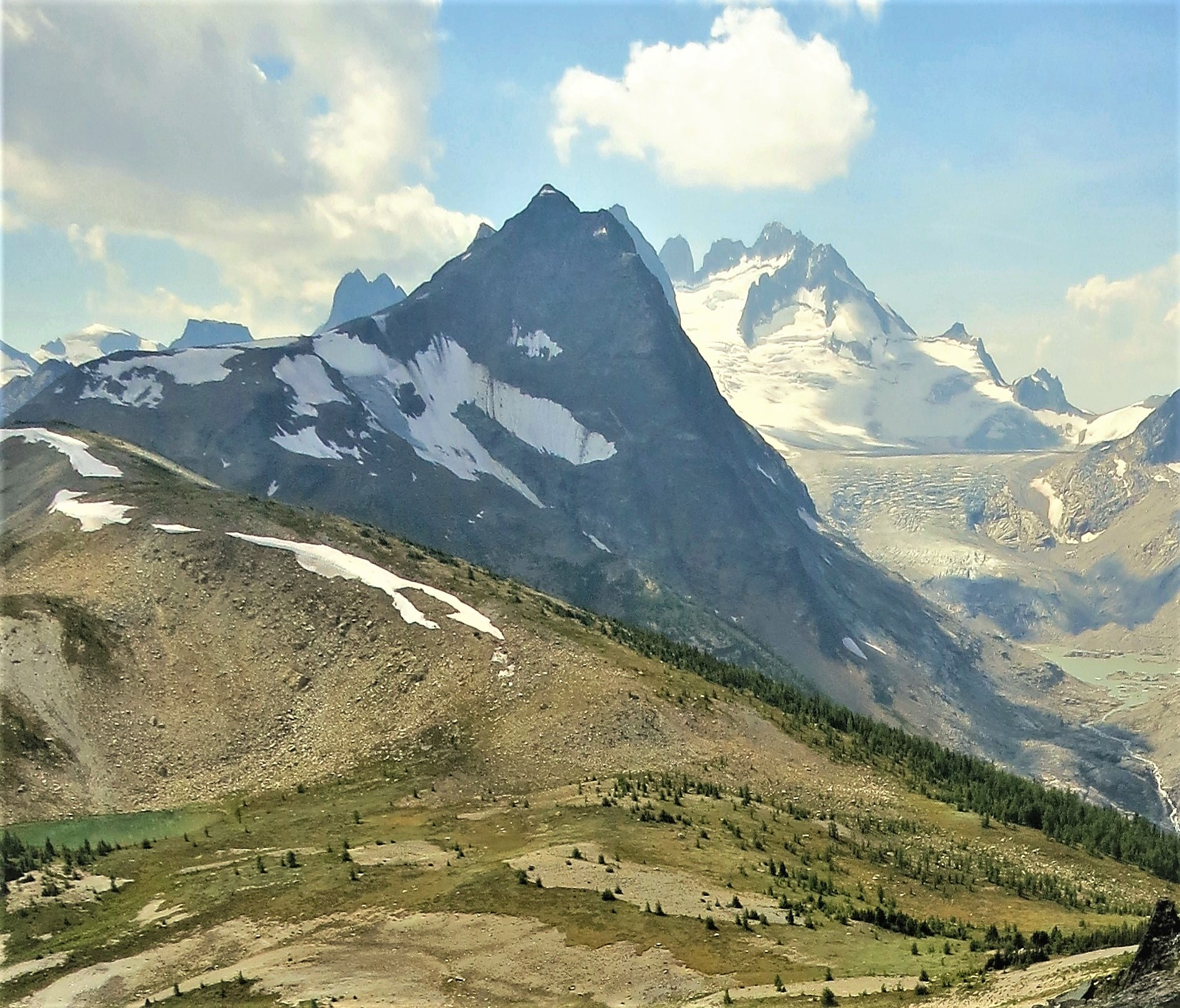
- Northeast aspect, centered (Howser Spire in the background)

Highest point
- Elevation: 2,911 m (9,551 ft)
- Prominence: 119 m (390 ft)
- Parent peak: Brenta Spire (2,958 m)
- Isolation: 1.01 km (0.63 mi)
- Listing: Mountains of British Columbia
- Coordinates: 50°46′07″N 116°46′05″W

Geography
- Location within British Columbia Location within Canada
- Country: Canada
- Province: British Columbia
- District: Kootenay Land District
- Protected area: Bugaboo Provincial Park
- Parent range: Purcell Mountains; The Bugaboos
- Topo map: NTS 82K15 Bugaboo Creek

Geology
- Rock age: 135 Million years ago
- Rock type: Granodiorite

Climbing
- First ascent: August 1938

Northpost Spire is a 2,911-metre (9,551-foot) peak in British Columbia, Canada.

== Description ==
Northpost Spire is located in The Bugaboos, along the east side of the Vowell Glacier at the south end of Bugaboo Provincial Park. Precipitation runoff from Northpost's north slope drains into the headwaters of Vowell Creek → Bobbie Burns Creek → Spillimacheen River → Columbia River; and from the south slope to Cobalt Lake → Bugaboo Creek → Columbia River. Northpost Spire is more notable for its steep rise above local terrain than for its absolute elevation as topographic relief is significant with the summit rising 1,100 meters (3,309 ft) above Vowell Creek in 2 km (1.2 mi). The nearest higher neighbor is Brenta Spire, 1 km (0.62 mi) to the south.

== History ==
The peak's name was applied by James Monroe Thorington in 1930, and the toponym was officially adopted on November 15, 1962, by the Geographical Names Board of Canada. The first ascent of the summit was accomplished in 1938 by Dr. I. A. Richards and his wife Dorothy Pilley Richards. The first ascent of the north face was made on August 20, 1966, by Fred Beckey and Jerry Fuller.

== Climate ==
Based on the Köppen climate classification, Northpost Spire is located in a subarctic climate zone with cold, snowy winters, and mild summers. Winter temperatures can drop below −20 °C with wind chill factors below −30 °C. This climate supports the Vowell Glacier below the peak's west slope.

== See also ==
- The Bugaboos
- Geography of British Columbia
