= Eyebrow Peak =

Mountain in the country of Canada

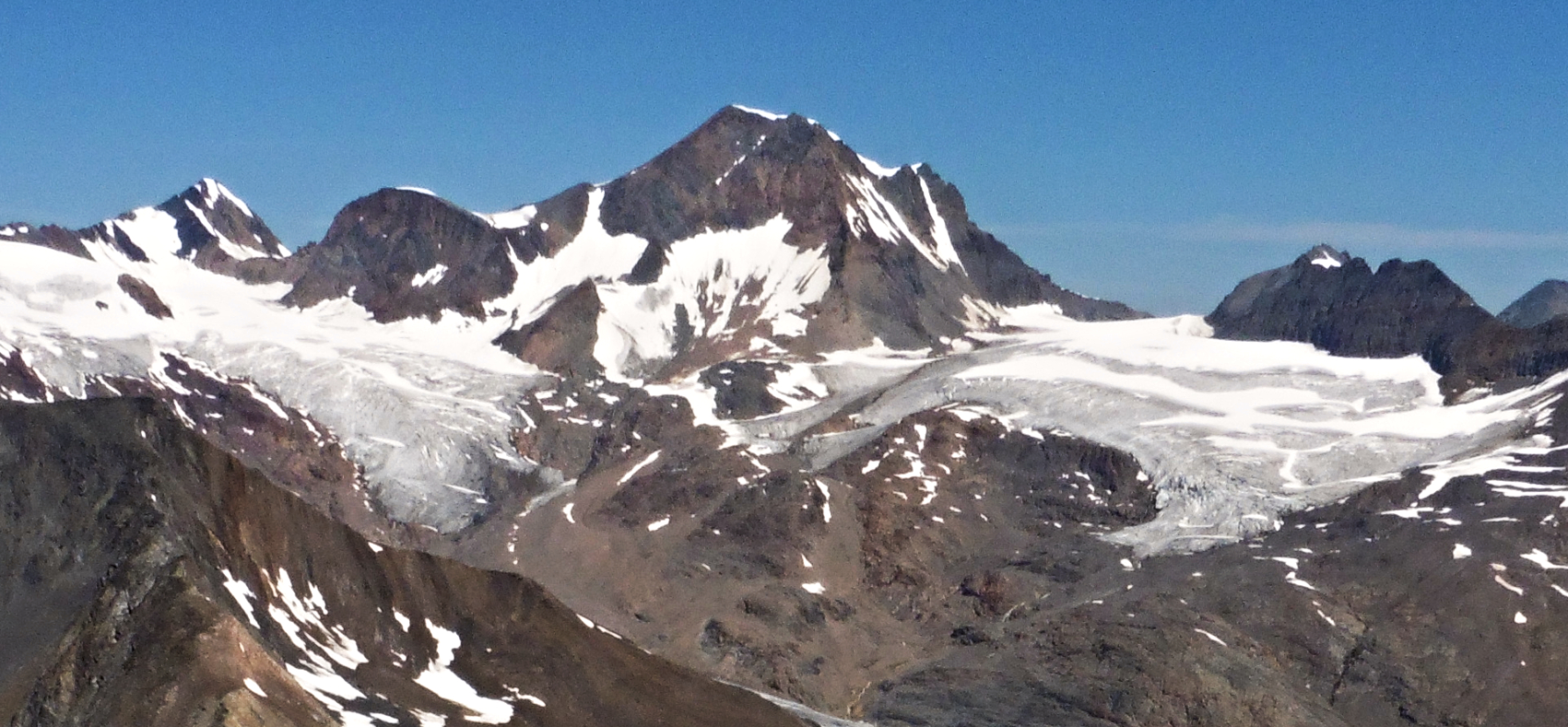
- Eyebrow Peak, south aspect

Highest point
- Elevation: 3,362 m (11,030 ft)
- Prominence: 901 m (2,956 ft)
- Parent peak: Commander Mountain (3371 m)
- Listing: Mountains of British Columbia
- Coordinates: 50°28′57″N 116°40′53″W

Geography
- Location within British Columbia Location within Canada
- Interactive map of Eyebrow Peak
- Location: British Columbia, Canada
- District: Kootenay Land District
- Parent range: Purcell Mountains
- Topo map: NTS 82K7 Duncan Lake

Climbing
- First ascent: 1914 Brown, Harnden, Nettleton, Parson
- Easiest route: class 3

Eyebrow Peak is a prominent 3,362-metre (11,030-foot) glaciated mountain summit located in the Purcell Mountains in southeast British Columbia, Canada. It is the ninth-highest peak in the Purcells. It is situated 28 km (17 mi) south of The Bugaboos, 44 km (27 mi) west of Invermere, 6 km (3.7 mi) north of Mount Monica, and 18 km (11 mi) east of Duncan Lake. Its nearest higher peak is Commander Mountain, 11.4 km (7.1 mi) to the southeast. The first ascent of the mountain was made in 1914 by Edward Warren Harnden, D. Brown, L. Nettleton, and E. Parson via the west slopes. The name Eyebrow Peak came about by Arthur Oliver Wheeler in 1910 when viewing two broad rock scars near the summit, and their arrangement in connection with the surrounding snow created the appearance of enormous eyebrows. However, using the same sightings as Wheeler, Professor Peter Robinson showed that Wheeler actually saw Mount Farnham. Poor weather conditions led to Wheeler's error, and the Eyebrow moniker was then moved to its present location. The mountain's name was officially adopted June 9, 1960, by the Geographical Names Board of Canada.

== Climate ==
Based on the Köppen climate classification, Eyebrow Peak is located in a subarctic climate zone with cold, snowy winters, and mild summers. Temperatures can drop below −20 °C with wind chill factors below −30 °C. Precipitation runoff from Eyebrow Peak and meltwater from its surrounding glaciers drains into Horsethief Creek, which is a tributary of the Columbia River.

== Climbing Routes ==
Established climbing routes on Eyebrow Peak:

- West Slopes - class 3 First ascent 1914
- Southwest Face - First ascent 1928
- West Face - First ascent 1928
- South Ridge - First ascent 1928

== See also ==
- Geography of British Columbia
- Geology of British Columbia
