= Karnak Mountain =

Mountain in the British Columbia, Canada

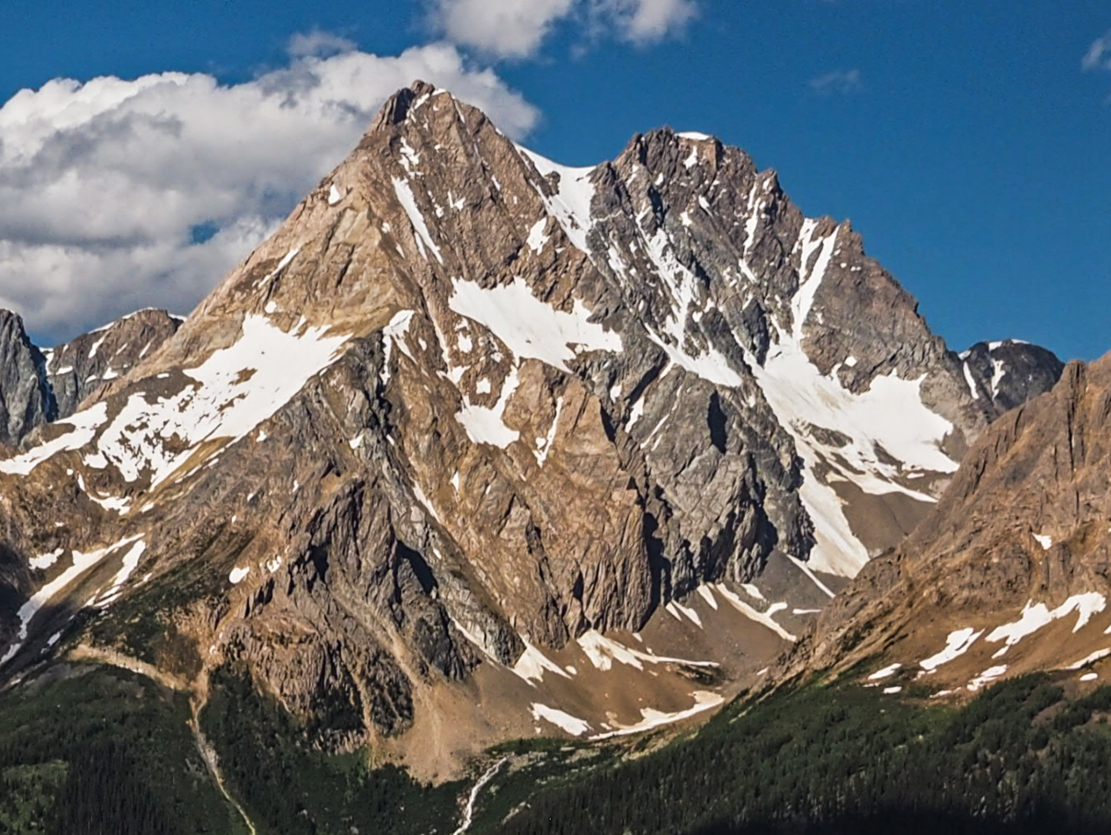
- Karnak-Jumbo Massif, southwest aspect. Karnak (left), Jumbo (right)

Highest point
- Elevation: 3,411 m (11,191 ft)
- Prominence: 111 m (364 ft)
- Parent peak: Jumbo Mountain (3437 m)
- Listing: Mountains of British Columbia
- Coordinates: 50°24′04″N 116°34′29″W

Geography
- Location within British Columbia Location within Canada
- Interactive map of Karnak Mountain
- Location: British Columbia, Canada
- District: Kootenay Land District
- Parent range: Purcell Mountains
- Topo map: NTS 82K7 Duncan Lake

Climbing
- First ascent: 1915

Karnak Mountain is a 3,411-metre (11,191 ft) mountain summit located 42 km (26 mi) west-southwest of Invermere in the Purcell Mountains of southeast British Columbia, Canada. The nearest higher peak is Jumbo Mountain, 0.79 km (0.49 mi) to the east-northeast, and The Lieutenants is set 2 km (1.2 mi) to the northwest. Karnak and Jumbo form a double summit massif which is the second-highest mountain in the Purcells.

== History ==
The first ascent of Karnak Mountain was made August 14, 1915, by A.H. & E.L. MacCarthy, Dr. and Mrs. Winthrop Stone, and Conrad Kain via the southwest slopes. The peak was named in 1910 by Stone and MacCarthy after Karnak, the Egyptian Temple Complex. The mountain's toponym was officially adopted June 9, 1960, by the Geographical Names Board of Canada.

== Climate ==
Based on the Köppen climate classification, Karnak Mountain is located in a subarctic climate zone with cold, snowy winters, and mild summers. Winter temperatures can drop below −20 °C with wind chill factors below −30 °C. Precipitation runoff from the mountain drains into Jumbo Creek which is a tributary of the Columbia River.

== Climbing Routes ==
Established climbing routes on Karnak Mountain:

- Southwest Slopes - First ascent 1915
- Northeast Face - First ascent 1960
- West Face - First ascent 1975

== Gallery ==
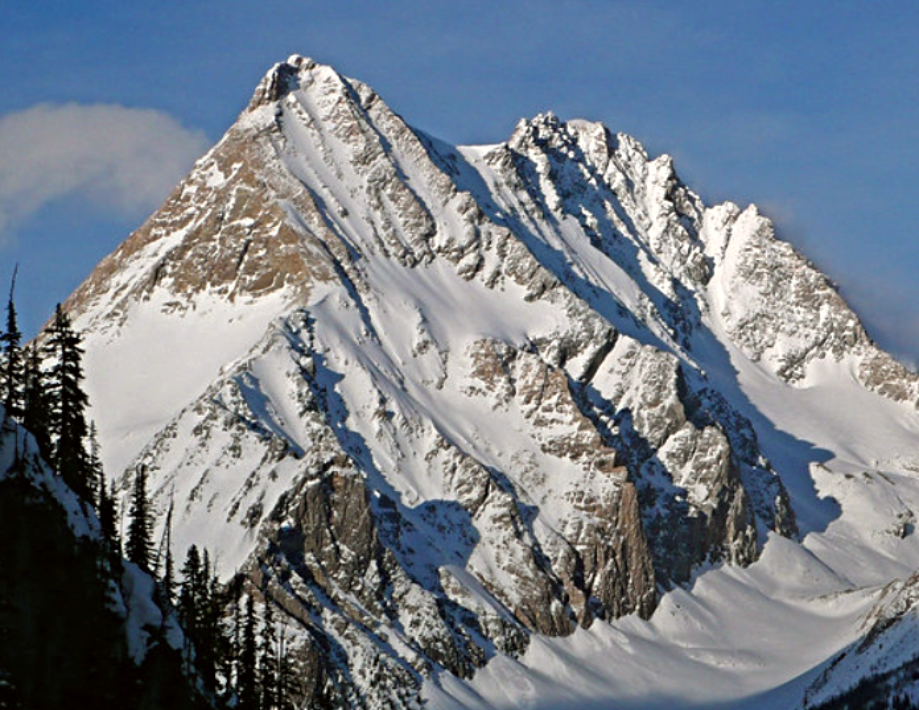
Karnak-Jumbo in winter

== See also ==
- Geography of British Columbia
