= Mount Macduff =

Mountain in British Columbia, Canada

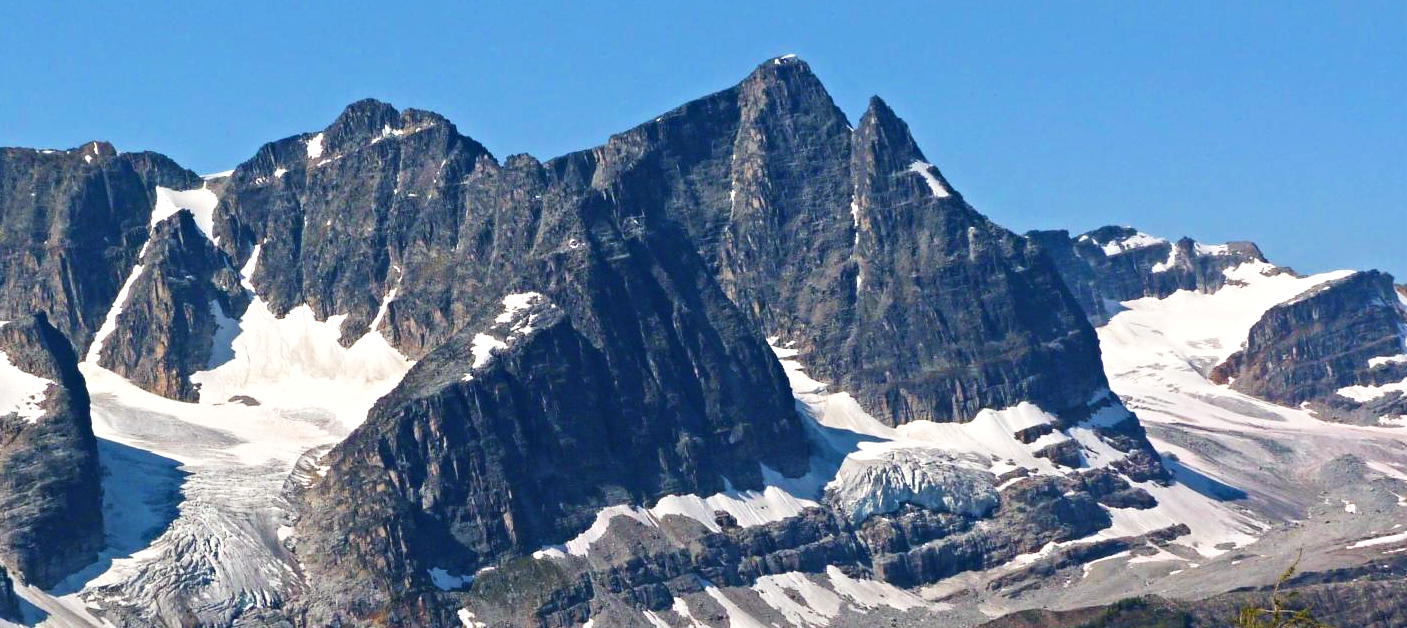
- Mount Macduff, east aspect

Highest point
- Elevation: 3,009 m (9,872 ft)
- Prominence: 249 m (817 ft)
- Parent peak: Mount Macbeth (3059 m)
- Listing: Mountains of British Columbia
- Coordinates: 50°25′55″N 116°47′01″W

Geography
- Location within British Columbia Location within Canada
- Location: British Columbia, Canada
- District: Kootenay Land District
- Parent range: MacBeth Group ← Purcell Mountains
- Topo map: NTS 82K7 Duncan Lake

Climbing
- First ascent: 1960 A. Maki, R.C. West
- Easiest route: class 2 SW slope, glacier travel

Mount Macduff is a 3,009-metre (9,872-foot) mountain summit located in the Macbeth Group of the Purcell Mountains in southeast British Columbia, Canada. It is situated 60 km (37 mi) north of Kaslo, and its nearest higher peak is Mount Macbeth, 4.7 km (2.9 mi) to the south. The first ascent of the mountain was made in 1960 by A. Maki and Robert C. West via the southwest slope. The peak was named for Lord Macduff, a character in William Shakespeare's Macbeth. The name follows the Macbeth-theme of features surrounding the Macbeth Icefield, such as Mount Lady Macbeth, Mount Fleance, and Mount Banquo. The mountain's name was officially adopted July 17, 1962, when approved by the Geographical Names Board of Canada.

== Climate ==
Based on the Köppen climate classification, Mount Macduff is located in a subarctic climate zone with cold, snowy winters, and mild summers. Temperatures can drop below −20 °C with wind chill factors below −30 °C. Precipitation runoff from Mount Macduff and meltwater from its surrounding glaciers drains into tributaries of the Duncan River.

== See also ==
- Geography of British Columbia
