= West Buttress (South Howser Tower) =

Alpine climbing route in British Columbia, Canada

West Buttress of South Howser Tower
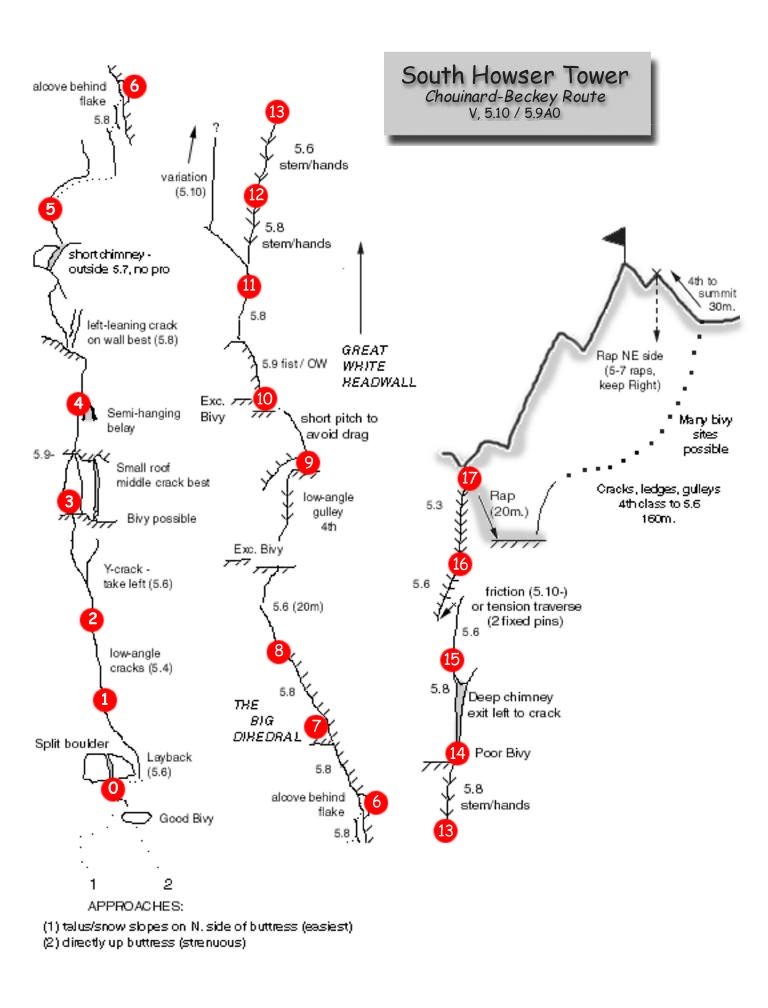
- Topo digram of the route.
- Location: Selkirk Range, British Columbia, Canada
- Range: Purcell Mountains, East Kootenay
- Climbing area: Bugaboos
- Route type: Traditional climbing, Alpine climbing
- Vertical gain: 750-metre (2,460 ft)
- Pitches: 17 to 22
- Technical grade: 5.8 (5b) & A2 (aided) / 5.10 (1) (free)
- NCCS grade: V
- First ascent: Fred Beckey & Yvon Chouinard (August 1961)

The West Buttress of South Howser Tower is a circa 17 pitch 750-metre (2,460 ft) alpine-climbing traditional-climbing route, in The Bugaboos range of the Purcell Mountains of British Columbia in Canada. The route is considered to be one the finest alpine climbing routes in North America, and akin to a big wall climbing rock climbing route.

== Access ==
Although the climb almost entirely on granite rock, glacier travel is necessary to access it and descend via the normal rappels on the north face. Access is typically from the Conrad Kain Hut, requiring several hours of glacier travel, and includes steep slopes on snow or ice. A fast party can climb the route in a day, but quite typically the large sandy ledges about halfway up are utilized for a bivouac. Above the ledges rises the Great White Headwall, which provides the crux of the route. The route is typified by crack and dihedral climbing, and has good tradition climbing protection for nuts and cams; there are no bolted anchors. The route is included in the historic climbing book Fifty Classic Climbs of North America.

== History ==
After the first climb by Fred Beckey and Yvon Chouinard in August 1961, the route saw little traffic, since climbers of the era preferred to establish new routes to repeating the known ones. This started to change in the late 1960s as the ascents began using less aids. The now-eponymous Beckey/Chouinard route, however, remained in the aid climbing domain for 14 years, as its 5.10 difficulty surpassed the 5.9 free climbing maximum of the time. After the late 1970s, the renown of both the Beckey/Chouinard and The Bugaboos grew, transforming the area into an international summer climbing destination.

=== Notable Ascents ===
- July 1970 (Second ascent): Completed by R. Breeze and J. Home.
- 1975 (First free ascent): Achieved by Yosemite climbers Tobin Sorenson and Rick Accomazo, who managed to overcome the route's 5.10 crux.

== Gallery ==
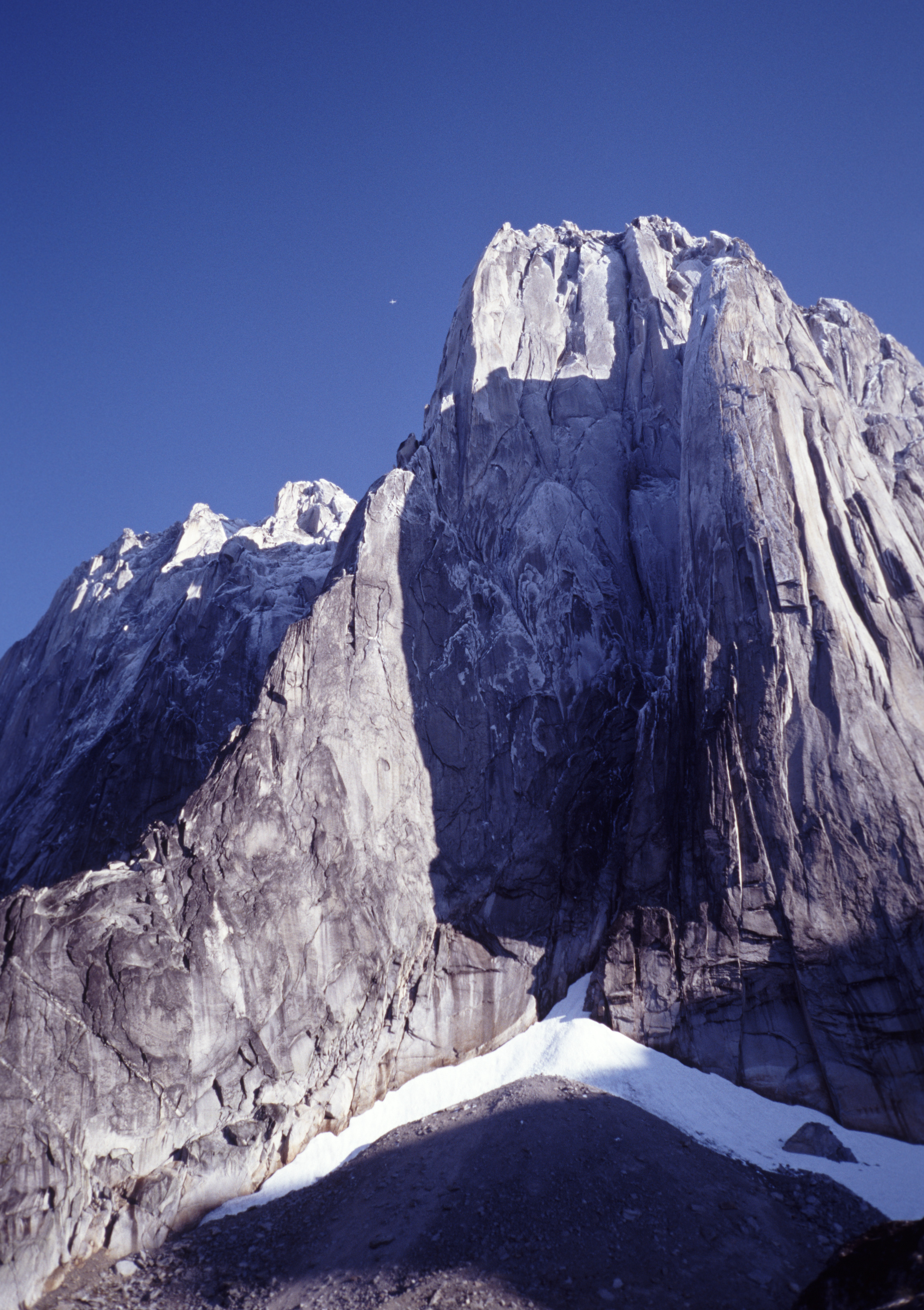
The West Buttress rises from the left

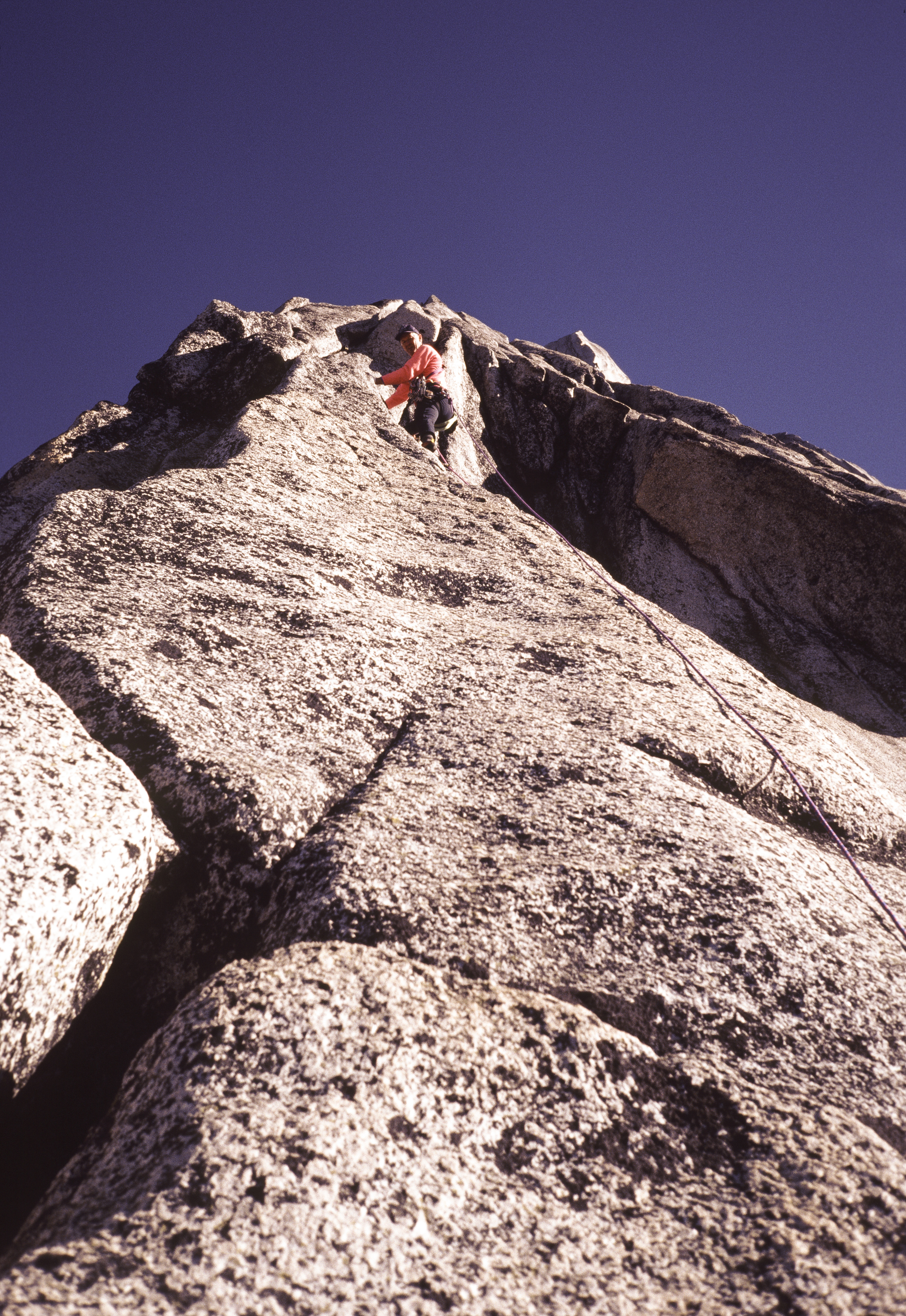
An early pitch on the lower part of the buttress

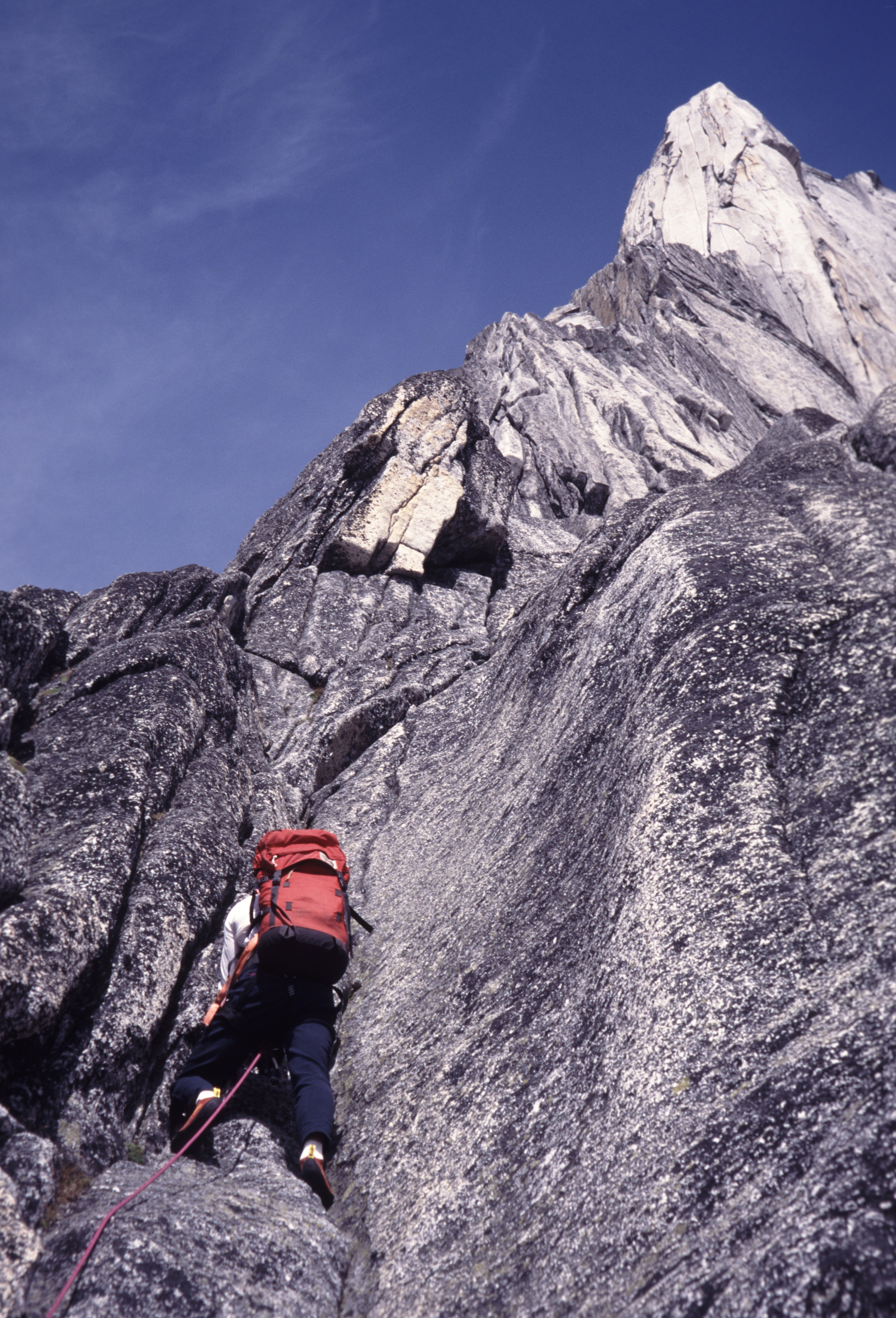
A climber leading one of the early moderate pitches

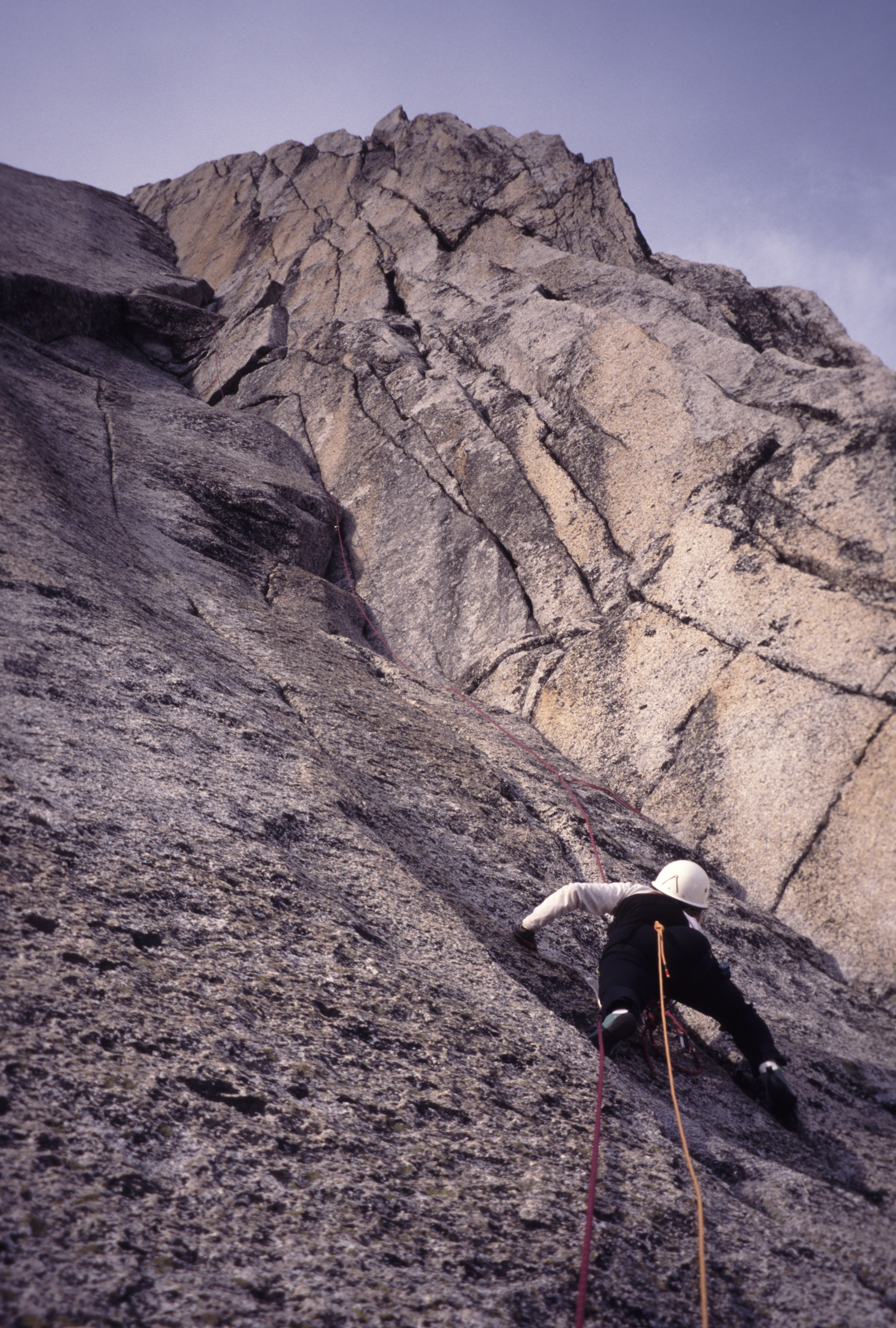
Leading towards the classic dihedral pitches, lower part of the route

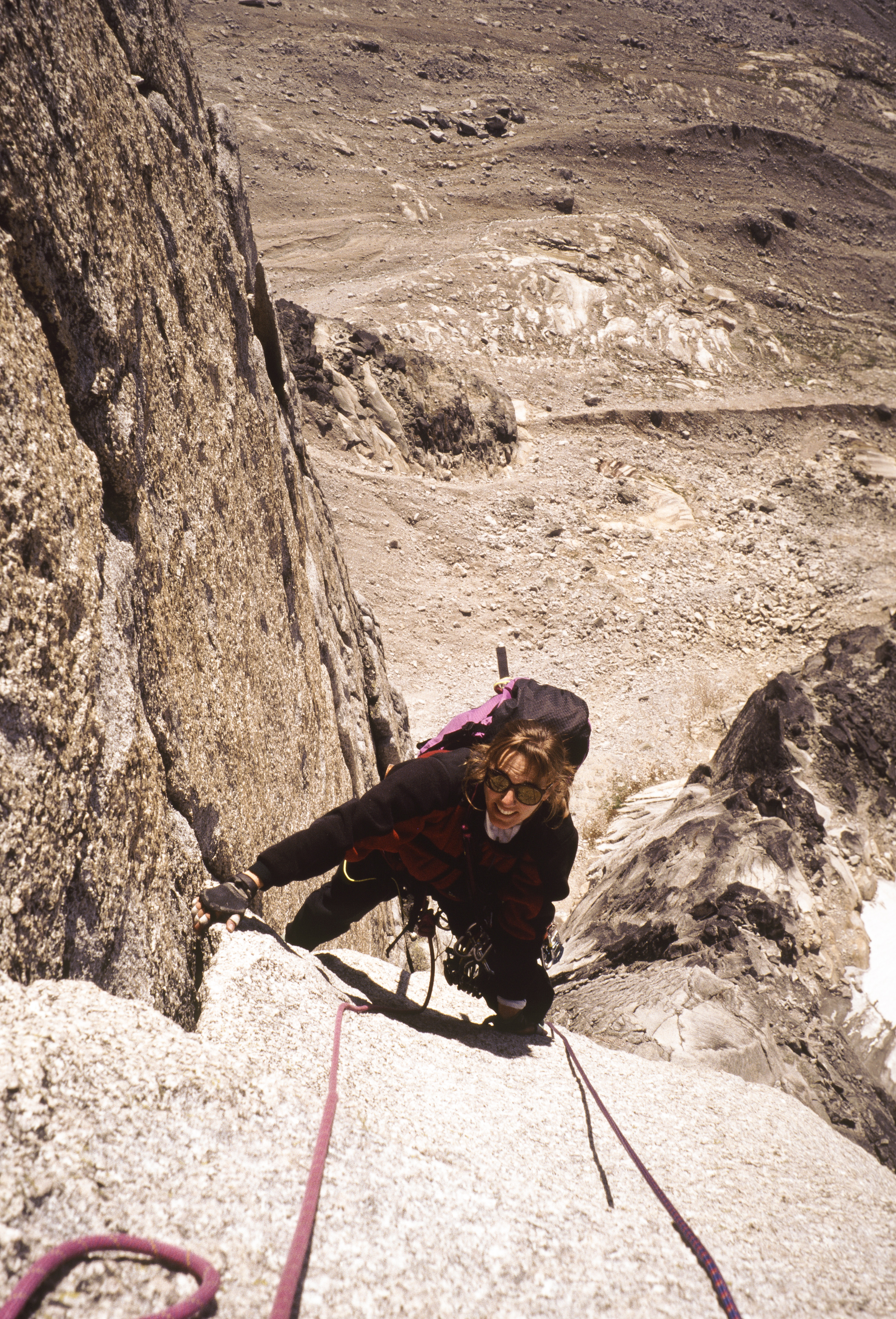
The great dihedral around pitch 8

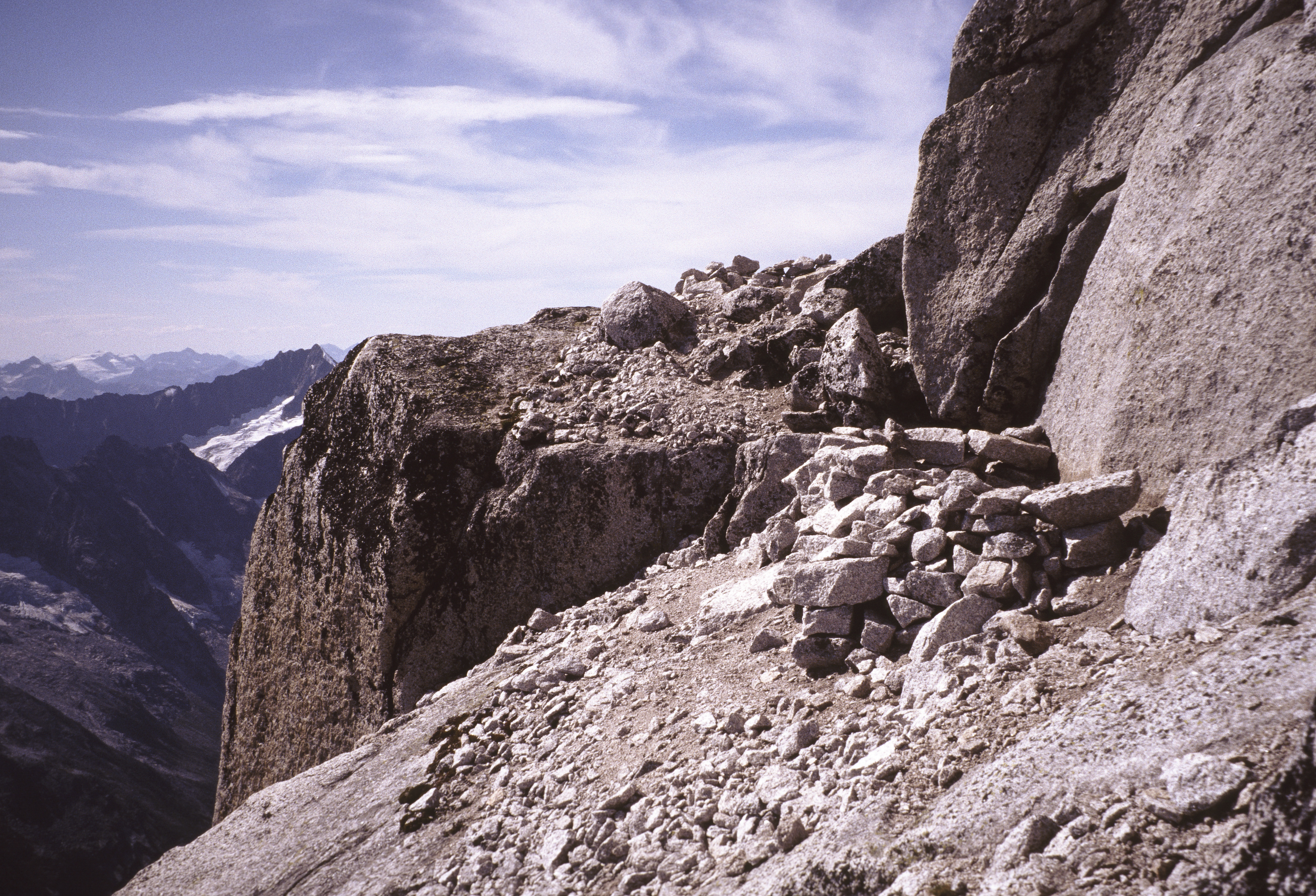
The large sandy ledges about halfway up, a good bivouac site

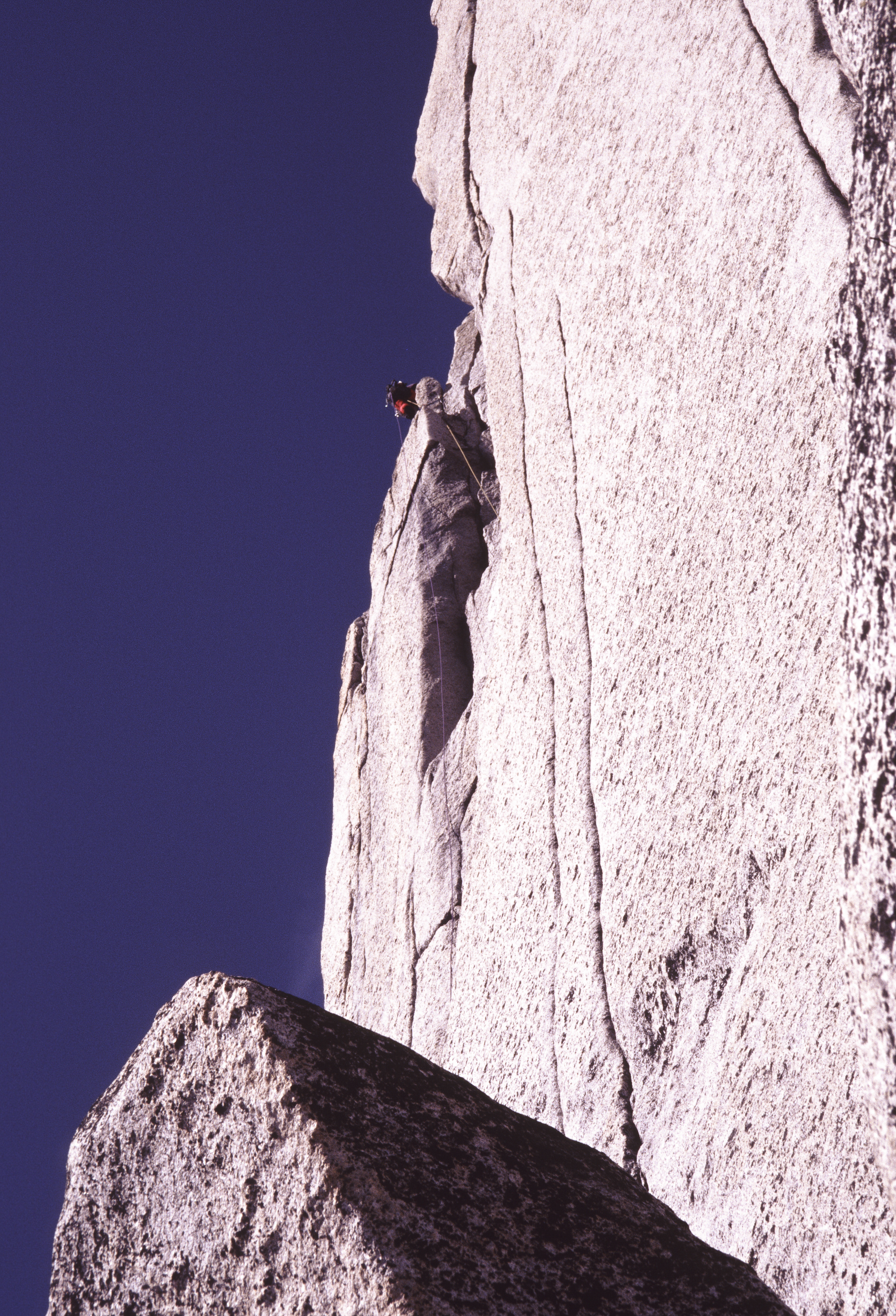
The Great White Headwall above the sandy ledges, the crux of the route.

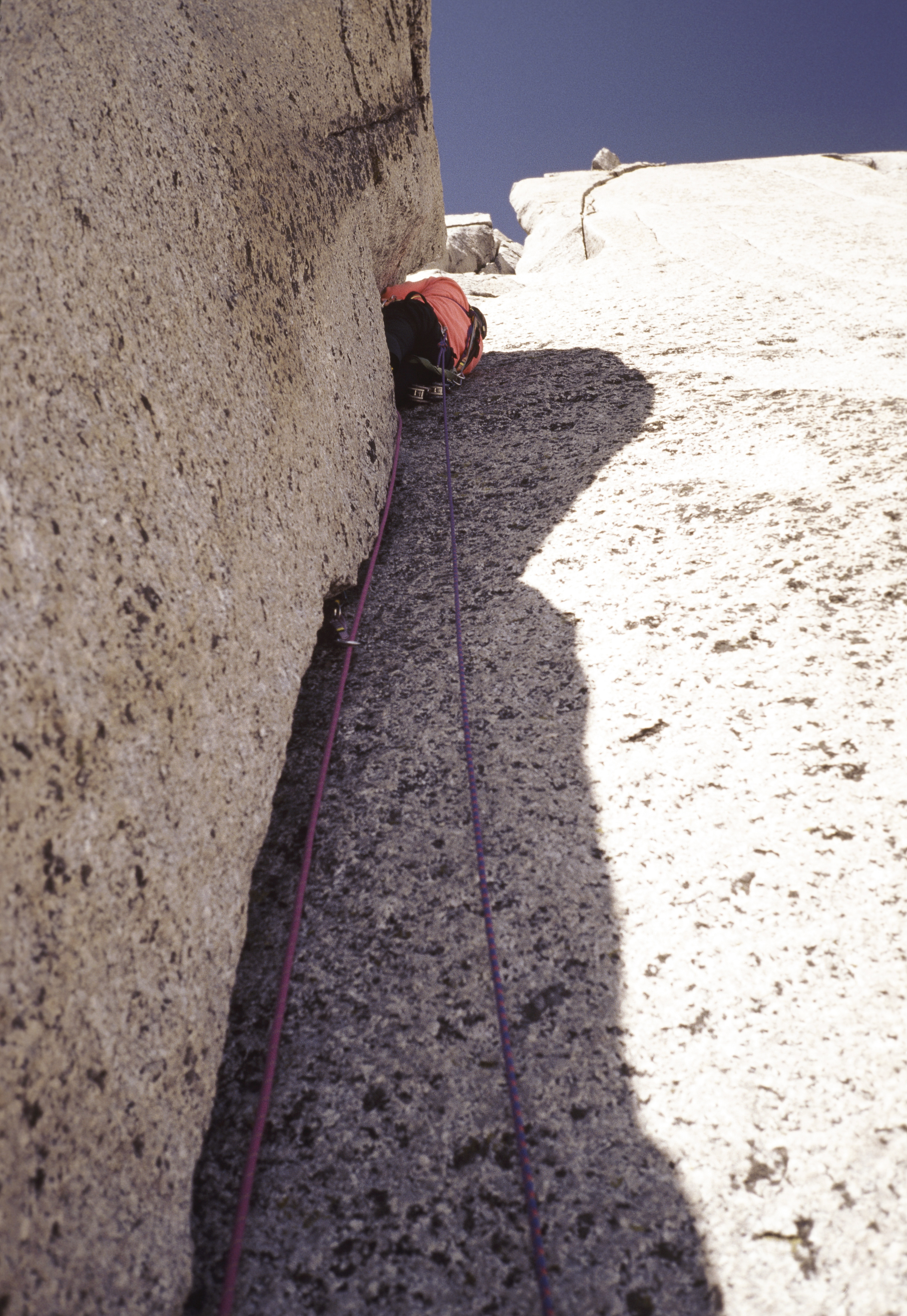
A dihedral on the Great White Headwall is the easiest way up.

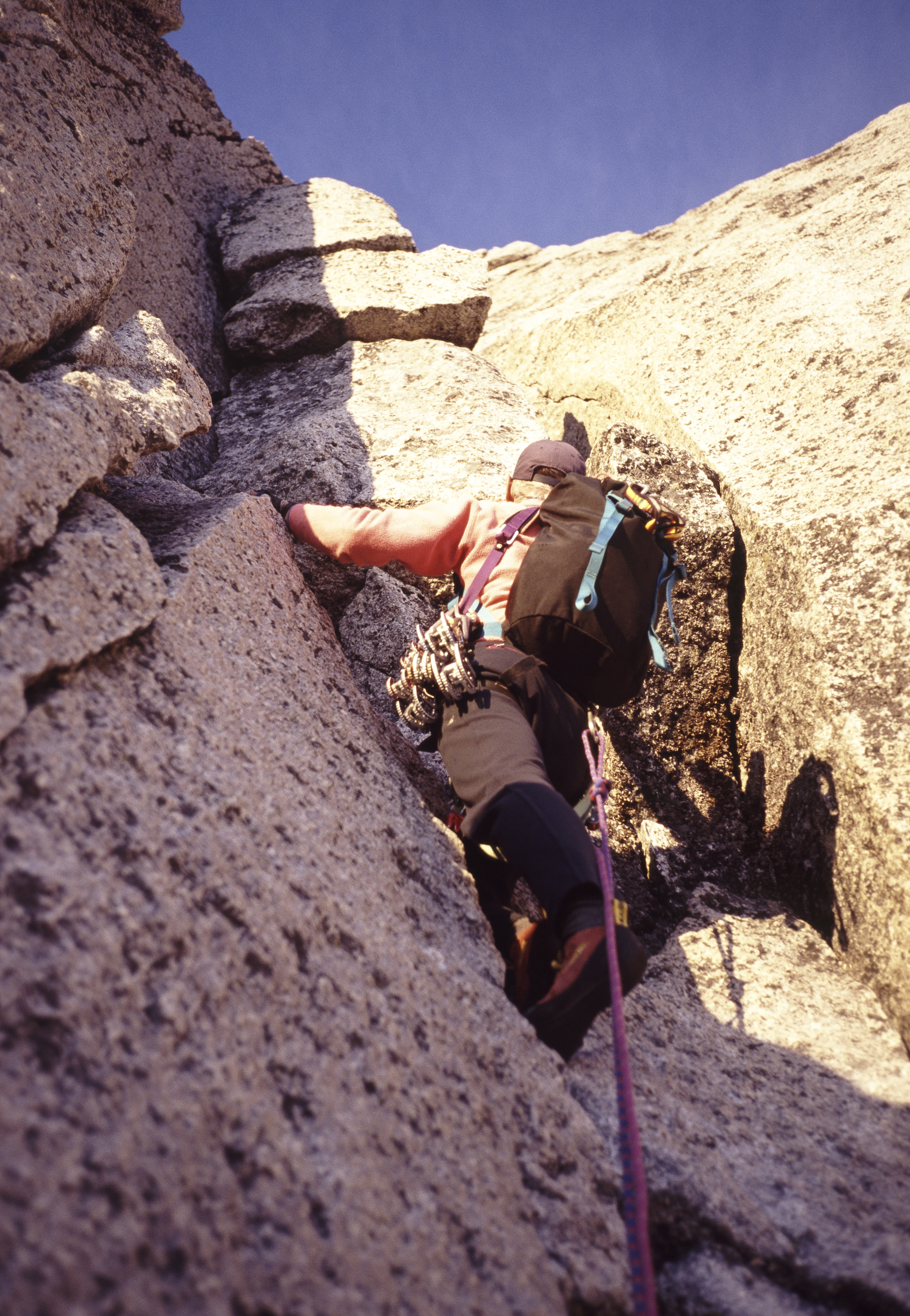
The upper dihedrals, around pitch 12.

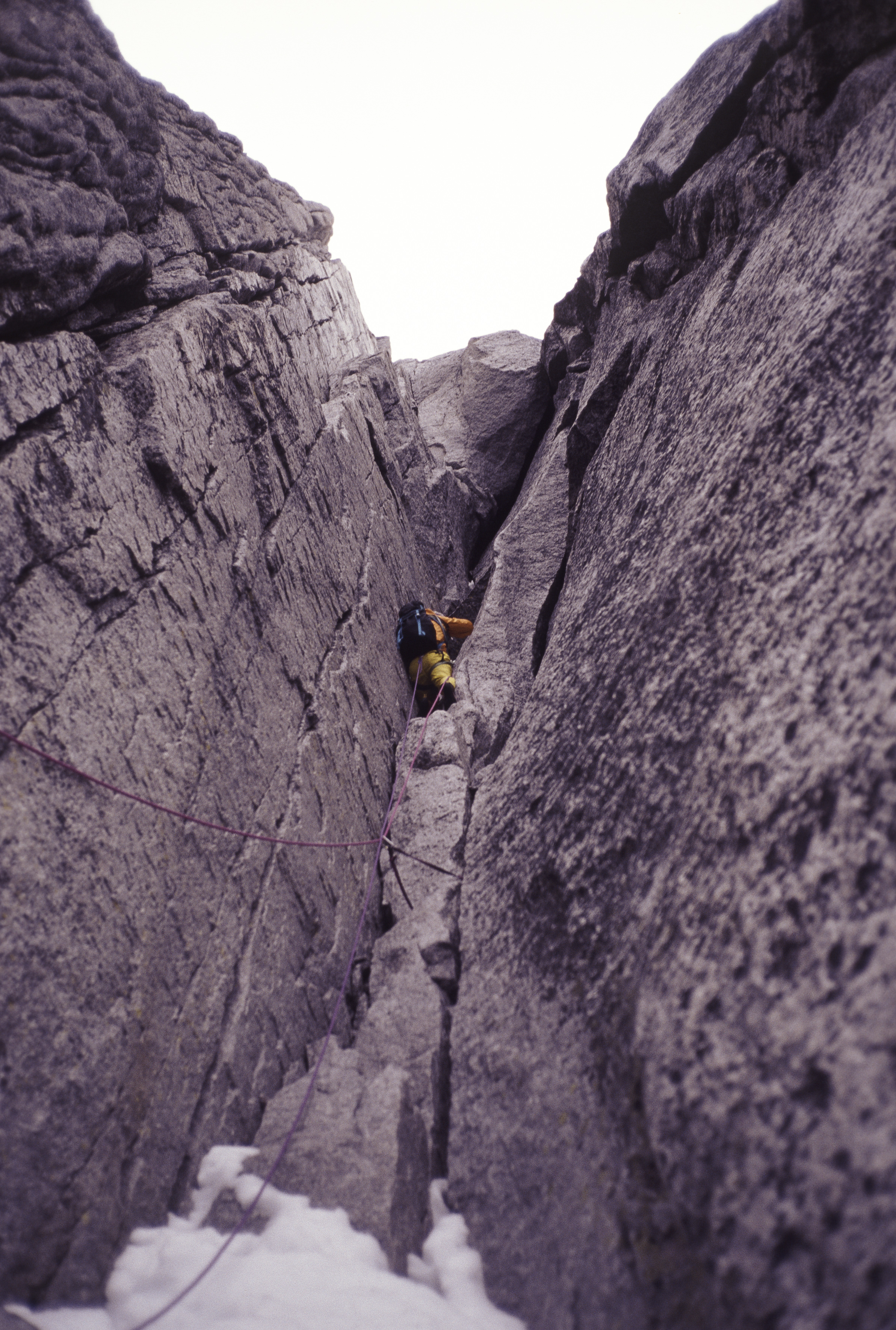
A large chimney high on the route, around pitch 15

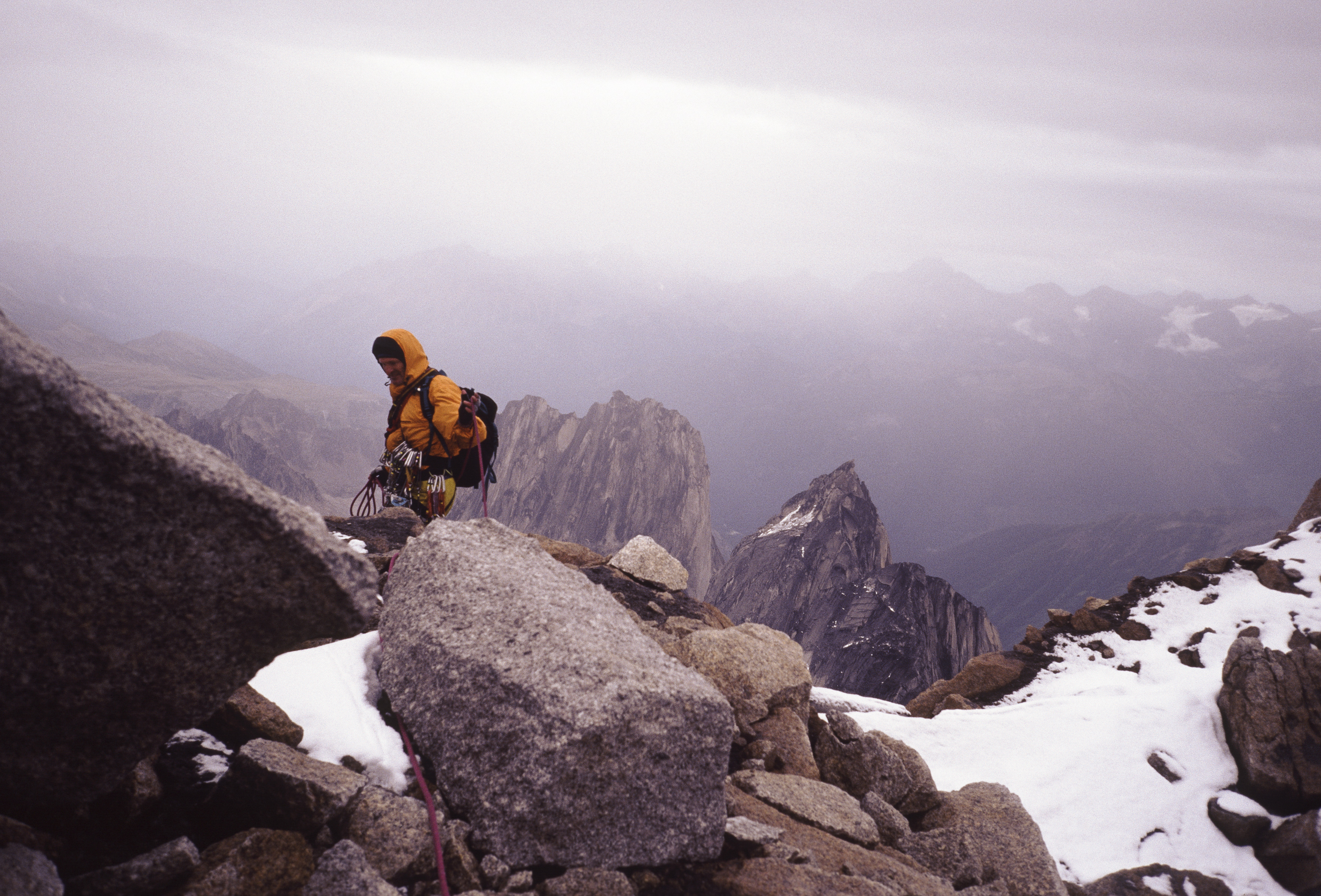
Top of the route, the summit is a short scramble left.

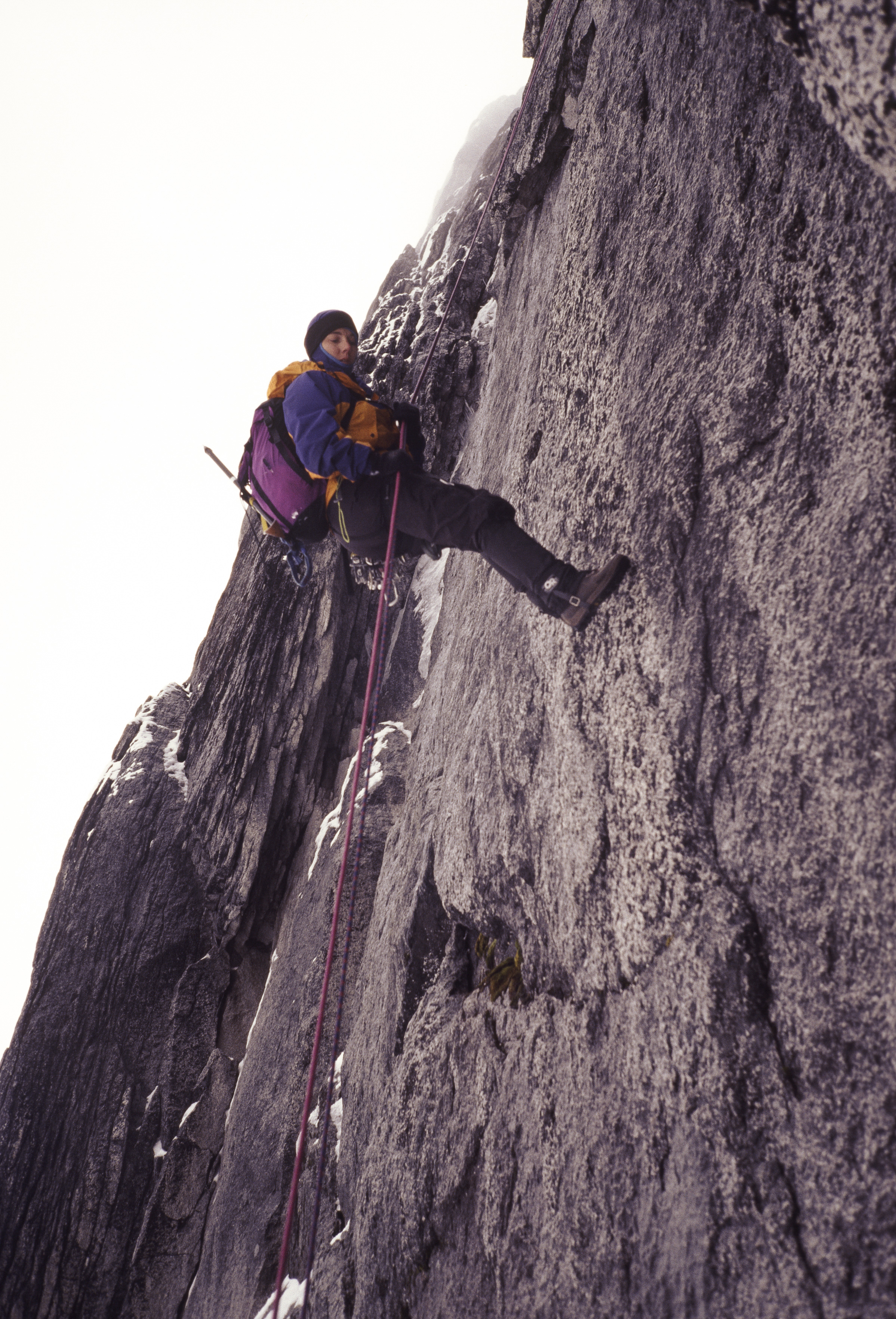
Rappelling the NE Face headwall.

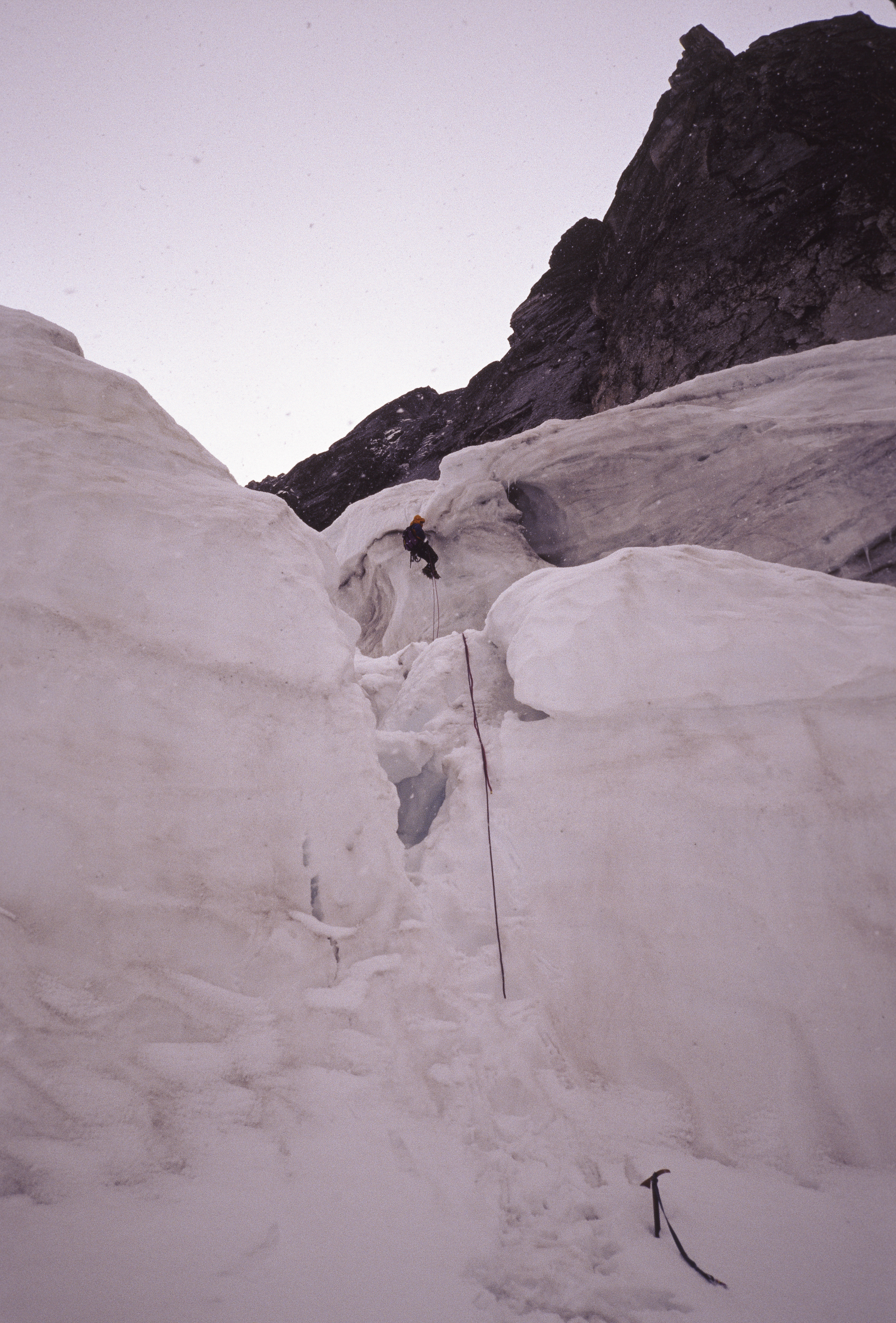
The lower rappel over the bergschrund

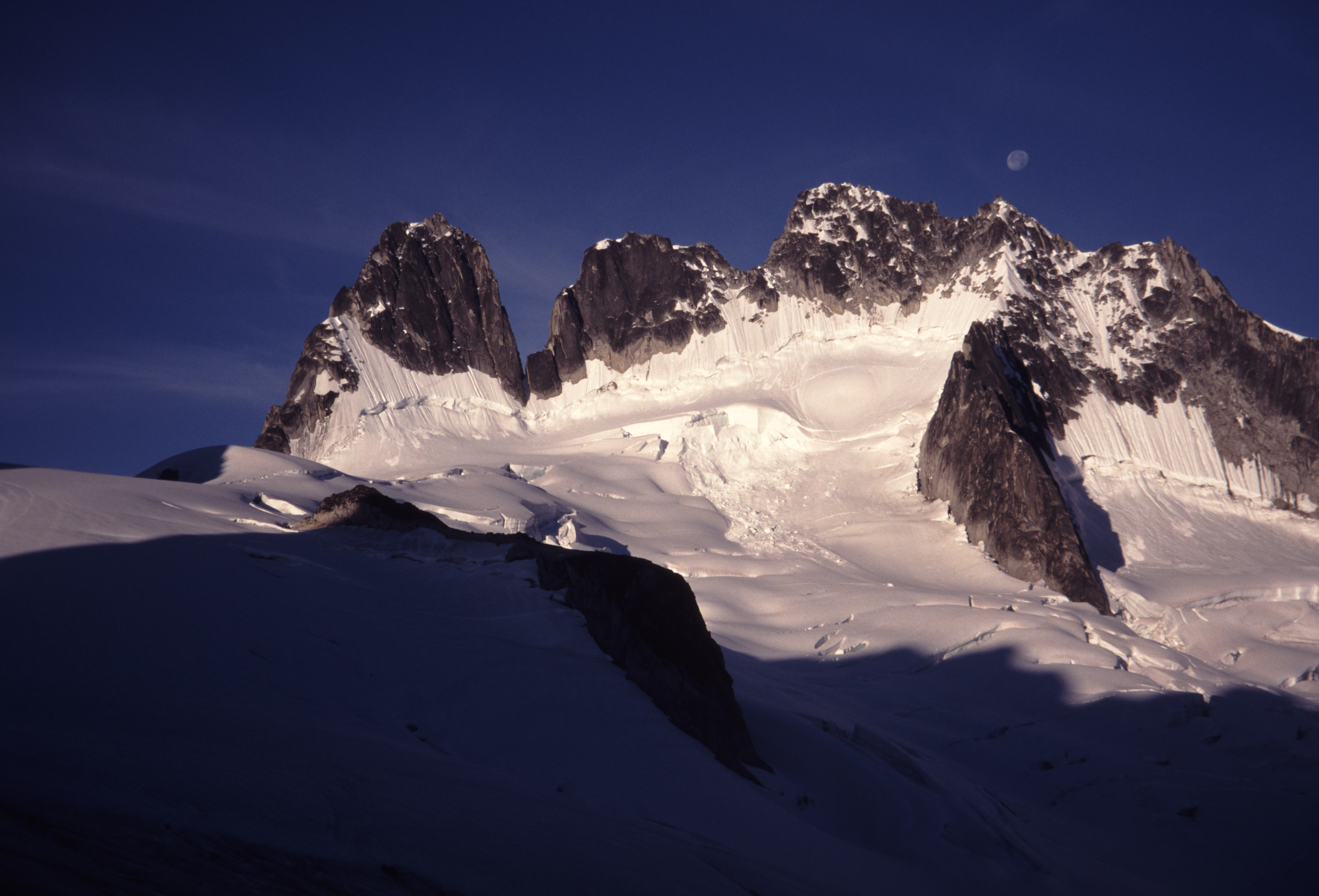
The NE Face (S. Howser Tower on the left)

== See also ==
- Bugaboo Provincial Park
- The Bugaboos
- Mountain peaks of North America
