= Brenta Spire =

Mountain in British Columbia, Canada

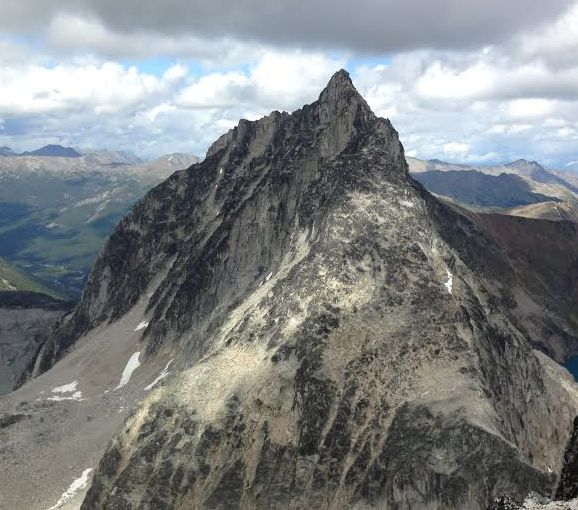
- Brenta Spire

Highest point
- Elevation: 2,958 m (9,705 ft)
- Prominence: 313 m (1,027 ft)
- Coordinates: 50°45′36″N 116°46′20″W

Geography
- Location within British Columbia
- Interactive map of Brenta Spire
- Location: British Columbia, Canada
- District: Kootenay Land District
- Parent range: Purcell Mountains, Columbia Mountains
- Topo map: NTS 82K10 Howser Creek

Geology
- Mountain type: Granite

Climbing
- First ascent: 1938 M. Schnellbacher; L. Coveney; S. Hendricks; P. Olton; P. Prescott

Brenta Spire is a peak in the Purcell Mountains of the Columbia Mountains in southeastern British Columbia, Canada. Brenta Spire is the highest and middle of the three granite spires on a cirque west of Cobalt Lake.

== Routes ==
The most common route is the south ridge, which can be climbed on its own or as part of the popular Brenta Spire - Northpost Spire traverse.
