= Truce Mountain =

Mountain in British Columbia, Canada

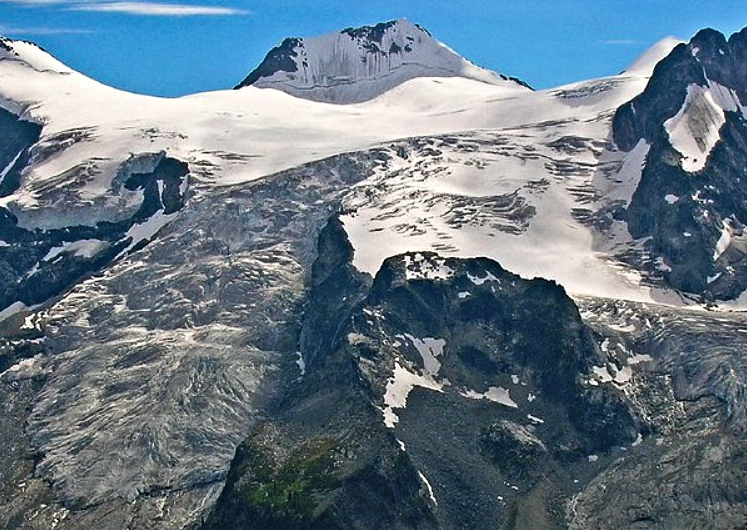
- Truce Mountain, northeast aspect with Cauldron Glacier

Highest point
- Elevation: 3,262 m (10,702 ft)
- Prominence: 977 m (3,205 ft)
- Parent peak: Mount Hamill (3274 m)
- Listing: Mountains of British Columbia
- Coordinates: 50°18′23″N 116°41′16″W

Geography
- Location within British Columbia Location within Canada
- Location: British Columbia, Canada
- District: Kootenay Land District
- Parent range: Purcell Mountains
- Topo map: NTS 82K7 Duncan Lake

Climbing
- First ascent: 1916

Truce Mountain is a 3,262-metre (10,702-foot) glaciated mountain summit located in the Purcell Mountains of British Columbia, Canada. It is situated 46 km (29 mi) north of Kaslo, on the northern boundary of Purcell Wilderness Conservancy Provincial Park and Protected Area. The nearest higher peak is Mount Hamill, 11 km (6.8 mi) to the southeast. Other nearby peaks include Mount Macbeth, 11 km (6.8 mi) to the northwest, and Archduke Mountain, 6 km (3.7 mi) to the west. The first ascent of Truce Mountain was made August 9, 1916, by Conrad Kain, H. Otto Frind, Elise Hopkins, Albert H. MacCarthy, Elizabeth MacCarthy, Margaret Stone, Winthrop E. Stone, Mrs. George E. Vincent, and John Vincent. The mountain's name was officially adopted June 9, 1960, when approved by the Geographical Names Board of Canada.

== Climate ==
Based on the Köppen climate classification, Truce Mountain is located in a subarctic climate zone with cold, snowy winters, and mild summers. Temperatures can drop below −20 °C with wind chill factors below −30 °C. Precipitation runoff from the mountain and meltwater from its surrounding glaciers drains into tributaries of the Duncan River.

== See also ==
- Geography of British Columbia
