= Jumbo Mountain (Canada) =

Mountain in British Columbia, Canada

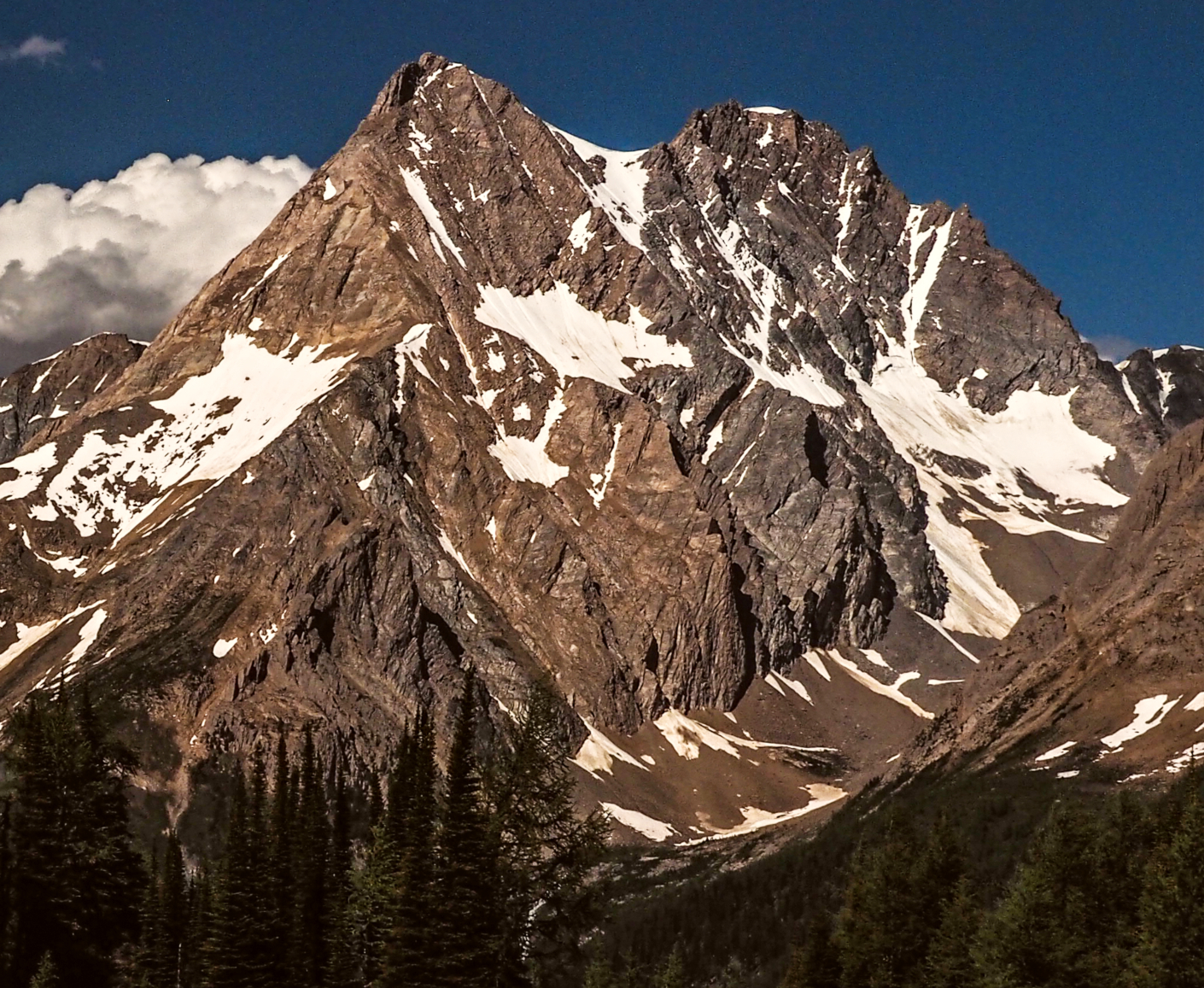
- Karnak-Jumbo Massif, southwest aspect. Karnak (left), Jumbo (right)

Highest point
- Elevation: 3,437 m (11,276 ft)
- Prominence: 752 m (2,467 ft)
- Parent peak: Jumbo Mountain (3437 m)
- Listing: Mountains of British Columbia
- Coordinates: 50°24′11″N 116°33′54″W

Geography
- Location within British Columbia Location within Canada
- Interactive map of Jumbo Mountain
- Location: British Columbia, Canada
- District: Kootenay Land District
- Parent range: Purcell Mountains; Columbia Mountains
- Topo map: NTS 82K7 Duncan Lake

Climbing
- First ascent: 1915

Jumbo Mountain, sometimes called Mount Jumbo, is a 3,437-metre-elevation (11,276-foot) mountain summit located 42 km (26 mi) west-southwest of Invermere in the Purcell Mountains of southeast British Columbia, Canada. The nearest higher peak is Mount Farnham, 11 km (6.8 mi) to the north-northeast, and Karnak Mountain is set 0.79 km (0.49 mi) to the west. Jumbo and Karnak form a double summit massif which is the second-highest mountain in the Purcells, and fourth-highest in the Columbia Mountains. The first ascent of Jumbo Mountain was made August 4, 1915, by H.O. Frind, A.H. & E.L. MacCarthy, M & W.E. Stone, B. Shultz, and Conrad Kain via the North/Northeast Slopes. March 5, 1919, Conrad made a solo ascent of Jumbo Mtn on snowshoes - credited as the first winter ascent of an 11,000-ft peak in Canada. The peak was named by Edward Warren Harnden after the 1892 Jumbo Mineral Claim on nearby Toby Creek, which in turn was named for Jumbo the elephant. The mountain's toponym was officially adopted March 31, 1924, when approved by the Geographical Names Board of Canada.

== Climate ==
Based on the Köppen climate classification, Jumbo Mountain is located in a subarctic climate zone with cold, snowy winters, and mild summers. Winter temperatures can drop below −20 °C with wind chill factors below −30 °C. Precipitation runoff from the mountain drains into south into Jumbo Creek which is a tributary of Toby Creek, and meltwater from the Jumbo Glacier on its north slope drains into Horsethief Creek which, like Toby Creek, is also a tributary of the Columbia River.

== Climbing Routes ==
Established climbing routes on Jumbo Mountain:

- North/Northeast slopes - First ascent 1915
- West Ridge - First ascent 1974

== Gallery ==
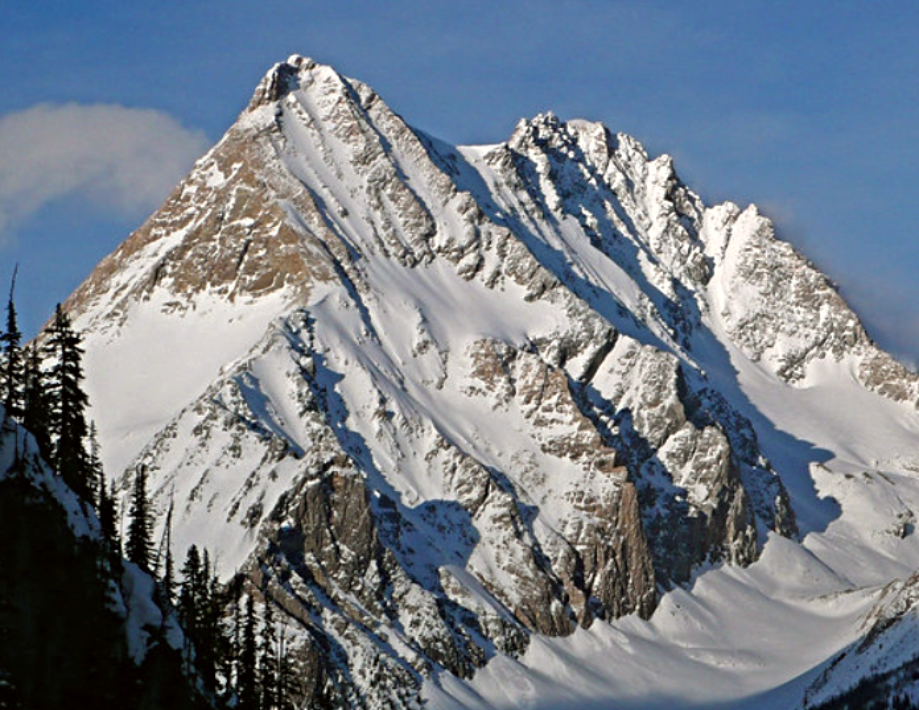
Karnak-Jumbo in winter

== See also ==
- Geography of British Columbia
