= Purcell Mountains =

Mountain range in British Columbia, Canada

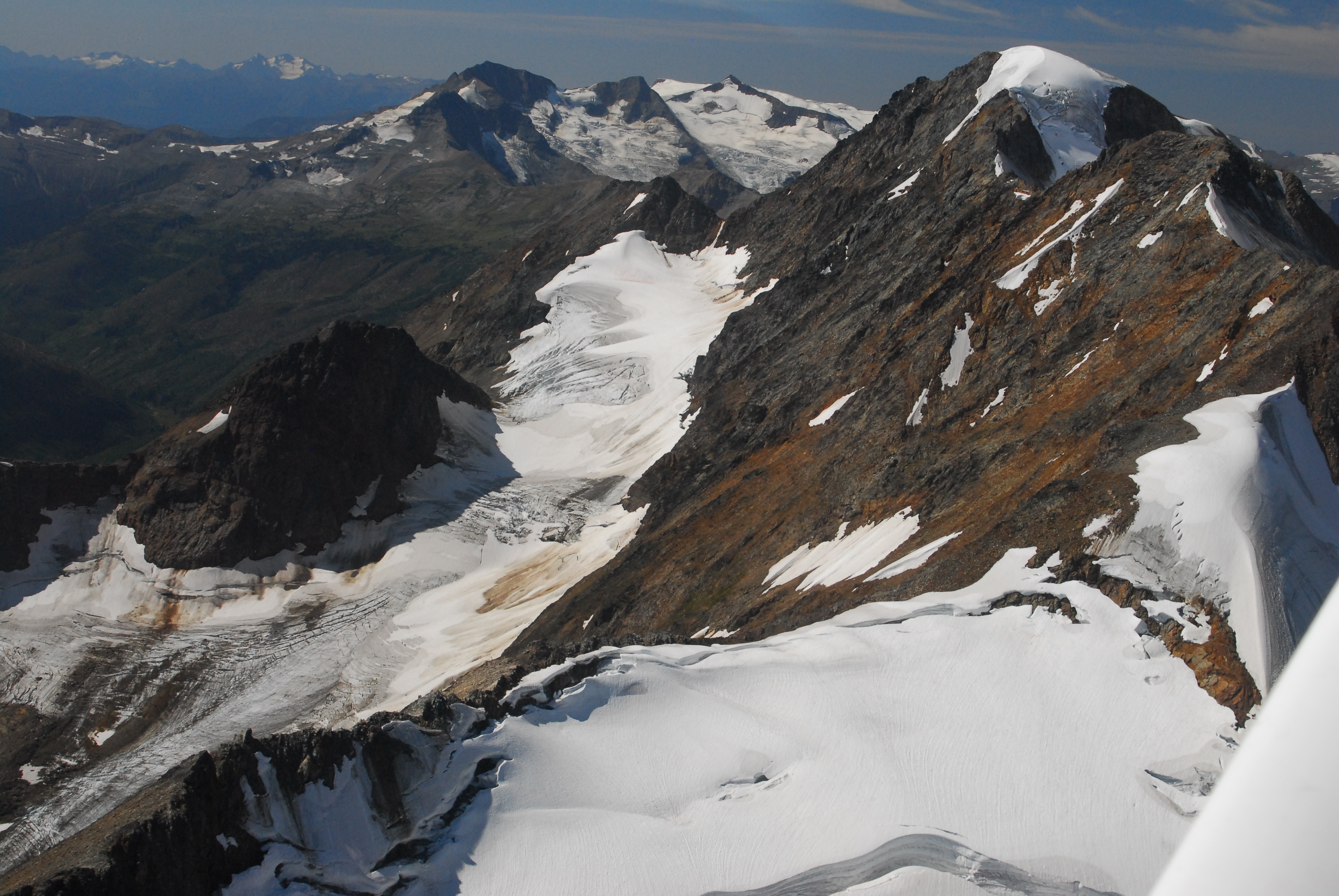

Highest point
- Peak: Mount Farnham, British Columbia
- Elevation: 3,493 m (11,460 ft)
- Prominence: 2,123 m (6,965 ft)
- Coordinates: 50°29′20″N 116°29′13″W

Geography
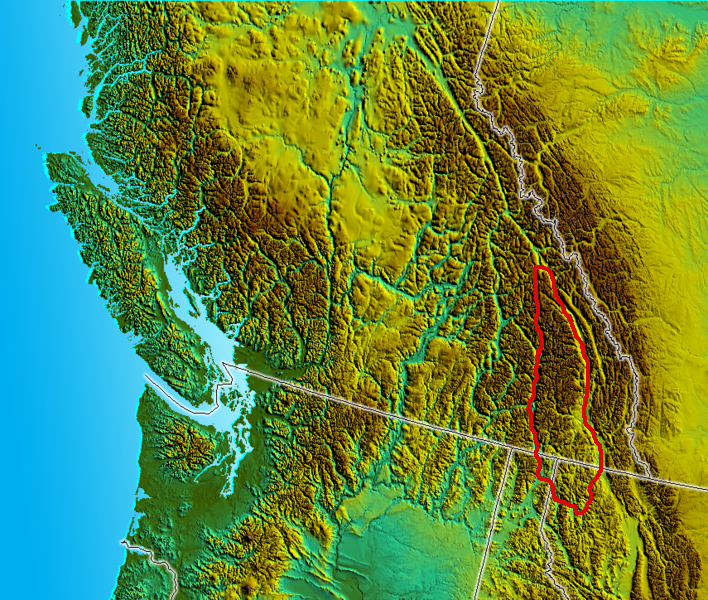
- Location map of the Purcell Mountains
- Countries: Canada; United States
- Provinces/States: British Columbia; Montana; Idaho
- Range coordinates: 49°55′N 116°15′W
- Parent range: Columbia Mountains

The Purcell Mountains are a mountain range in southeastern British Columbia, Canada. They are a subrange of the Columbia Mountains, which includes the Selkirk, Monashee, and Cariboo Mountains. They are located on the west side of the Rocky Mountain Trench in the area of the Columbia Valley, and on the east side of the valley of Kootenay Lake and the Duncan River. The only large settlements in the mountains are the Panorama Ski Resort and Kicking Horse Resort, adjacent to the Columbia Valley towns of Invermere and Golden, though there are small settlements, such as Yahk and Moyie along the Crowsnest Highway, and residential rural areas dependent on the cities of Creston, Kimberley and Cranbrook, which are located adjacent to the range.

The Purcells are shown on some United States maps as the Percell Mountains, where their southern limit protrudes into the states of Idaho and Montana, abutting Lake Koocanusa, a reservoir on the Kootenai River. American geographic classifications consider the Percells to be part of the Rocky Mountains, but in Canada that terminology is reserved for ranges on the east side of the Rocky Mountain Trench. In the Purcell Mountains, most of the peaks are near or above 10,000 feet in elevation.

The Purcell Supergroup rocks that make up the Purcells were formed in the Proterozoic eon (in the Precambrian period), which spans from 2,500 million years ago to about 540 million years ago.

== Sub-ranges ==
- Carbonate Range
- Dogtooth Range
- Farnham Group
- MacBeth Group
- McGillivary Range
- Moyie Range
- Septet Range
- Spillimacheen Range
- Starbird Ridge
- Stockdale Group
- Toby Glacier
- Truce Group
- Yahk Range

== Highest peaks ==
The ten highest summits of the Purcells:

1. Mount Farnham 3493 m
2. Jumbo Mountain 3437 m
3. Howser Spire 3412 m
4. Karnak Mountain 3411 m
5. Mount Delphine 3406 m
6. Mount Hammond 3387 m
7. Commander Mountain 3371 m
8. South Howser Tower 3364 m
9. Eyebrow Peak 3362 m
10. Mount Peter 3357 m

== See also ==
- The Bugaboos
- List of mountain ranges in Montana
