= Bugaboo =

Bugaboo, bug-a-boo or bug a boo may refer to:

- Bugaboo, a legendary scary creature, see bogeyman
- Bugaboo, a thin straight piton or metal spike, perfect for thin, deep seams
- Bugaboo International B.V., a Dutch design company that makes strollers for infants and toddlers
- Bugaboo, a fictional insectoid alien from children's CGI television series Monster Buster Club

In geography:

- Bugaboo Canyon, in the McGee Creek State Park area of Oklahoma, United States
- Bugaboo Swamp, a portion of the Okefenokee Swamp, located in the southern portion of Georgia, United States
  - Bugaboo Fire, a 2007 fire that was named for the above swamp
- The Bugaboos, a granite mountain range in the Purcell Mountains of eastern British Columbia, Canada
  - Bugaboo Provincial Park, a park in that area
  - Bugaboo Spire, a peak in The Bugaboos

In music

- BugAboo (group), a South Korean girl group formed in 2021
- "Bug a Boo" (song), a 1999 song by Destiny's Child
- "Bugaboo", a song by Dir En Grey from the album Uroboros, 2008

In other media

- Bug-a-Booo, a comic strip by Mauricio de Sousa about a gang of ghosts, undeads, and other Halloween creatures
- "Bug a Boo", an episode of the American television series Charmed
- Bugaboo (The Flea), a 1983 video game

== See also ==
- Boogaloo
- Bugbear
