= Snowpatch Spire =

Mountain in British Columbia, Canada

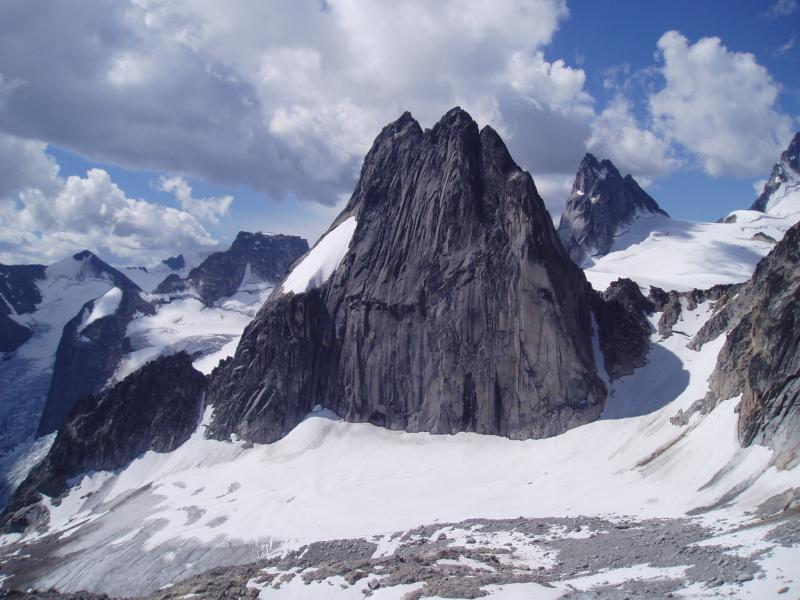
- Snowpatch Spire, with Pigeon Spire in the background on the right, Hound's Tooth and Marmolata Spire on the left.

Highest point
- Elevation: 3,084 m (10,118 ft)
- Prominence: 284 m (932 ft)
- Parent peak: Howser Spire (3,412 m)
- Coordinates: 50°44′11″N 116°46′56″W

Geography
- Location within British Columbia
- Interactive map of Snowpatch Spire
- Country: Canada
- Province: British Columbia
- District: Kootenay Land District
- Protected area: Bugaboo Provincial Park
- Parent range: Purcell Mountains; The Bugaboos
- Topo map: NTS 82K10 Howser Creek

Geology
- Rock age: 135 Million years ago
- Rock type: Granodiorite

Climbing
- First ascent: August 1940 by Raffi Bedayan and Jack Arnold
- Easiest route: class 5.8

Snowpatch Spire is a mountain peak in British Columbia, Canada. With its first ascent in 1940, it was the last of the Bugaboo Spires to be climbed. It is located southwest of the Conrad Kain hut, between Bugaboo, Vowell and Crescent Glaciers, at the south end of Bugaboo Provincial Park. The mountain's toponym was officially adopted October 29, 1962, by the Geographical Names Board of Canada.

== Climate ==
Based on the Köppen climate classification, Snowpatch Spire is located in a subarctic climate zone with cold, snowy winters, and mild summers. Winter temperatures can drop below −20 °C with wind chill factors below −30 °C.

== Routes ==
Climbing routes on Snowpatch Spire:

- Wildflowers – class 5.9
- Kraus-McCarthy – class 5.9
- Sunshine – class 5.11
- Surf's Up (aka Southwest Ridge) – class 5.9
- Southeast Corner (aka Snowpatch Route) – class 5.8

== Gallery ==
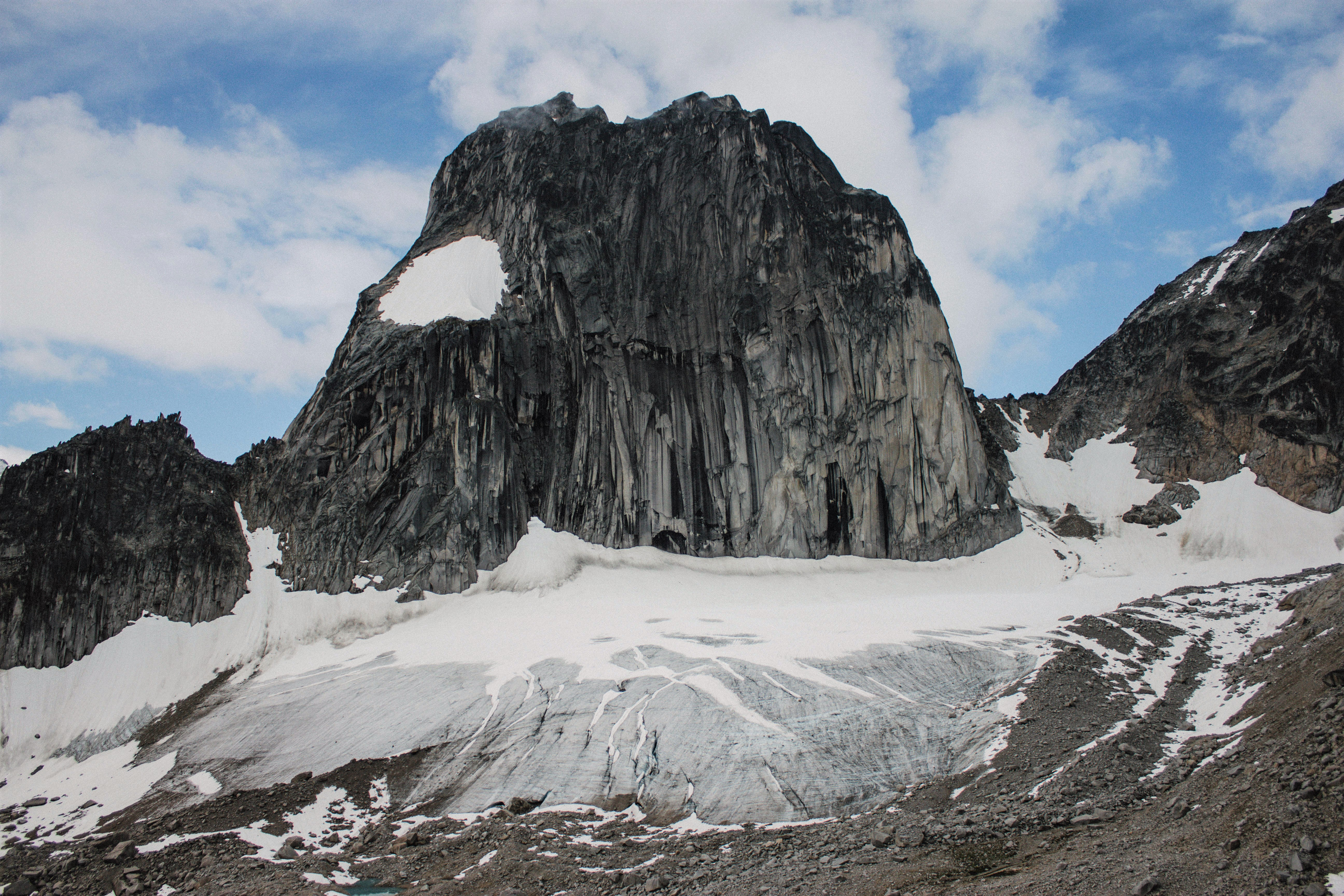
Northeast aspect

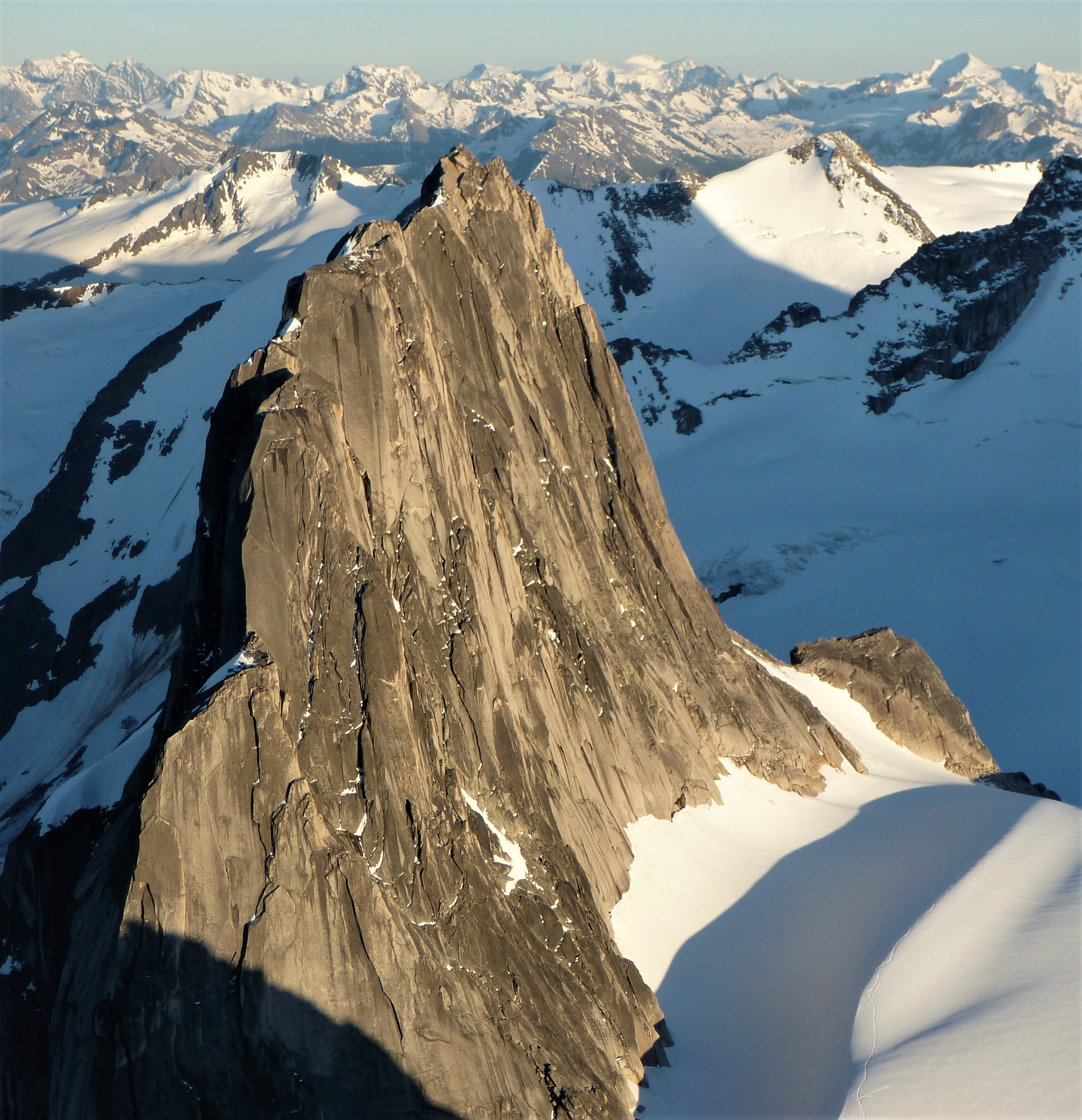
Snowpatch Spire seen from Bugaboo Spire

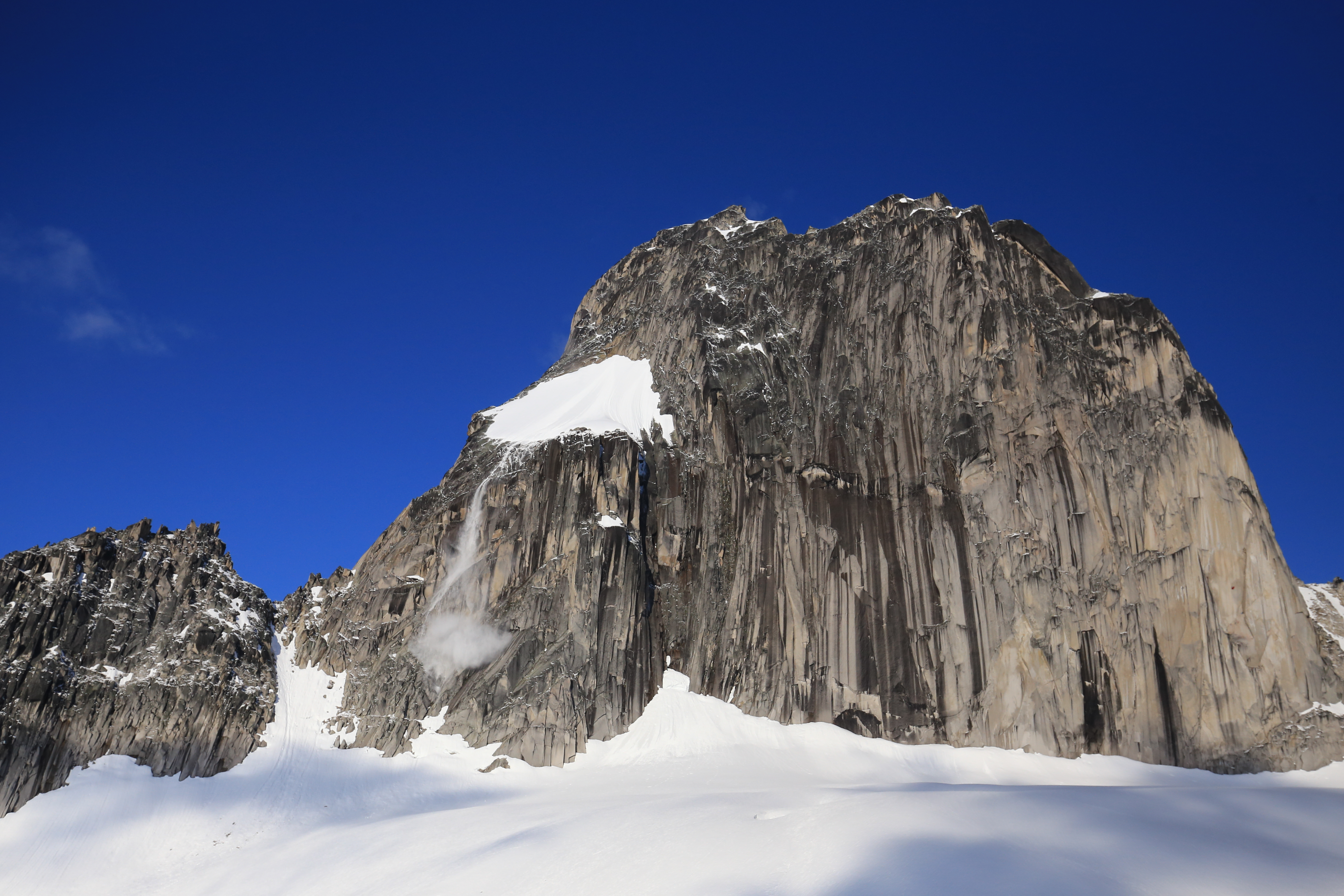

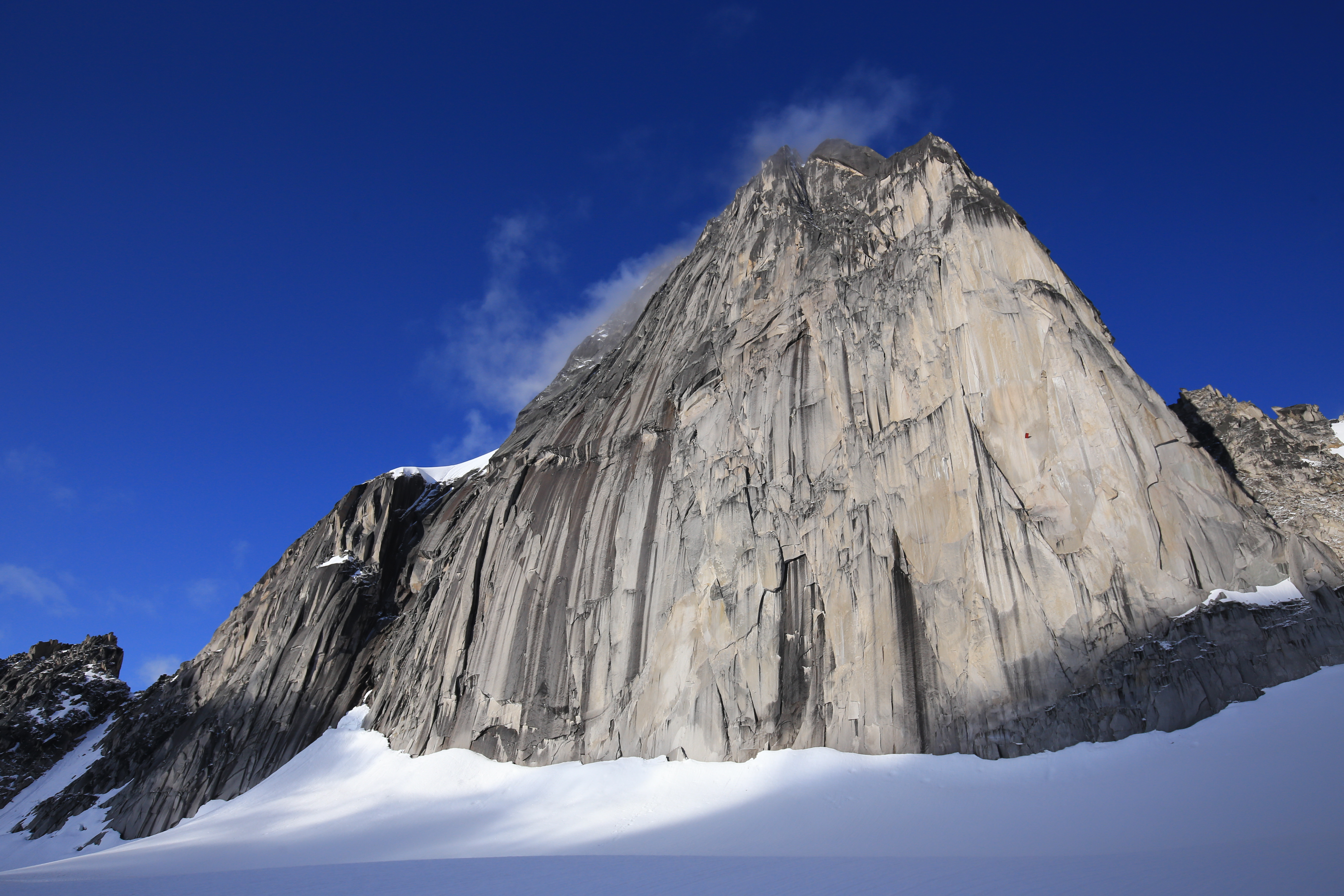

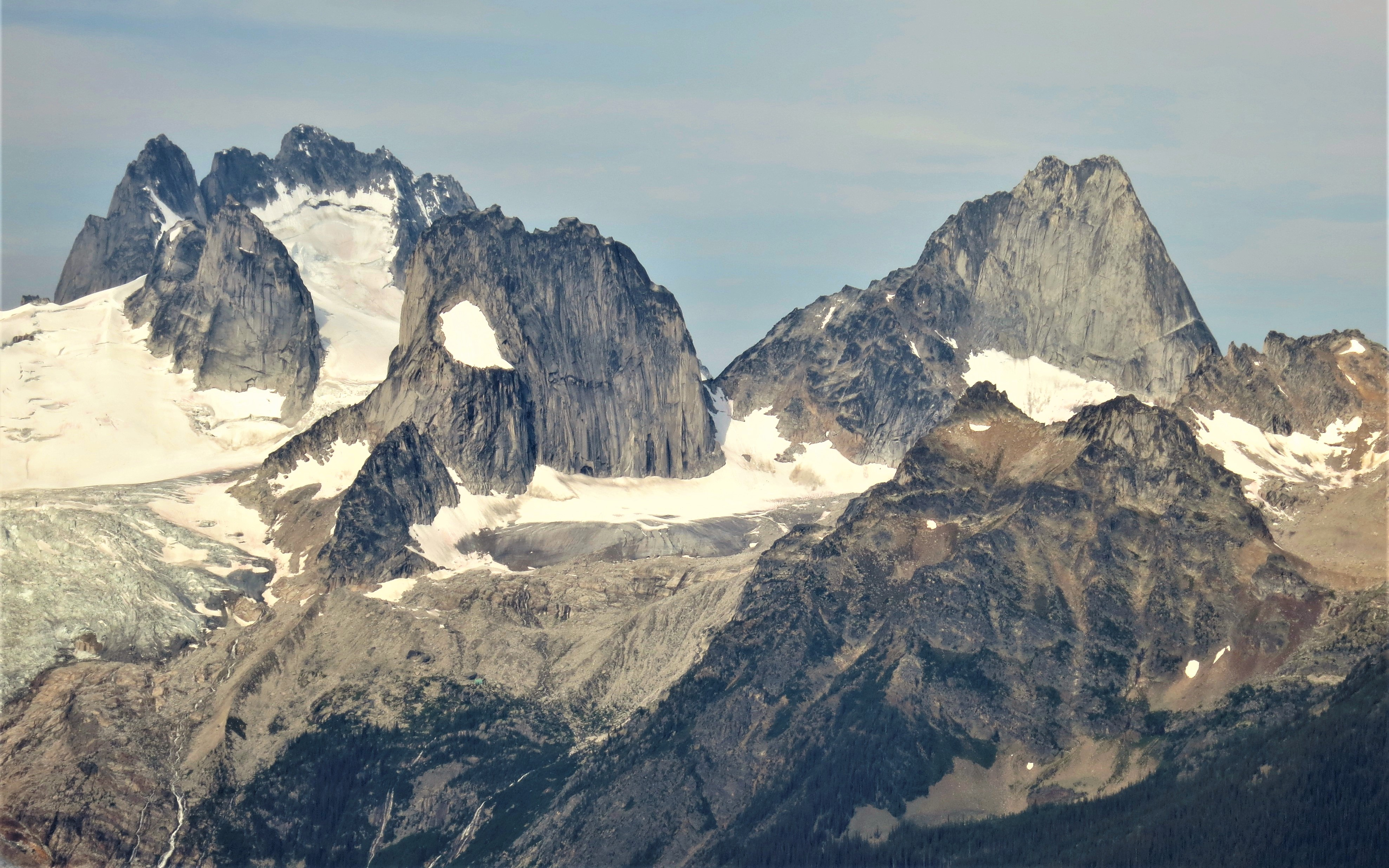
Howser Spire (upper left), Snowpatch Spire (left of center), Bugaboo Spire (upper right), Eastpost Spire (lower right). Camera pointed west.

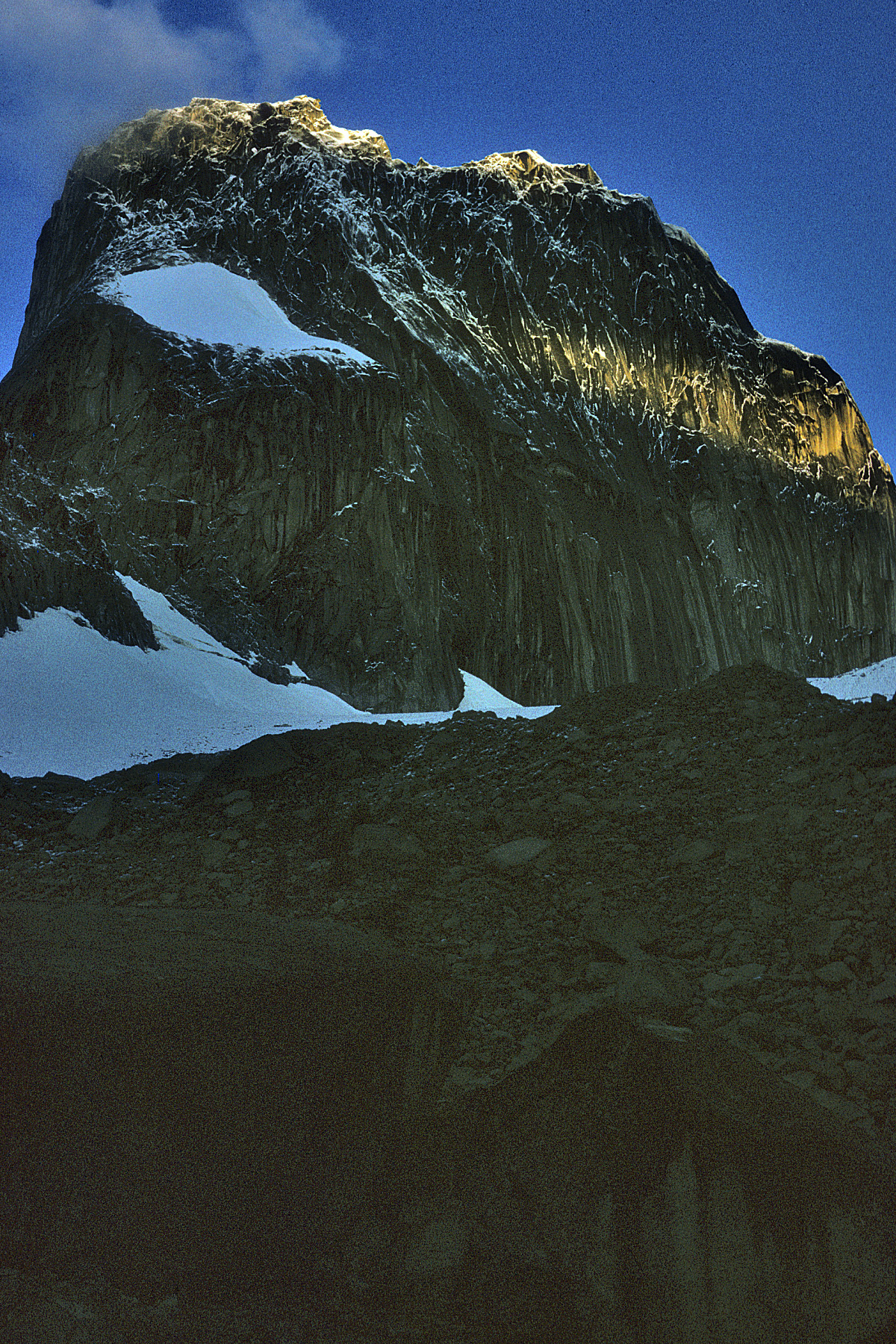

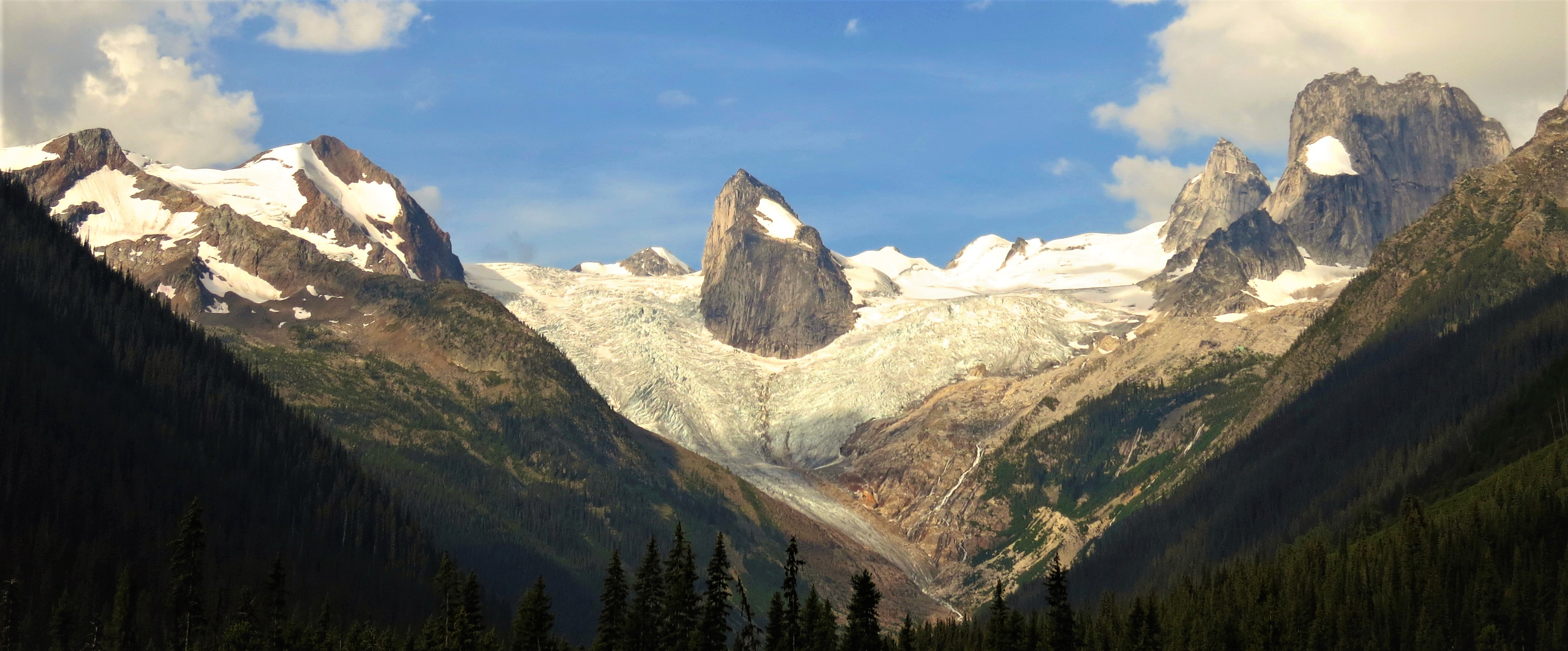
Anniversary Peak (left), Hound's Tooth/Marmolata Spire (centered) in Bugaboo Glacier, and Snowpatch Spire (right). East aspect as viewed from Bugaboo Lodge.
