= Hound's Tooth (mountain) =

Mountain in British Columbia, Canada

Hounds Tooth
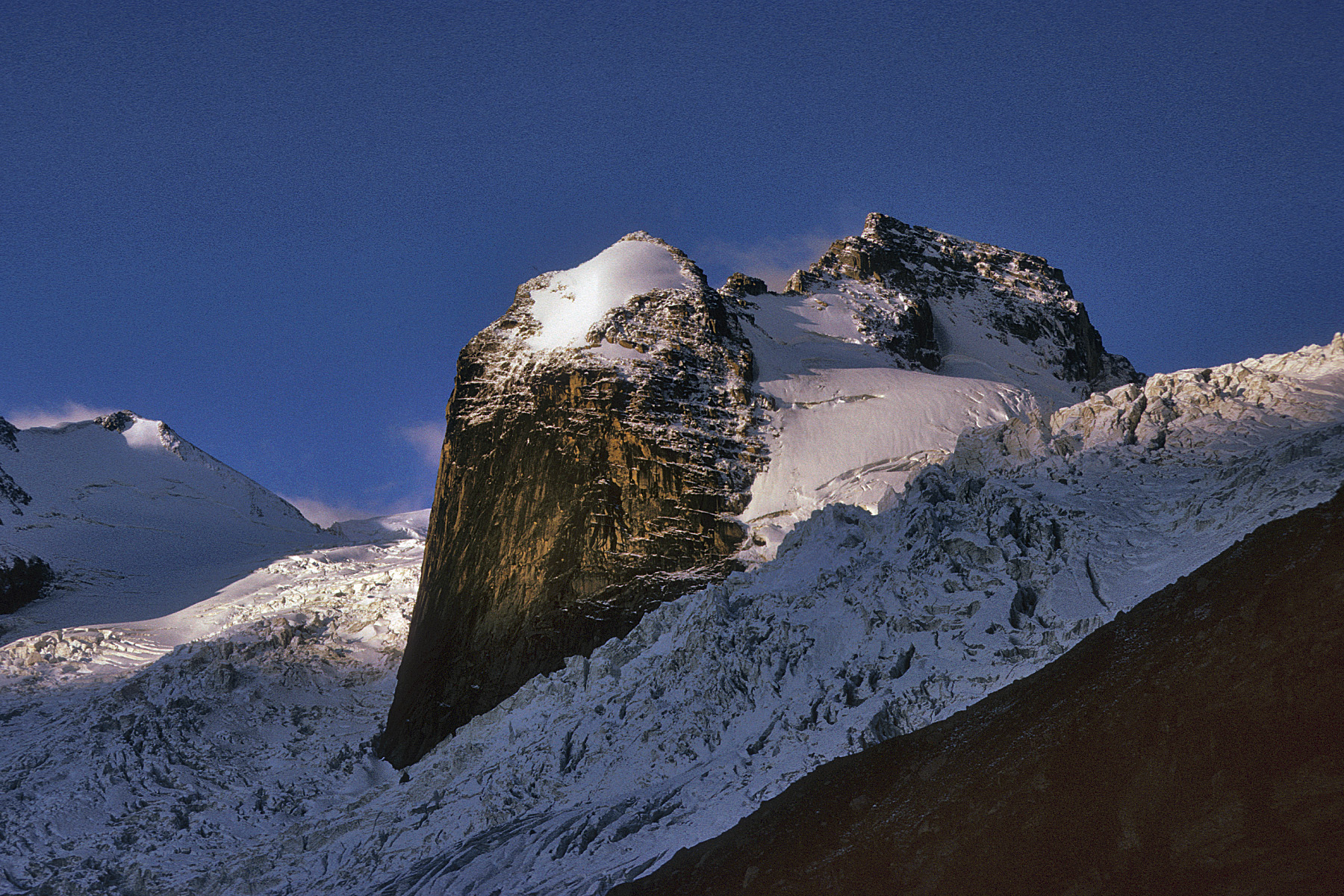
- Hound's Tooth centered

Highest point
- Elevation: 2,824 m (9,265 ft)
- Prominence: 19 m (62 ft)
- Coordinates: 50°43′27″N 116°46′30″W

Geography
- Location within British Columbia
- Country: Canada
- Province: British Columbia
- District: Kootenay Land District
- Protected area: Bugaboo Provincial Park
- Parent range: Purcell Mountains; The Bugaboos
- Topo map: NTS 82K10 Howser Creek

Geology
- Mountain type: Granite

Climbing
- First ascent: 1930 Conrad Kain

Hound's Tooth is a peak in the Purcell Mountains of the Columbia Mountains in southeastern British Columbia, Canada. Hound's Tooth is a rock pinnacle at the end of Marmolata Mountain's northeast ridge. Both mountains are Nunataks, sticking up from the middle of the Bugaboo Glacier. The Hounds' Tooth is composed of a coarse, fractured granite.

== Climate ==
Based on the Köppen climate classification, Hound's Tooth is located in a subarctic climate zone with cold, snowy winters, and mild summers. Winter temperatures can drop below −20 °C with wind chill factors below −30 °C.

== Gallery ==
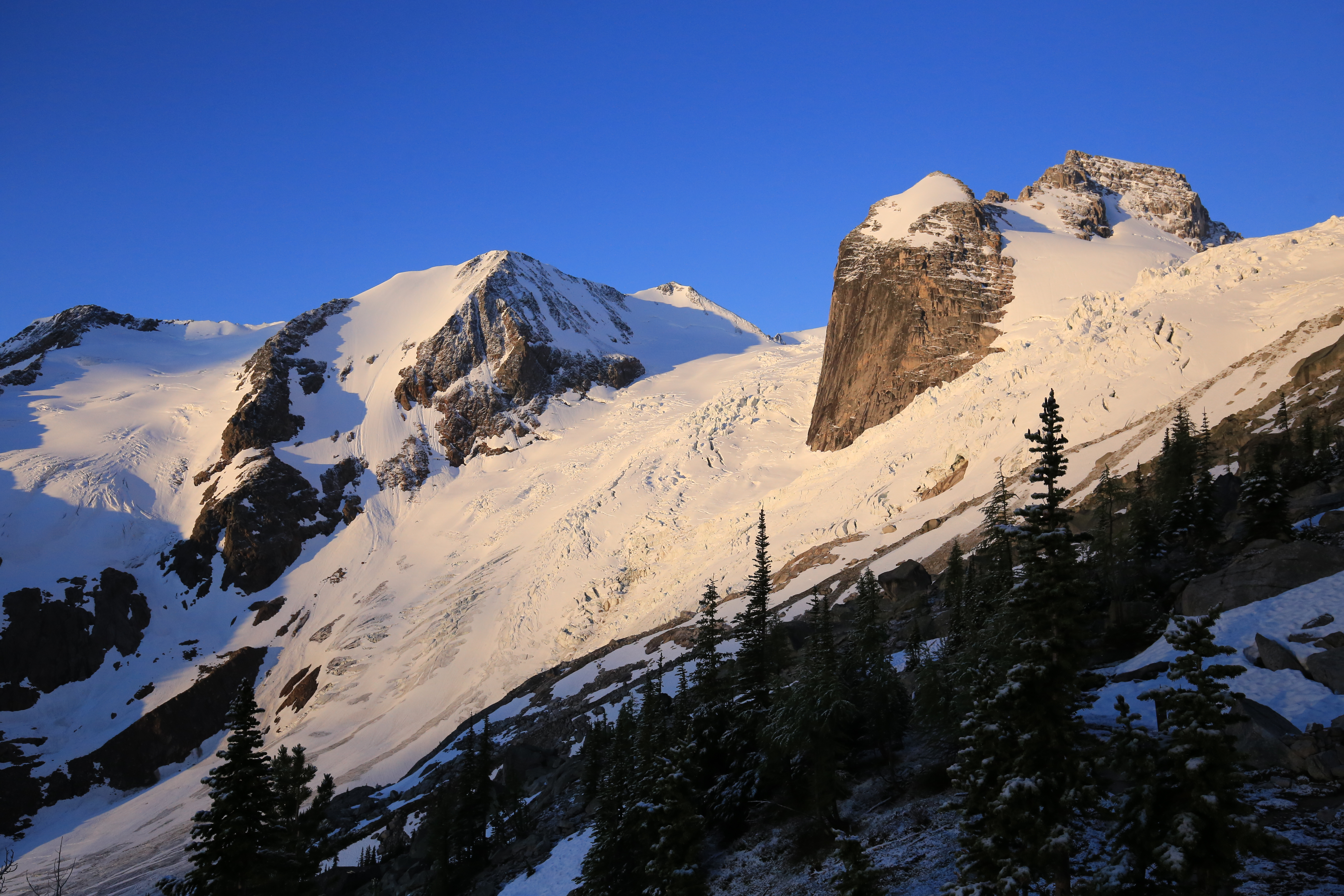
Hound's Tooth is large exposed rock face to right, north aspect
(Anniversary Peak to left)

== See also ==
- The Bugaboos
