= Bugaboo Spire =

Mountain peak in the country of Canada

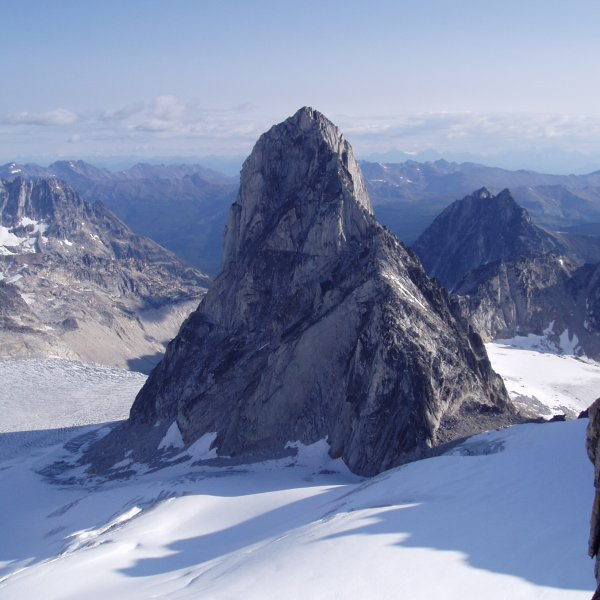
- Bugaboo Spire in the Bugaboos

Highest point
- Elevation: 3,204 m (10,512 ft)
- Prominence: 438 m (1,437 ft)
- Coordinates: 50°44′44″N 116°47′20″W

Geography
- Location within British Columbia
- Location: British Columbia, Canada
- District: Kootenay Land District
- Parent range: Purcell Mountains, East Kootenay
- Topo map: NTS 82K10 Howser Creek

Geology
- Mountain type: Granite

Climbing
- First ascent: 1916 Conrad Kain; Albert MacCarthy, Bess MacCarthy and John Vincent
- Easiest route: PD+, 5.6

Bugaboo Spire is a peak in Bugaboo mountain range in Canada, located between the Vowell and Crescent glaciers, just under 2 km West of the ACC's Conrad Kain hut. It is known for its alpine climbing. The Spire was first climbed by Conrad Kain in 1916.

== Routes ==
- Northeast Ridge (D-, 5.8)

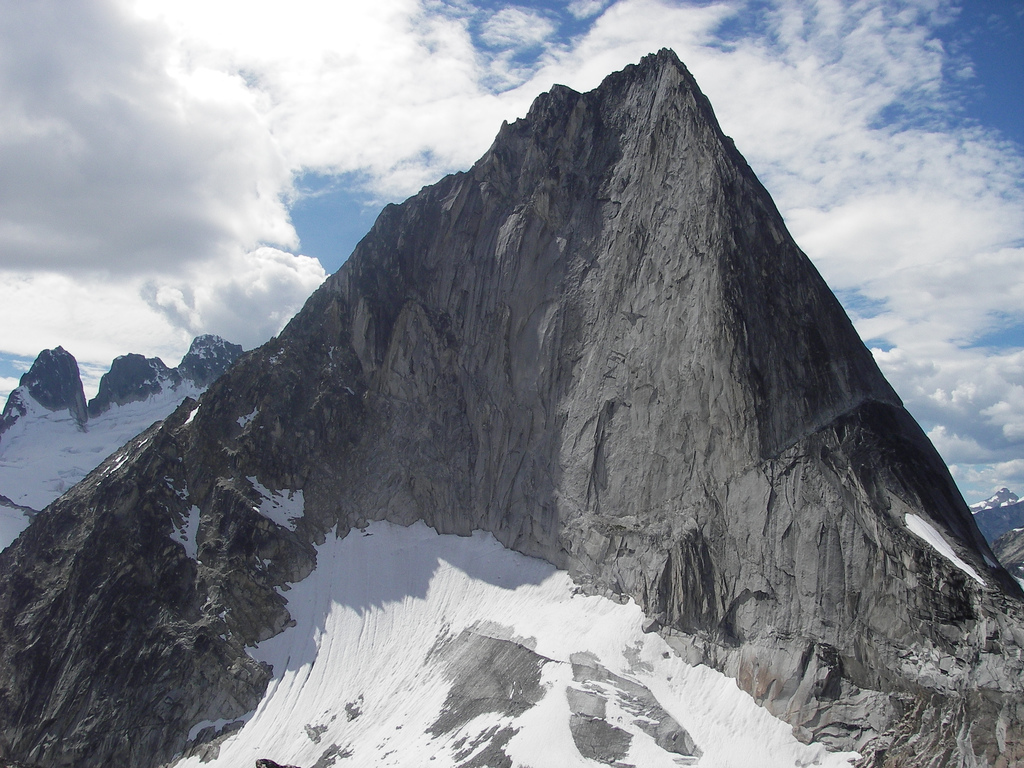
The east face of Bugaboo Spire.

This route tackles the right-hand skyline in the east face photo. Gain the Bugaboo/Crescent col by making your way up the Crescent Glacier to its highest point and scrambling (4th class) up the extreme left side of a slabby grey-green area for about 180m. You are then on the ridge joining Crescent and Bugaboo; follow blocks and a large crack up this to the "rope-up terrace", a white area where dykes on the east face join the ridge. From here, 12 pitches up to 5.8 (or so) gain the north summit. A few meters before the north summit, a rappel (pitons) down the east face about 6m takes you to a ledge. Follow this behind a large boulder and more ledges to a flat area south of the north summit. Follow an exposed 4th class ridge down about 160m to a col and then follow cracks in the slab ahead to a distinct notch. From here, you can rappel down ramps to the south and follow ledges to above the gendarme on the Kain route. Alternatively, you can climb horizontal cracks above at 5.10 to the south summit. From either place, follow the Kain route down; 6 or so rappels and some 4th + 3rd class downclimbing. One of the "50 Classic Climbs of North America"

- Kain Route (PD+, 5.6) This route tackles the left-hand skyline in the east face photo as is commonly used as the descent route for all routes on the spire. After gaining the Bugaboo-Snowpatch col, 3rd class scrambling starts up the ridge following trails and cairns. As height is gained, the route sticks close to the ridge-crest but is always on the Kain Hut basin side of the peak. After a while, some low-5th-class chimneys are reached with a wide, flat ledge at the base. These are scaled in one long (~60m) pitch or two shorter ones; a rappel station exists halfway up. At the top, a section of 4th class ridge is traversed for about 150m to the base of the gendarme-pitches. There is a bolted station at a notch just after the 4th-class terrain. Two pitches (or one long one) from here start up the ridge crest, follow horizontal cracks on the right (east) side past a few old pitons and cross over the ridge to the west side near the top on a lower-angled slab. Cross the slab (with a small roof above it) and gain a corner, which leads to the left side of the gendarme (there is a bolted rappel station on the gendarme). From here, follow a ledge/gully system up left and then back right to the south summit. The descent is somewhat different: rappel from the south summit, then from the gendarme on the EAST side (not the way you came up) about 25m to a ledge. Scramble up to a notch between a flake and rappel about 20m diagonally to another station and another, similar rappel from which a few metres of scrambling gains the ridge at the beginning of the 4th class section. Traverse this to the one 60m or two 30m rappels down the chimneys. Retrace the ascent route from here, being careful to stay far enough skier's-right (despite trails and some cairns to the contrary).

== See also ==
- Snowpatch Spire
- Pigeon Spire
- Crescent Spire
