= Crescent Towers =

Mountains in British Columbia, Canada

Crescent Towers, The Bugaboos
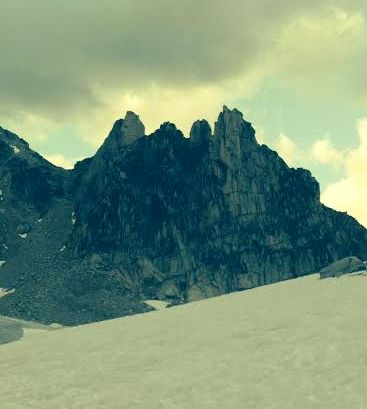
- Crescent Towers

Highest point
- Coordinates: 50.75028°N 116.77722°W

Geography
- Location: British Columbia, Canada
- Parent range: Purcell Mountains, Columbia Mountains
- Topo map: NTS 82K10 Howser Creek

Geology
- Mountain type: Granite

Crescent Towers are towers just east of Crescent Spire and south of Eastpost Spire in the Purcell Mountains of the Columbia Mountains in southeastern British Columbia, Canada. Crescent towers consist of the North tower, two Central towers, and the two southernmost towers named "Donkey Ears" because they resemble the ears of the animal.

== Routes ==
=== North Tower ===
- North Ridge, 5.6
- Northwest Side, 5.4

=== Central Towers ===
- Northwest Gully, 4th
- Lion's Way, 5.6
- Lions and Tigers, 5.8
- Tiger's Trail, 5.9
- Lost in Space, 5.10+

=== South Towers (Donkey's Ears) ===
- Thatcher Cater, 5.10
- Edwards-Neufeld, 5.10+
- Ears Between, 5.7
- Eeyore, 5.9
