= Conrad Kain Hut =

Mountain hut in Canada

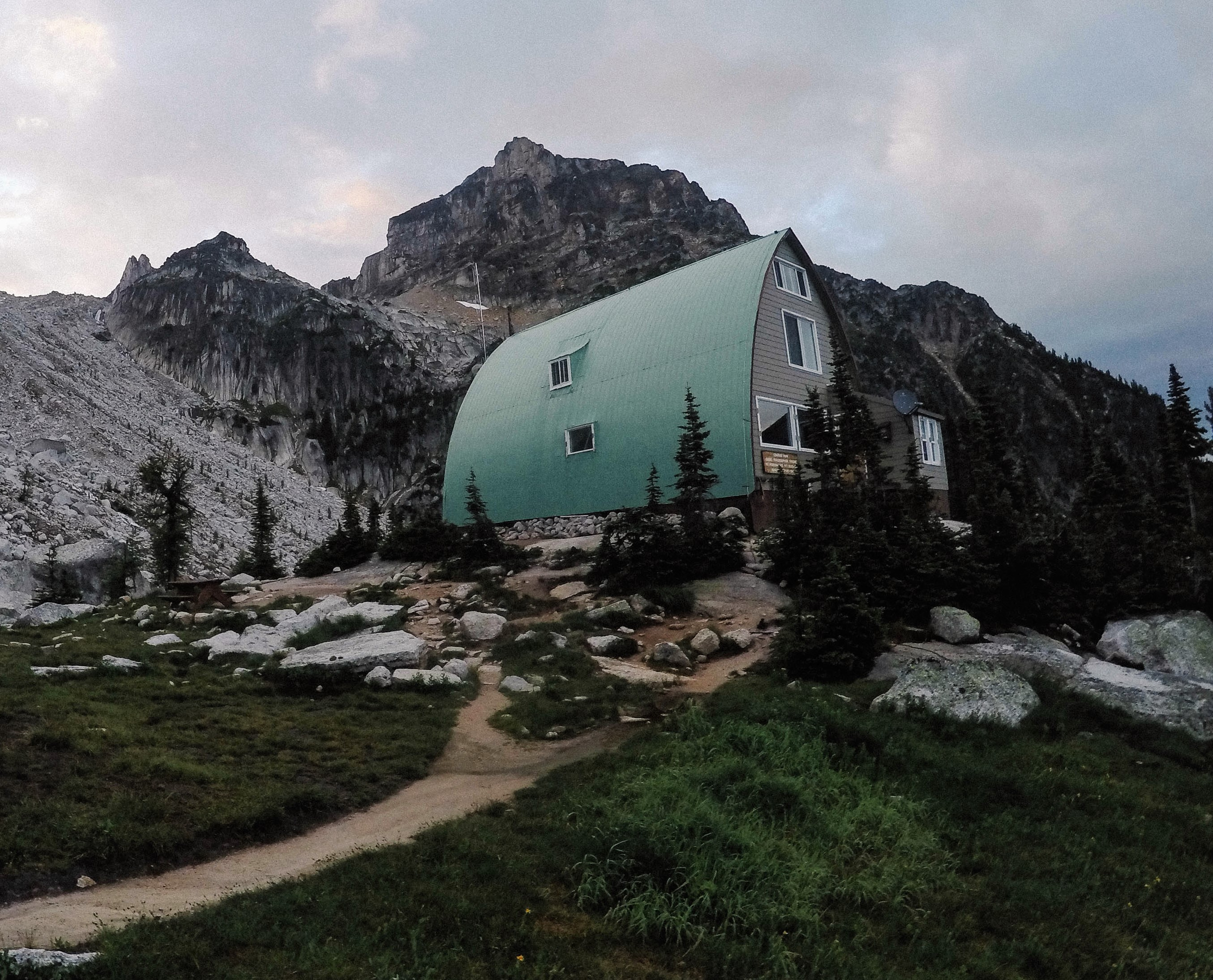
- Conrad Kain Hut and Eastpost Spire
- Interactive map of the Conrad Kain Hut area

General information
- Type: alpine hut
- Architectural style: Wood Framed Steiner Arch
- Location: Bugaboo Provincial Park, Canada
- Coordinates: 50°44′18″N 116°45′48″W
- Opened: 1972
- Owner: Alpine Club of Canada

Technical details
- Material: Metal Clad Wood

Design and construction
- Architect: Alpine Club of Canada

The Conrad Kain hut is an alpine hut located in Bugaboo Provincial Park in British Columbia. The hut is maintained by the Alpine Club of Canada. Coordinates: 50°44′18″N 116°45′48″W NAD27 11U 516700 5620754

The hut was erected in 1972 and named after the renowned alpinist Conrad Kain who first visited the area in 1910. It was maintained by BC Parks until 2000, when responsibility was handed over to the Alpine Club.

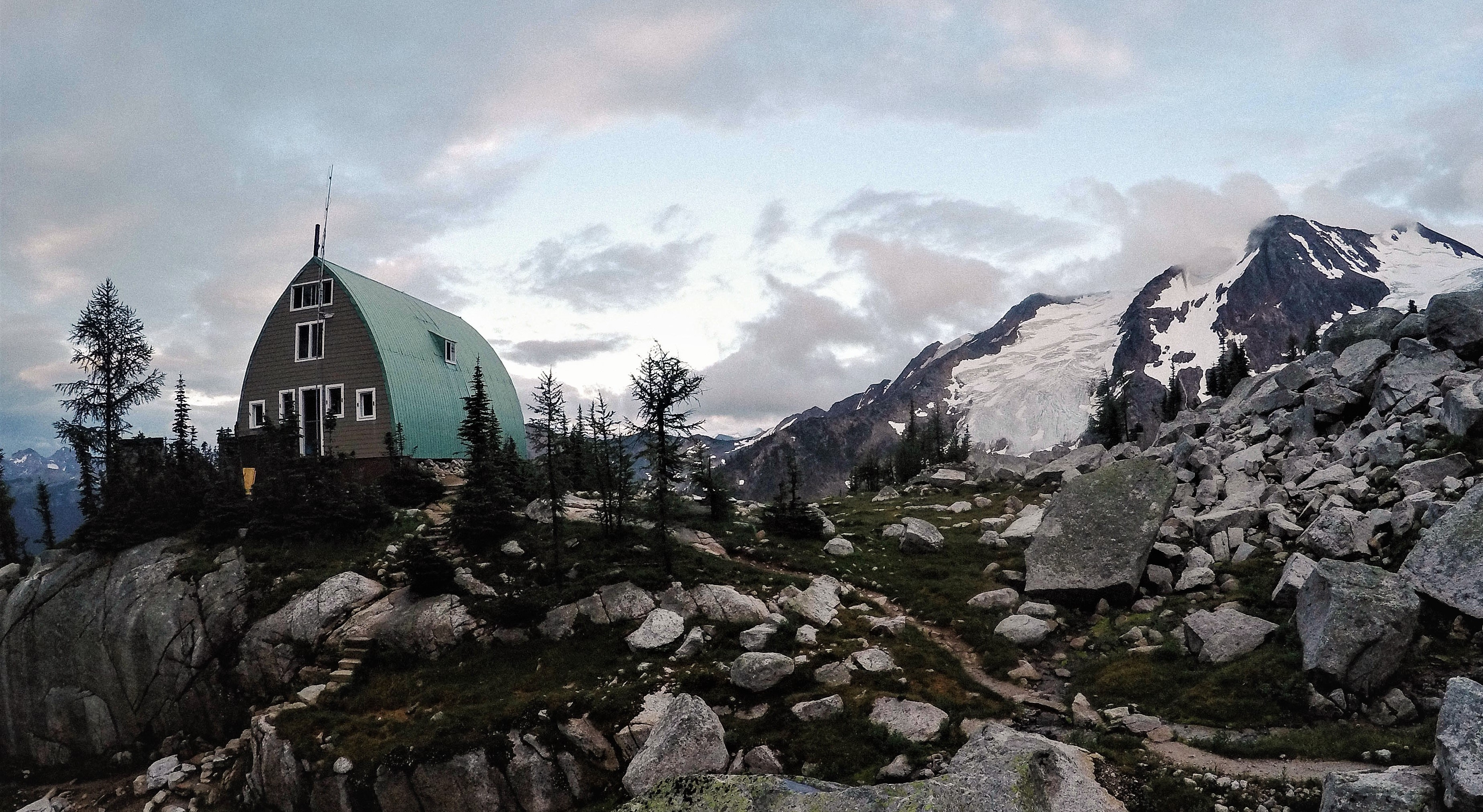
Conrad Kain Hut with Anniversary Peak in the background

The hut can be reached via a 3.5 km hike from the parking area (with 700m of elevation gain). The parking area is reached via a 45 km logging road from Brisco, North of Radium Hot Springs on Highway 95. BC Parks recommends that those who leave their cars here attempt to protect, with fences that are provided, their rubber hoses and cables (including brake cables) from the habits of the local porcupines. The hut is out of range of all cellular service.

The hut can accommodate about 40 sleepers comfortably. It is furnished with methane-powered lamps and a stove, along with hydro-electric power for electric lights, cooking, heating and even hot water. During the summer months, the hut houses a custodian from the Alpine Club of Canada, whose job is to collect fees, maintain the hut, and provide information about climbing in the area. It is the responsibility of the visiting climbers to clean up after themselves and leave the hut in better condition than when they arrived.

== Nearby ==
- Bugaboo Spire
- Snowpatch Spire
- Pigeon Spire
- Brenta Spire
- The Howsers
