= Marmolata Mountain =

Nunatak in the country of Canada

Marmolata Mountain, The Bugaboos
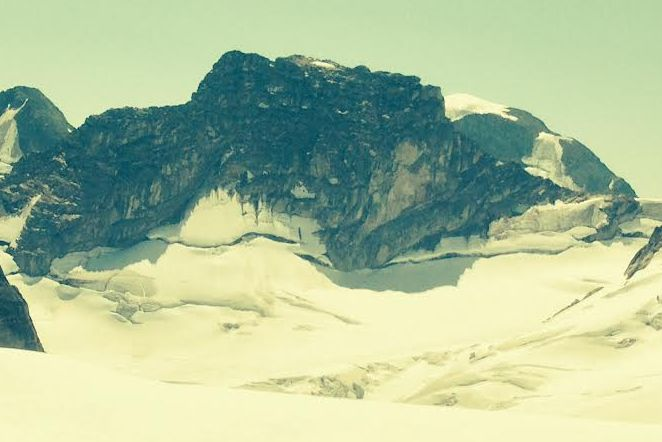
- Marmolata Mountain

Highest point
- Elevation: 3,019 m (9,905 ft)
- Prominence: 149 m (489 ft)
- Coordinates: 50°43′16″N 116°46′55″W

Geography
- Location: British Columbia, Canada
- District: Kootenay Land District
- Parent range: Purcell Mountains, Columbia Mountains
- Topo map: NTS 82K10 Howser Creek

Geology
- Mountain type: Granite

Climbing
- First ascent: August, 1930 Conrad Kain; Peter Kaufmann; O.E. Cromwell

Marmolata Mountain is a nunatak in the Purcell Mountains of the Columbia Mountains in southeastern British Columbia, Canada. It was named in 1930 by Eaton Cromwell because he thought it looked similar to the highest of the Italian Dolomites.

== Gallery ==
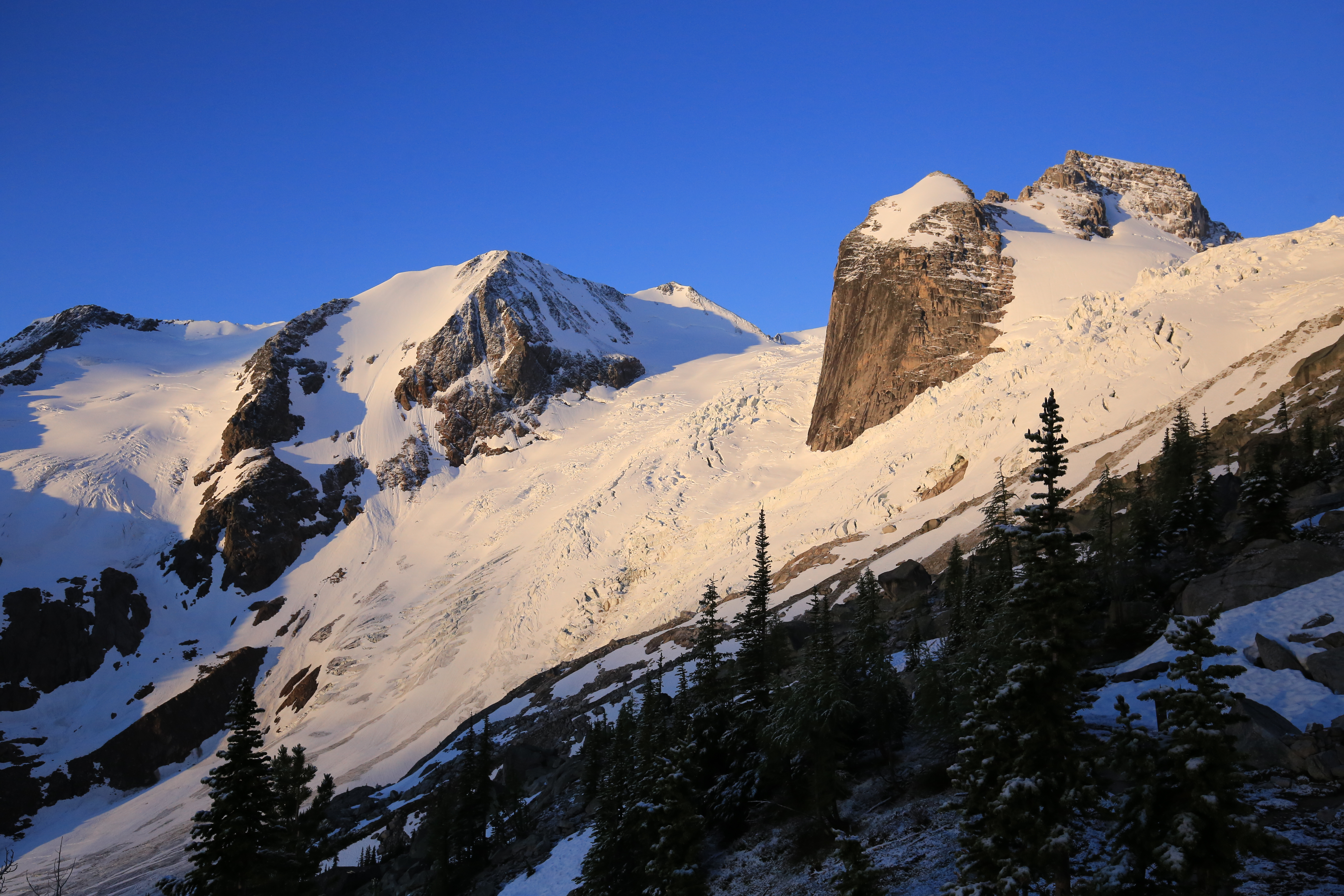
Marmolata in upper right corner, north aspect (Anniversary Peak to left)
