= Nasswald Peak =

Mountain in Alberta and British Columbia, Canada

- Location within Alberta Location within British Columbia Location within Canada

Highest point
- Elevation: 3,042 m (9,980 ft)
- Prominence: 632 m (2,073 ft)
- Parent peak: Beersheba Peak (3054 m)
- Listing: Mountains of Alberta; Mountains of British Columbia
- Coordinates: 50°59′56″N 115°39′07″W

Geography
- Country: Canada
- Provinces: Alberta and British Columbia
- Protected areas: Banff National Park and Assiniboine Provincial Park
- Parent range: Park Ranges
- Topo map: NTS 82J13 Mount Assiniboine

Climbing
- First ascent: 1913 Conrad Kain, Boundary Commission

Nasswald Peak is located on the border of Alberta and British Columbia on the Continental Divide. It was named in 1913 by the Interprovincial Boundary Survey after Nasswald, a town in Austria.

== See also ==
- List of peaks on the British Columbia–Alberta border
