= The Bugaboos =

Mountain range in British Columbia, Canada

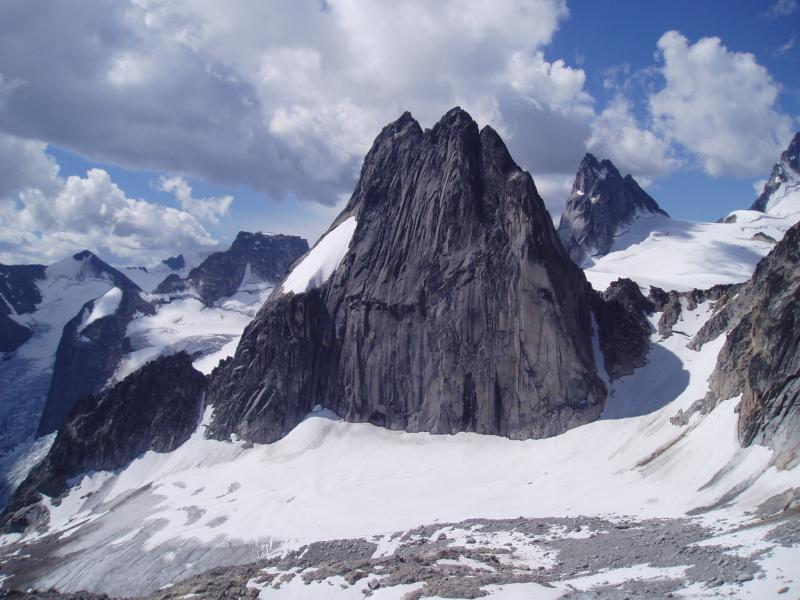
- Snowpatch Spire in the Bugaboos

Highest point
- Peak: Howser Spire
- Elevation: 3,412 m (11,194 ft)
- Coordinates: 50°44′45″N 116°47′21″W

Geography
- Country: Canada
- Province: British Columbia
- Parent range: Purcell Mountains

Geology
- Rock type: Granite batholith

The Bugaboos are a mountain range in the Purcell Mountains of eastern British Columbia, Canada. The granite spires of the group are a popular mountaineering destination. The Bugaboos are protected within Bugaboo Provincial Park.

== Geography ==
The Bugaboos are located in the northwestern extreme of the Purcells in the Columbia Mountains, in the south-east of the province. The nearest towns are Radium and Golden. They are commonly subdivided into four divisions: the Bugaboo Glacier Peaks, and the Eastern, Central, and Western Spires. The nearby Vowell and Conrad Groups are usually considered separate from the Bugaboos.

== Geology ==
Located in the snow- and rain-heavy "Columbia Wet Belt", this section of the Purcells is subject to heavy erosion and large, active glaciers. Originally covered in weaker rock, glaciation eventually revealed the granodiorite batholiths which form the group's distinctive spires. The surrounding rock is approximately 600 million to 1 billion years old, while the Bugaboo intrusion dates to 135 million years ago. The igneous intrusion cooled slowly, forming the crystalline structure of the hard granite found today.

== History ==
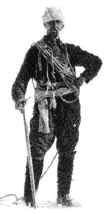
Conrad Kain

Originally named the "Nunataks", the Bugaboo spires were first noted by a surveying expedition in the late 1800s. Mining brought the first Europeans to the region with a small, ill-fated gold rush occurring in 1895 and 1896 near Bugaboo Falls. The area was prospected and staked, but the meager deposits turned out to be mostly pyrite and galena. The name "Bugaboo" originated from this rush; the term was used by prospectors for a "dead-end".

Climbers became interested in the group shortly after. In 1910, an expedition led by Thomas Longstaff and surveyor Arthur Oliver Wheeler entered the area. They were guided by renowned European climber Conrad Kain. Kain would return to the area six years later and pioneer many difficult climbing routes. The Austrian climber described his route up Bugaboo Spire as his most difficult Canadian ascent, more challenging than his celebrated route up Mount Robson, the highest peak in the Canadian Rockies. Along with Albert and Bess McCarthy and others, Kain would pioneer first ascents of North Howser, Marmolata, and Crescent Spires.

Logging in the area resulted in road construction in the 1950s and 60s. This led to a new influx of climbers. Fred Beckey and Yvon Chouinard (founder of the Patagonia clothing company) established new routes on several spires. The growing popularity of the area led the BC government to establish Bugaboo Glacier Provincial Park and the Bugaboo Alpine Recreation Area in 1969. The Alpine Club of Canada constructed a large hut in 1972 to reduce environmental damage to the fragile alpine meadows below the spires.

== Climbing and recreation ==
The Bugaboos have several internationally known rock climbing routes. The Beckey-Chouinard (South Howser Spire), West Ridge (Pigeon Spire), Northeast Ridge (Bugaboo Spire), Snowpatch and Surf's Up (Snowpatch Spire) attract world-class climbers. There are both bolted and free routes throughout the group.

Climbers and hikers often use the 40-person Conrad Kain hut, maintained by the Alpine Club of Canada. Located near Snowpatch Spire, the hut replaced the original fibreglass igloos placed by BC Parks. The Bugaboo Lodge, constructed in 1967, is near the eastern boundary of the park. Heli-skiing and heli-hiking are conducted from the lodge into the park. Ski touring is also popular in the group during the winter.

== Spires ==
- Howser Spire (3,412 m; 11,194 ft − North Tower)
- South Howser Tower (3,364 m; 11,037 ft)
- Bugaboo Spire (3,204 m; 10,512 ft)
- Pigeon Spire (3,156 m; 10,354 ft)
- Snowpatch Spire (3,084 m; 10,118 ft)
- Marmolata Mountain (3,019 m; 9,905 ft)
- Brenta Spire (2,958 m; 9,705 ft)
- Crescent Spire (2,842 m; 9,324 ft)
- Crescent Towers (2,830 m; 9,280 ft)
- Hound's Tooth (2,830 m; 9,280 ft)
- Eastpost Spire (2,697 m; 8,848 ft)
- Northpost Spire (2,919 m; 9,577 ft)
- Cobalt Lake Spire (2,682 m; 8,799 ft)

== Gallery ==
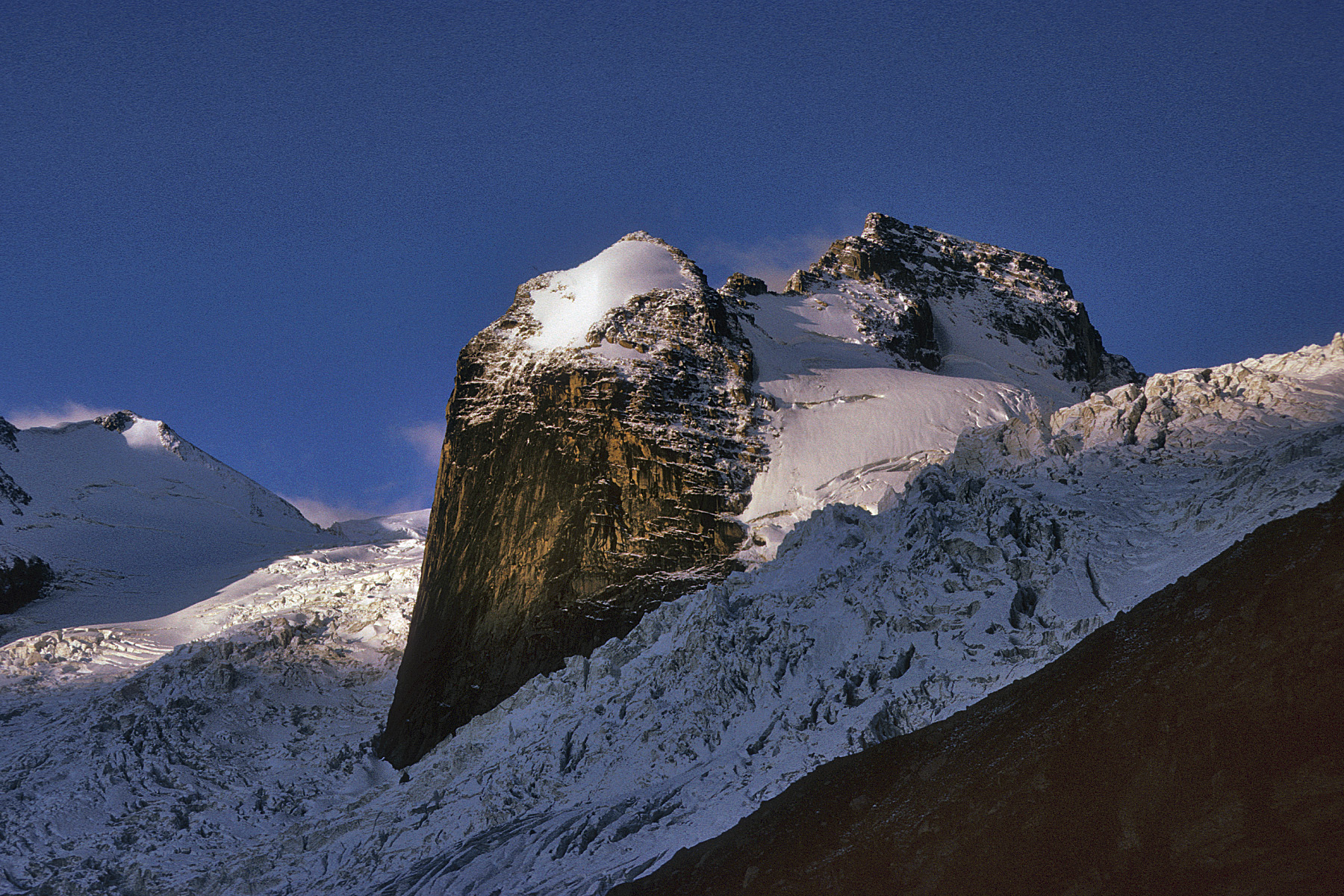
Marmolata Spire and Hound's Tooth

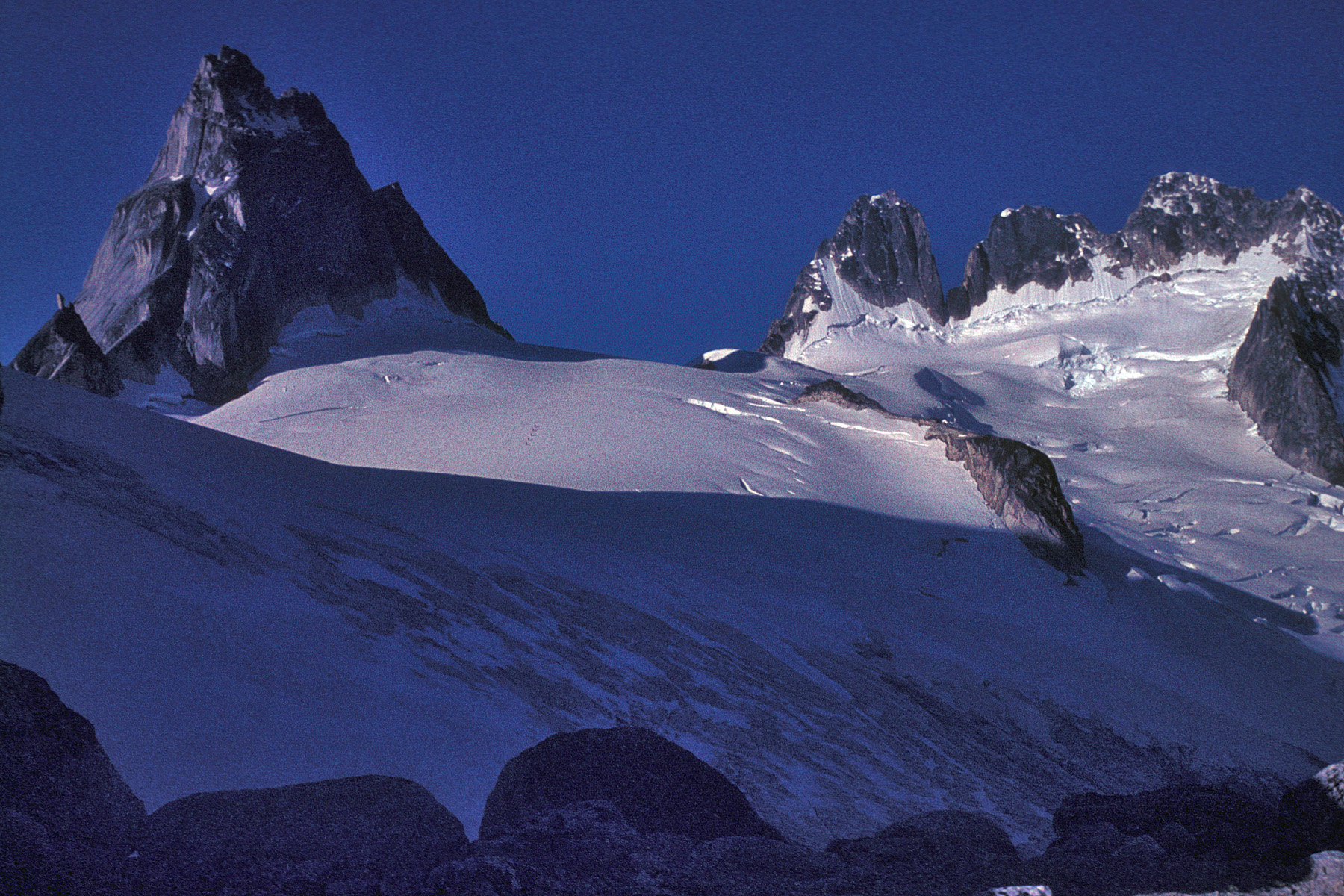
Pigeon Spire and Howser Spires

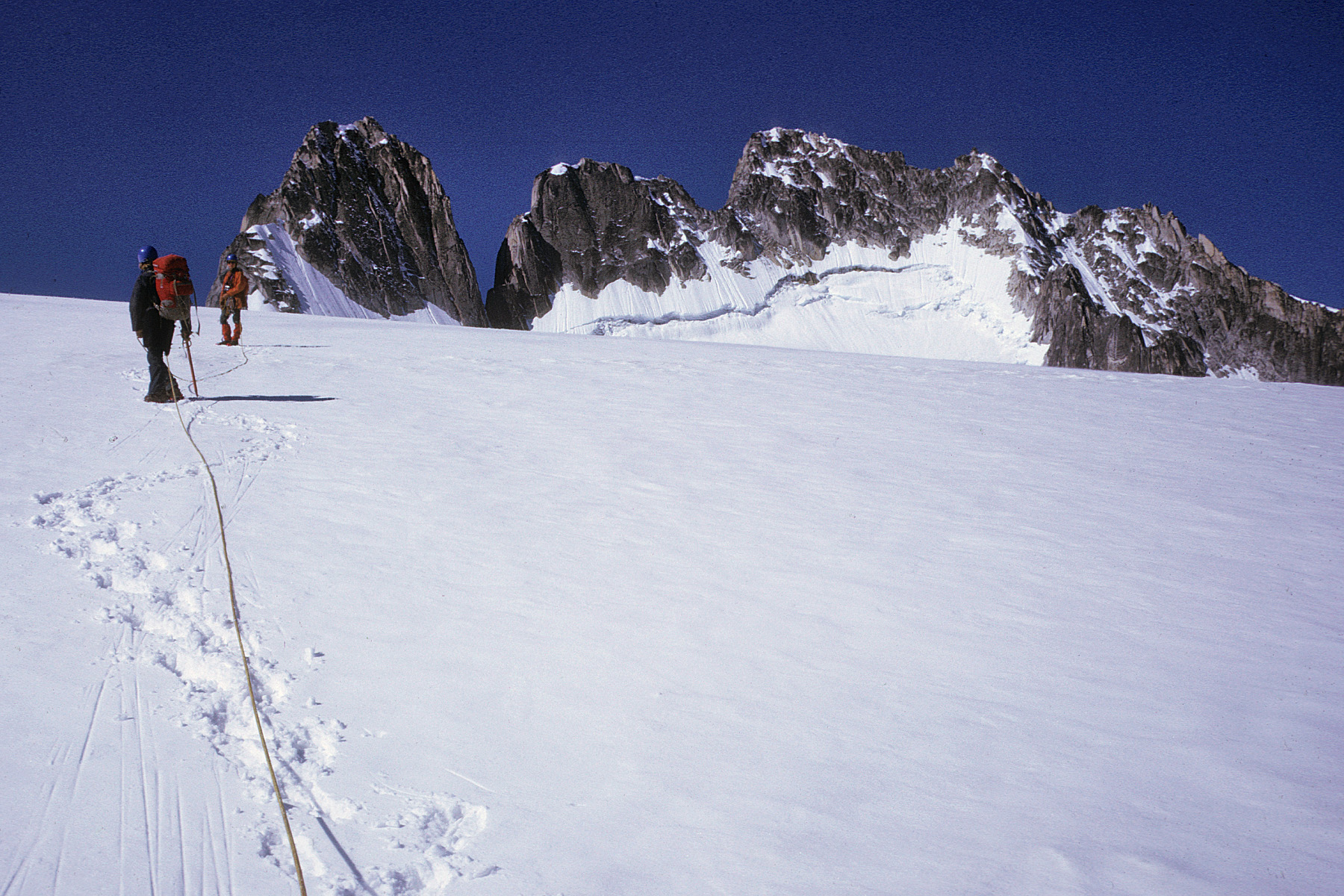
Howser Spires from glacier

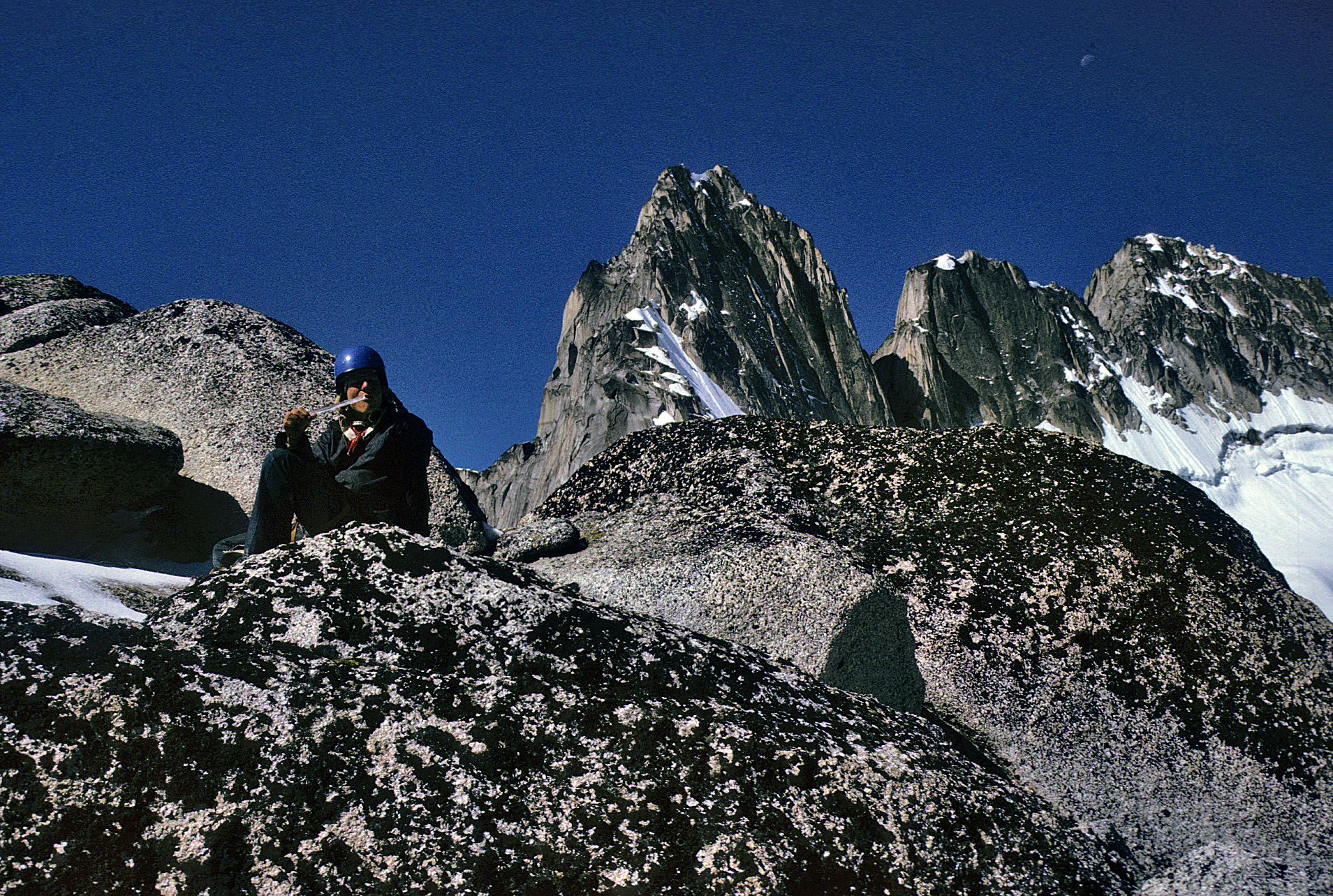
Summit of Pigeon Spire

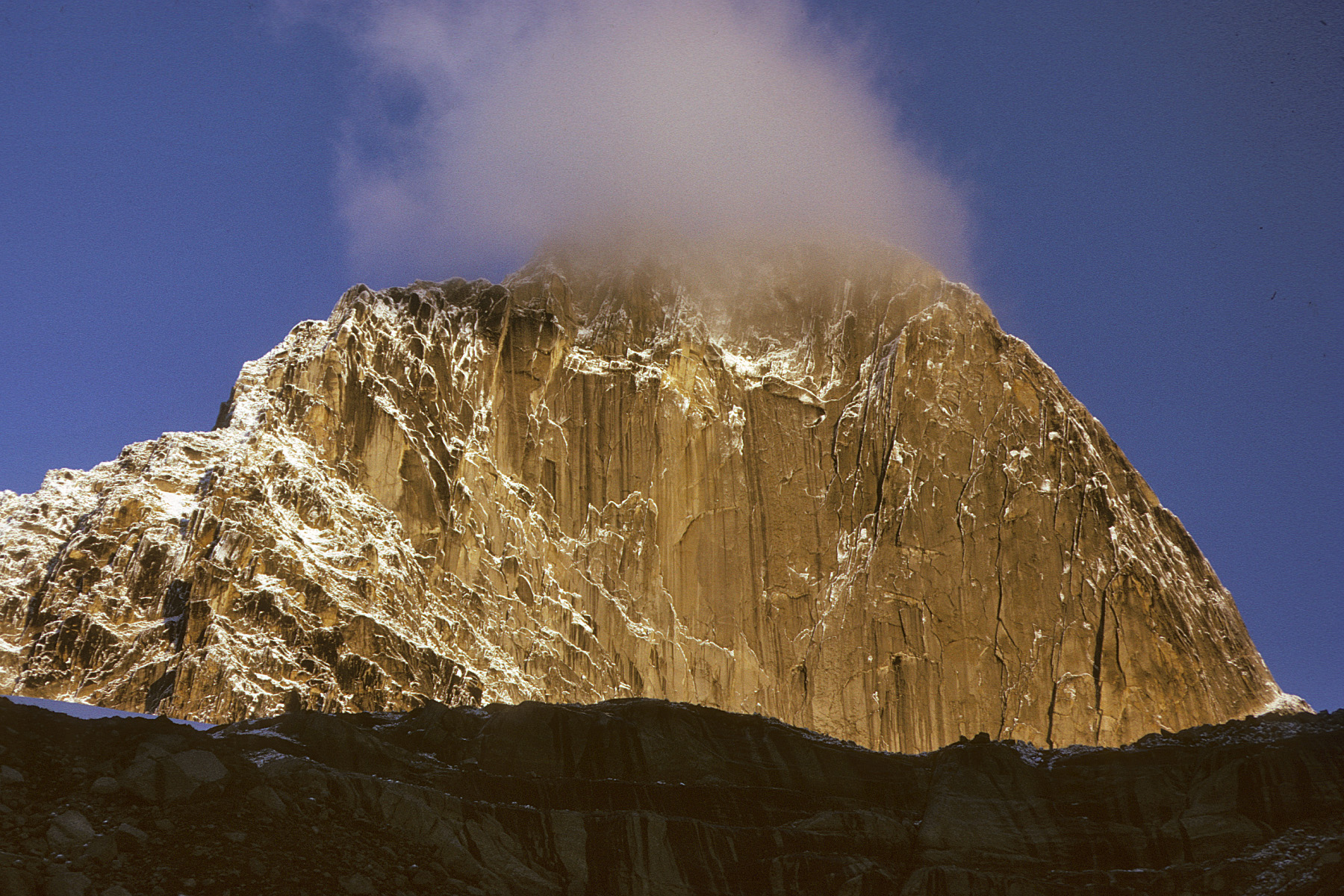
Bugaboo Spire at sunrise

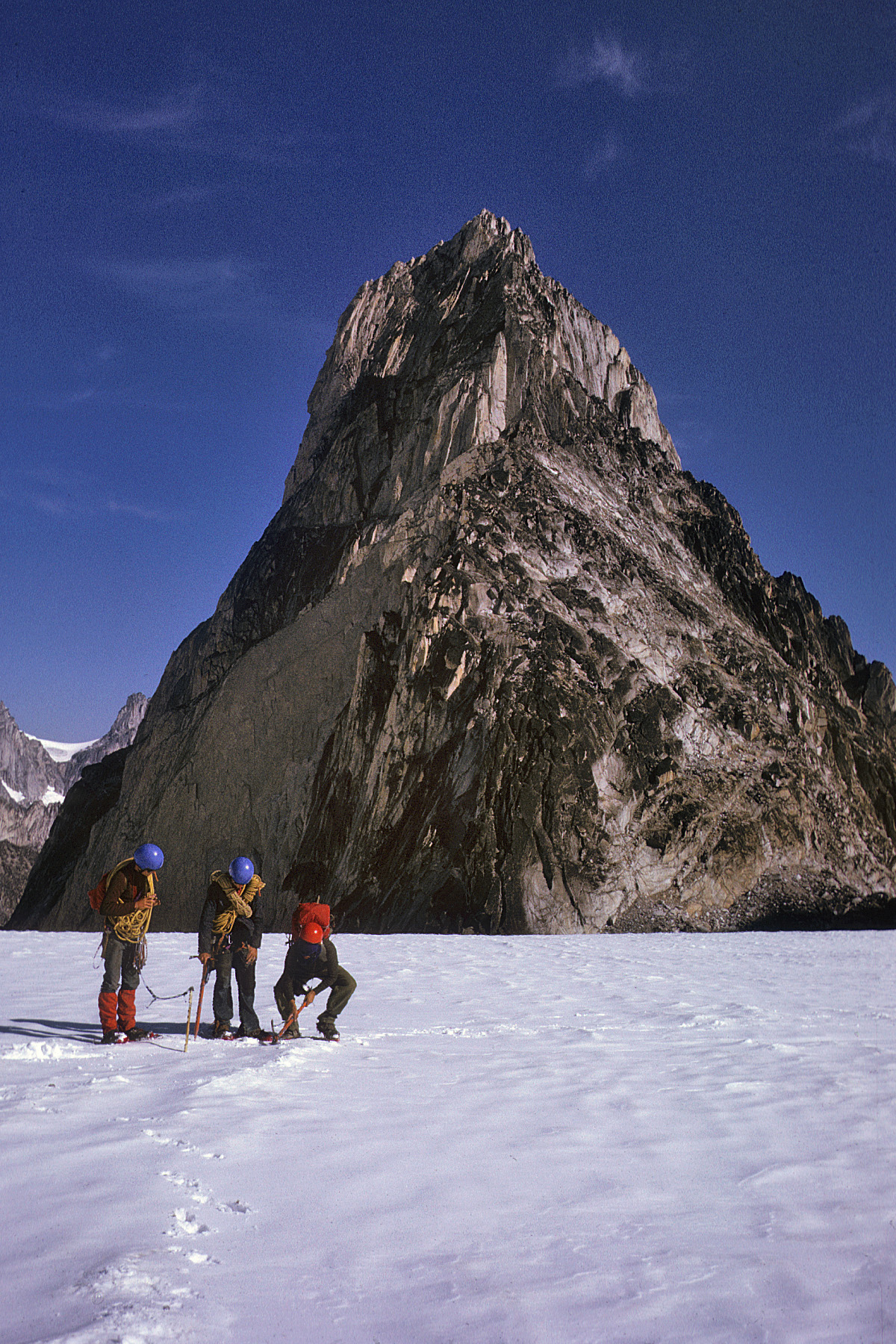
Climbers rope up below Bugaboo Spire

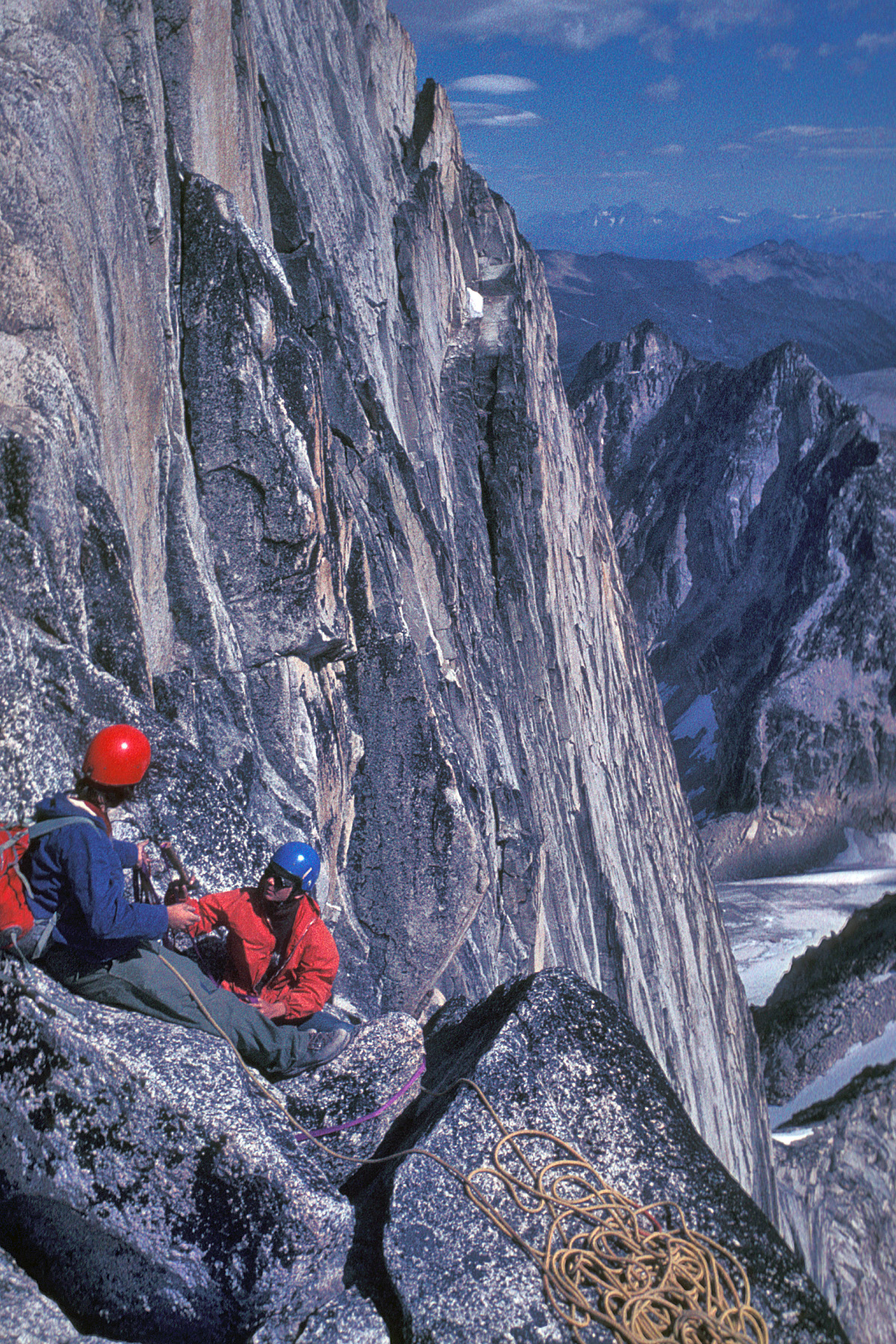
Climbers rest on Bugaboo Spire

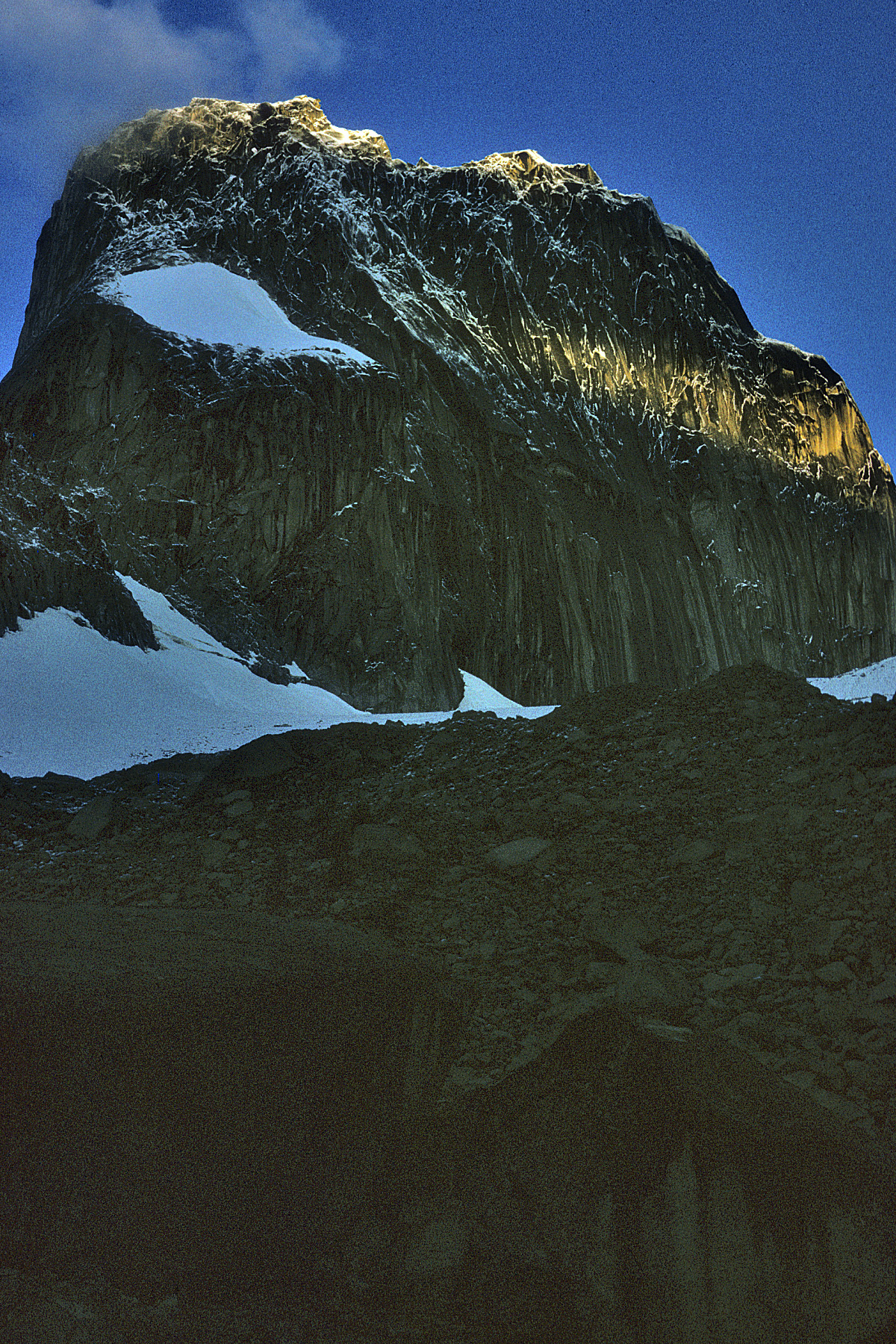
Snowpatch Spire
