= Crescent Spire =

Mountain in the country of Canada

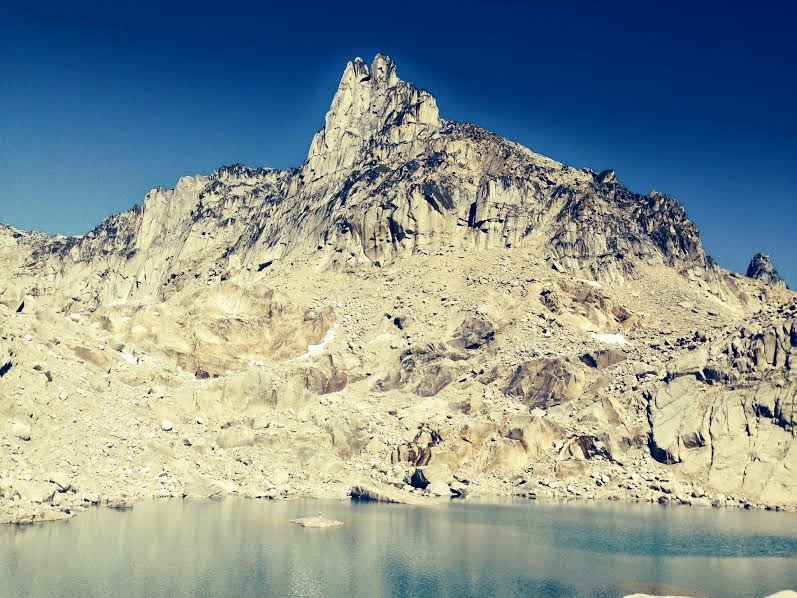
- Crescent Spire

Highest point
- Elevation: 2,842 m (9,324 ft)
- Prominence: 92 m (302 ft)
- Coordinates: 50°45′01″N 116°46′38″W

Geography
- Location within British Columbia
- Interactive map of
- Location: British Columbia, Canada
- District: Kootenay Land District
- Parent range: Purcell Mountains, Columbia Mountains
- Topo map: NTS 82K10 Howser Creek

Geology
- Mountain type: Granite

Climbing
- First ascent: June 1933 Conrad Kain; J. Thorington

Crescent Spire is a peak in the Purcell Mountains of the Columbia Mountains in southeastern British Columbia, Canada. Crescent Spire was named in 1933 by James Monroe Thorington because he was impressed with its shape.

== Routes ==
- West Ridge 5.4 / 180m
- WIMTA 5.10- / 5 pitches
- Clean and Dirty 5.10 / 6 pitches
- Paddle Flake Direct 5.10 / 6 pitches
- Paddle Flake 5.10 / 6 pitches
- Left Dihedral 5.11 / 6 pitches
- Westside Story 5.11 / 6 pitches
- Roof McTech 5.10+ / 2 pitches
- Energy Crisis 5.11+ / 2 pitches
- McTech Arete 5.10- / 6 pitches
- Mc Tech Direct 5.10 / 6 pitches
- Woza Moya / 5.10- / 6 pitches
- Dunlop's Dangle 5.10- / 6 pitches
- Surprisingly Subsevere 5.10 / 6 pitches
- Northeast Ridge 5.6 / 300m

== See also ==
- The Bugaboos
