= Anniversary Peak =

Mountain in British Columbia, Canada

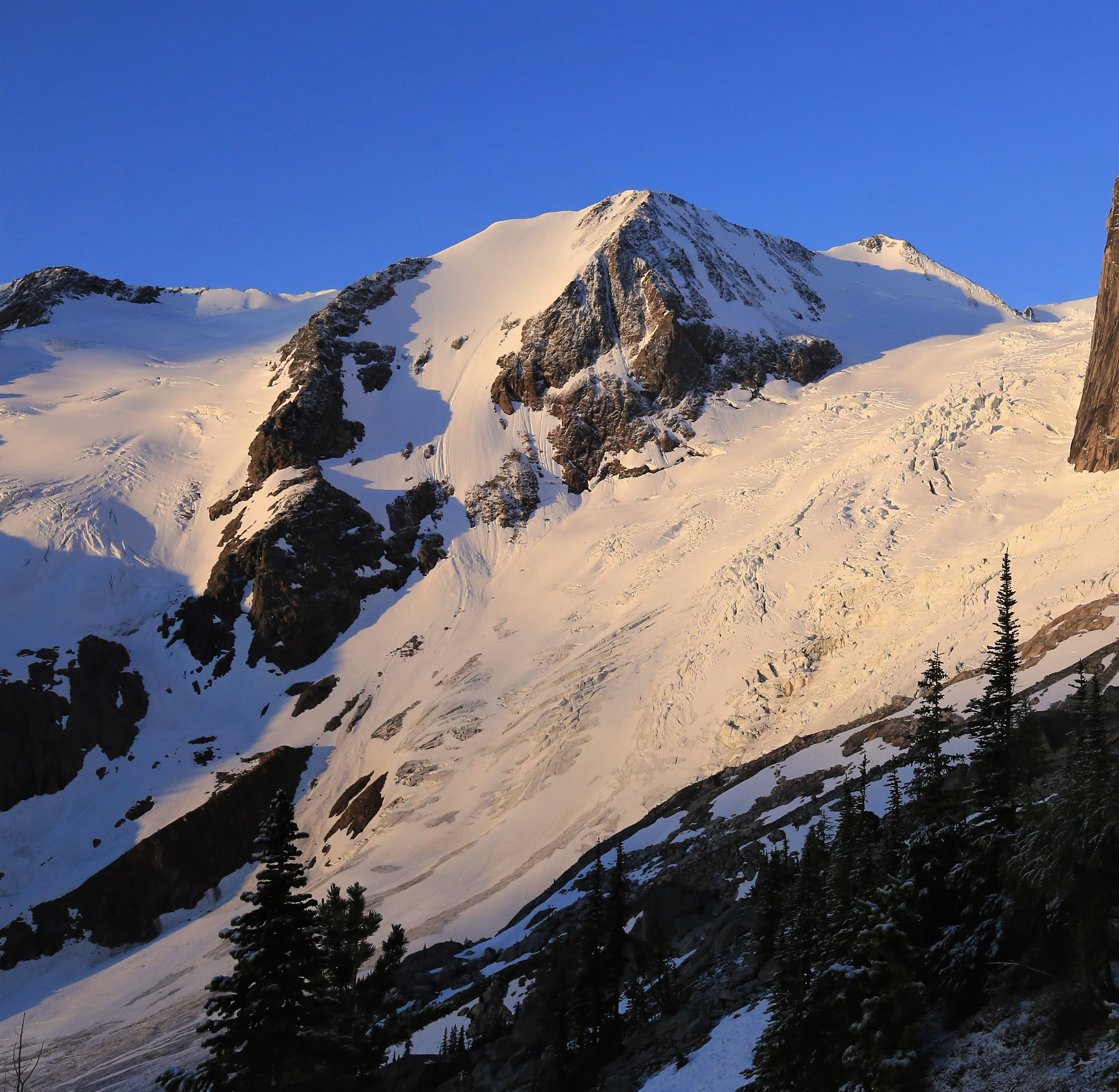
- North aspect

Highest point
- Elevation: 2,947 m (9,669 ft)
- Prominence: 39 m (128 ft)
- Parent peak: Howser Peak (3,094 m)
- Listing: Mountains of British Columbia
- Coordinates: 50°42′57″N 116°46′03″W

Geography
- Location within British Columbia Location within Canada
- Interactive map of Anniversary Peak
- Country: Canada
- Province: British Columbia
- District: Kootenay Land District
- Protected area: Bugaboo Provincial Park
- Parent range: Purcell Mountains; The Bugaboos
- Topo map: NTS 82K10 Howser Creek

Geology
- Rock age: 135 Million years ago
- Rock type: Granodiorite

Climbing
- First ascent: 1946

Anniversary Peak is a 2,947-metre (9,669-foot) summit in The Bugaboos of British Columbia, Canada. It is located southeast of the Bugaboo Glacier, on the southern boundary of Bugaboo Provincial Park. Precipitation runoff from Anniversary Peak drains into Bugaboo Creek which is a tributary of the Columbia River. Anniversary Peak is more notable for its steep rise above local terrain than for its absolute elevation as topographic relief is significant with the summit rising 1,350 meters (4,429 ft) above Bugaboo Creek in 4 km (2.5 mi).

== History ==
Anniversary Peak was climbed by 43 persons of the Alpine Club of Canada in five parties in July 1946. The club so-named the peak because it was the 40th anniversary of the club's inception. The mountain's toponym was published in "A Climber's Guide to the Interior Ranges of British Columbia" by J.M. Thorington in 1947, and it was officially adopted on October 29, 1962, by the Geographical Names Board of Canada.

== Climate ==
Based on the Köppen climate classification, Anniversary Peak is located in a subarctic climate zone with cold, snowy winters, and mild summers. Winter temperatures can drop below −20 °C with wind chill factors below −30 °C. This climate supports the Bugaboo Glacier below the peak's northwest slope.

== Gallery ==
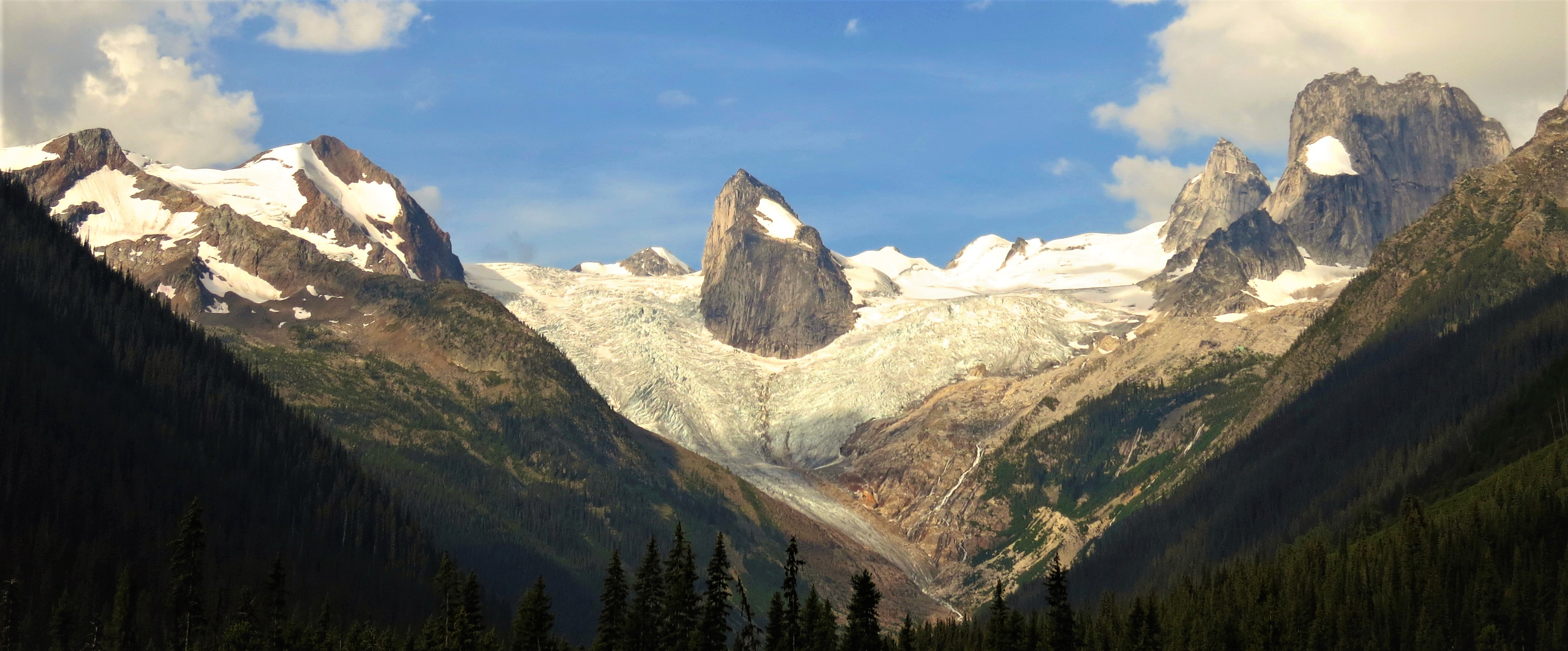
Anniversary Peak (left), Hound's Tooth/Marmolata Spire (centered) in Bugaboo Glacier, and Snowpatch Spire (right). East aspect.

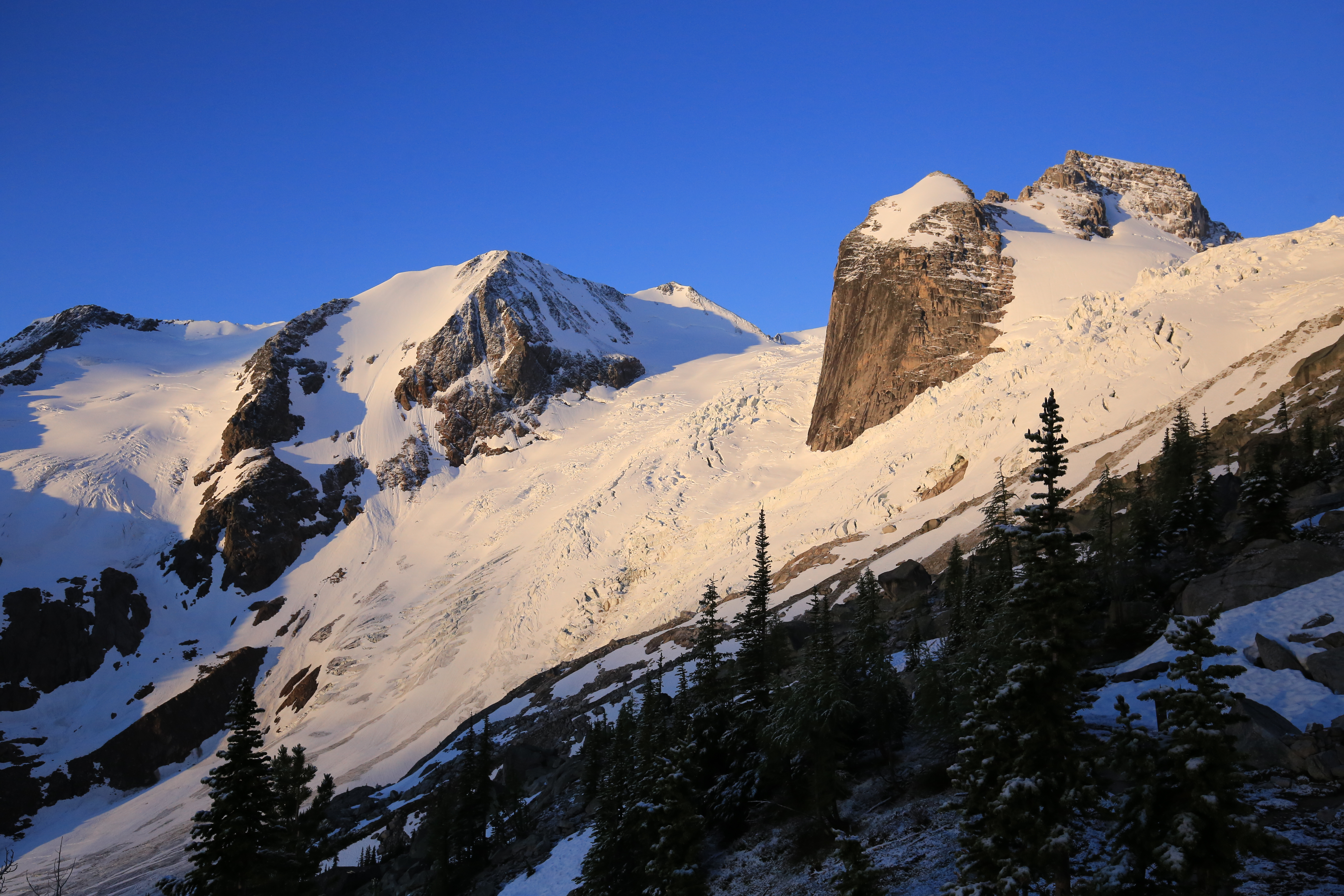
Anniversary Peak (left), with Hound's Tooth/Marmolata Spire to right.

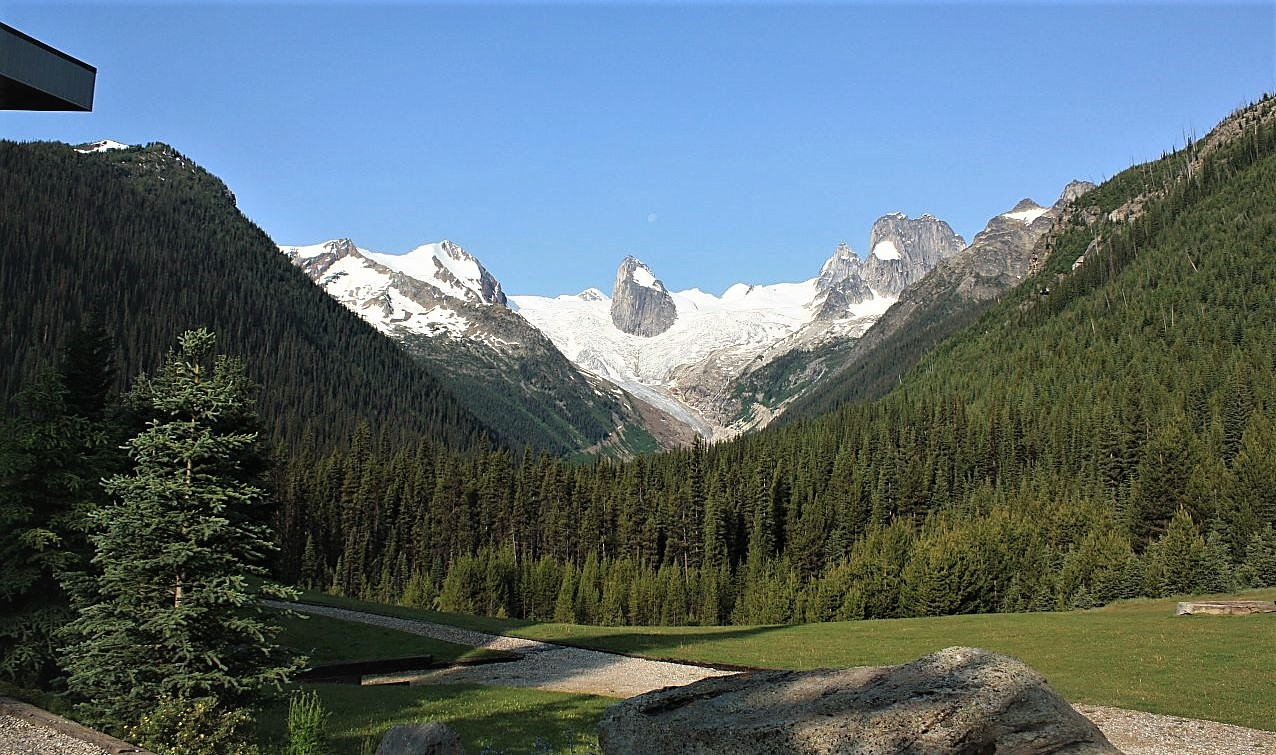
View from the Bugaboos Lodge. Left to rightː Anniversary Peak, Hound's Tooth, Bugaboo Glacier, and Snowpatch Spire.

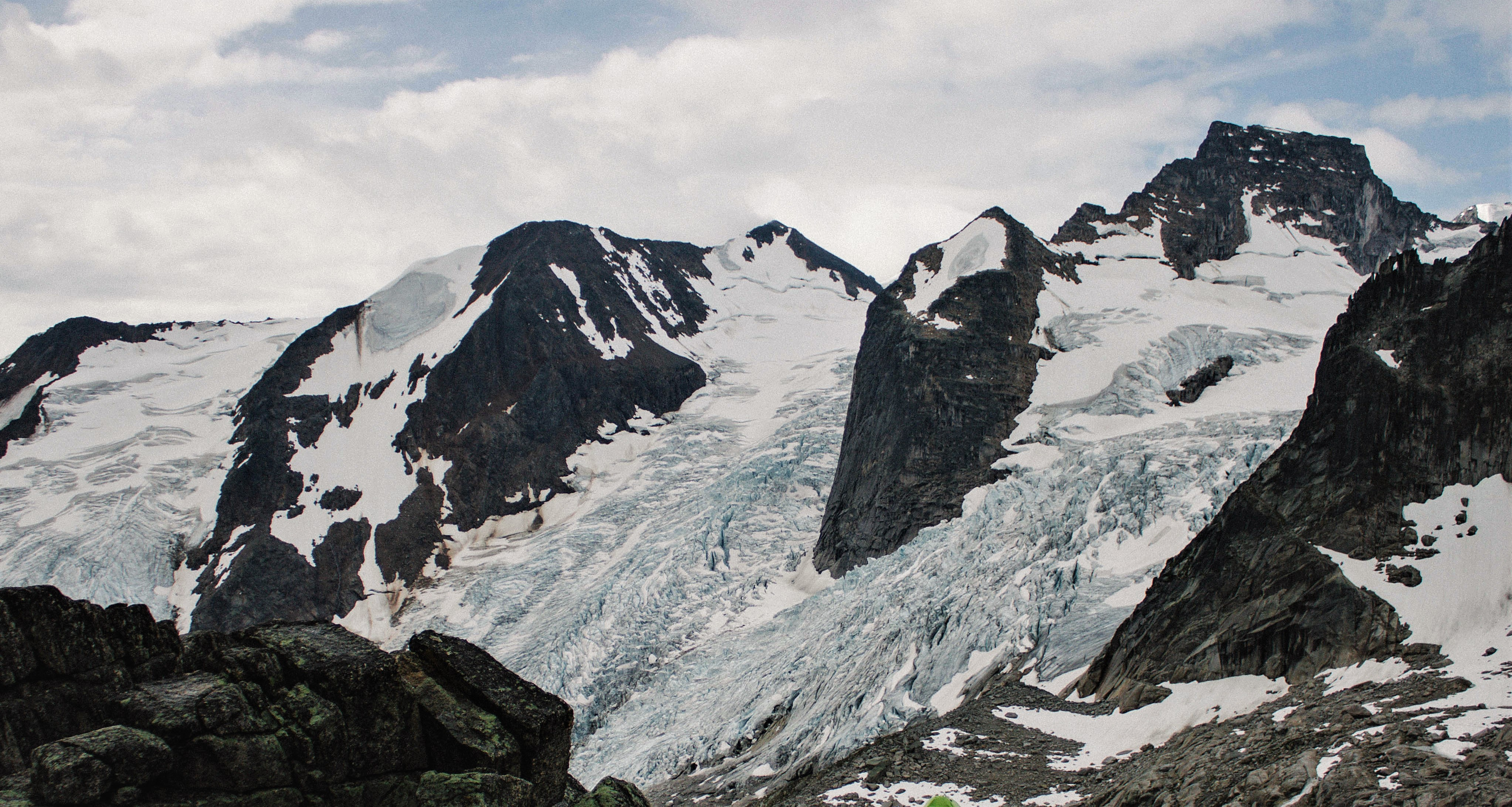
Anniversary Peak (left of center) and Marmolata Mountain seen from Applebee Dome

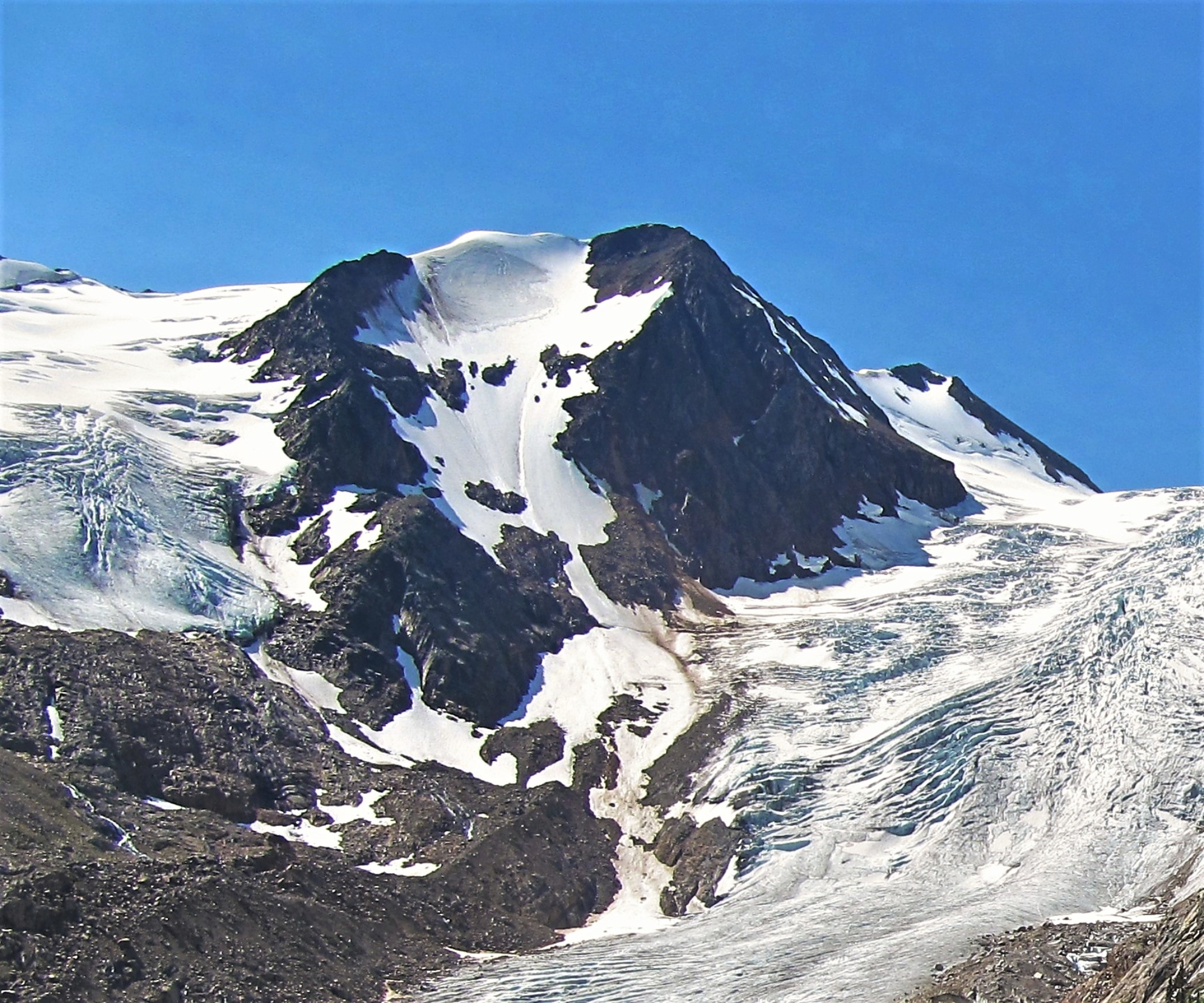

== See also ==
- The Bugaboos
- Geography of British Columbia
