= Pigeon Spire =

Mountain in British Columbia, Canada

Pigeon Spire, The Bugaboos
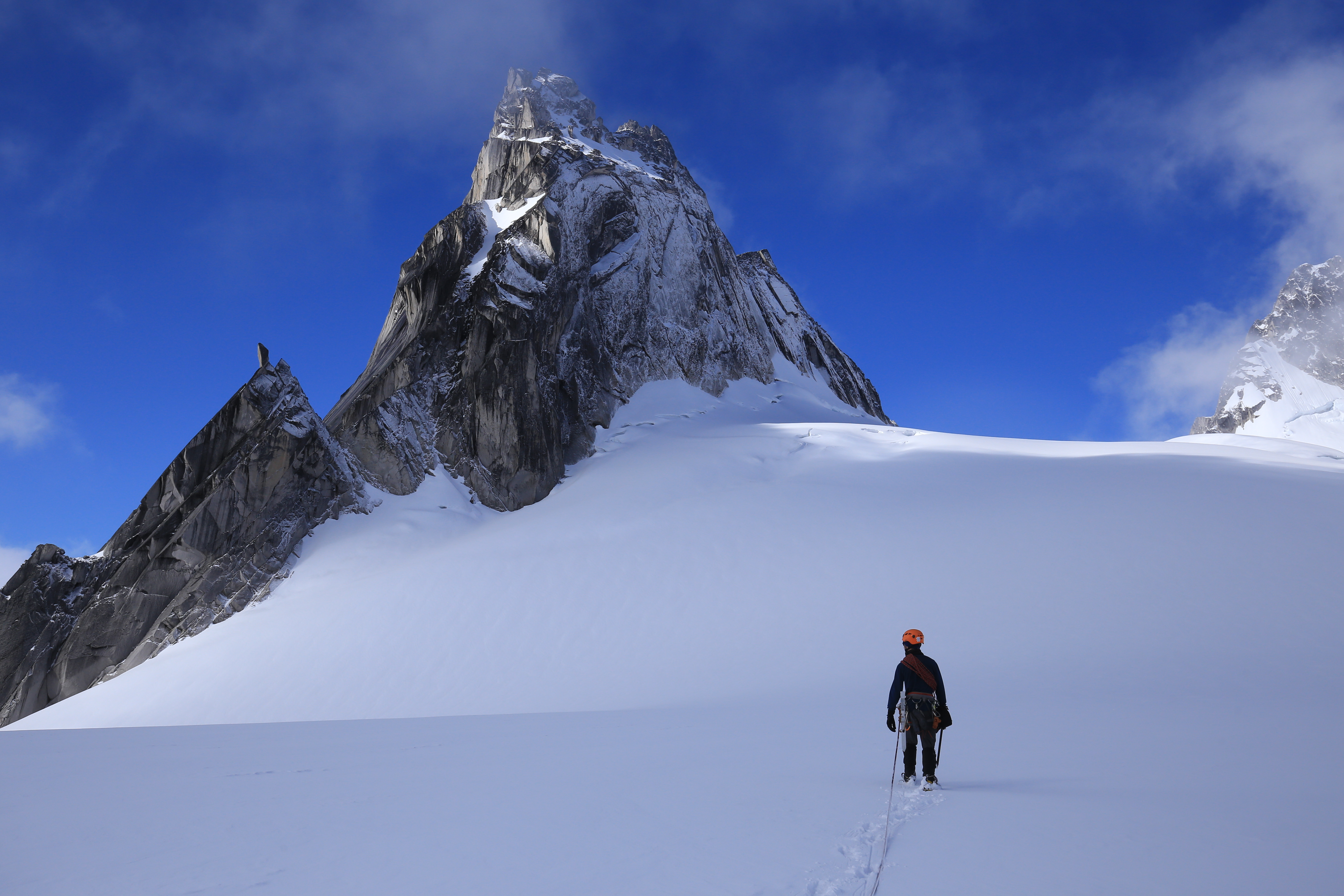
- Pigeon Spire

Highest point
- Elevation: 3,156 m (10,354 ft)
- Prominence: 181 m (594 ft)
- Coordinates: 50°43′8″N 116°47′5″W

Geography
- Location: British Columbia, Canada
- District: Kootenay Land District
- Parent range: Purcell Mountains, Columbia Mountains
- Topo map: NTS 82K10 Howser Creek

Geology
- Mountain type: Granite

Climbing
- First ascent: 1930 Peter Kaufmann, Oliver Eaton Cromwell
- Easiest route: West ridge (II, 5.4)

Pigeon Spire is a peak in the Purcell Mountains of the Columbia Mountains in southeastern British Columbia, Canada. It may be one of the most climbed of the spires in The Bugaboos owing to its relatively low prominence from the Vowell Glacier and the existence of an easy route (the West Ridge; II, 5.4). It is not uncommon to have a couple dozen people on this route on a busy weekend. There are longer, harder routes on the spire's North and East faces.

== Routes ==
- West Ridge (II, 5.4)

== Gallery ==
Pigeon Spire from the Kain Route
