= Bugaboo Provincial Park =

Provincial park in British Columbia, Canada

- IUCN category II (national park)
- Location within British Columbia
- Interactive map of Bugaboo Provincial Park
- Location: Kootenay Land District, British Columbia, Canada
- Nearest city: Invermere, British Columbia
- Coordinates: 50°48′04″N 116°48′09″W
- Area: 13,646 ha (33,720 acres)
- Established: July 13, 1995
- Governing body: BC Parks
- Website: bcparks.ca/bugaboo-park/

Bugaboo Provincial Park is a provincial park in British Columbia, Canada, located in the central Purcell Mountains.

It was established in 1995 as an amalgamation of Bugaboo Glacier Park, Bugaboo Alpine Recreation Area, and various adjacent lands. The park is known primarily for the Bugaboos, a formation of mountains that attracts climbers and mountaineers, and for the Conrad Kain hut, an alpine hut managed by the Alpine Club of Canada.

== Climate ==
Bugaboo has a subarctic climate (Köppen Dfc).

Climate data for Bugaboo Creek Lodge, British Columbia (1981-2010) :1529m
Month	Jan	Feb	Mar	Apr	May	Jun	Jul	Aug	Sep	Oct	Nov	Dec	Year
Record high °C (°F)	6.7 (44.1)	10.5 (50.9)	14.5 (58.1)	21.7 (71.1)	28.0 (82.4)	27.2 (81.0)	30.6 (87.1)	30.5 (86.9)	28.0 (82.4)	23.0 (73.4)	12.8 (55.0)	10.0 (50.0)	30.6 (87.1)
Mean daily maximum °C (°F)	−5.7 (21.7)	−2.5 (27.5)	2.8 (37.0)	6.8 (44.2)	12.2 (54.0)	16.3 (61.3)	19.2 (66.6)	19.9 (67.8)	14.3 (57.7)	6.8 (44.2)	−1.9 (28.6)	−7.7 (18.1)	6.7 (44.1)
Daily mean °C (°F)	−10.1 (13.8)	−8.1 (17.4)	−3.3 (26.1)	1.1 (34.0)	5.6 (42.1)	9.5 (49.1)	11.8 (53.2)	11.8 (53.2)	7.3 (45.1)	1.7 (35.1)	−5.8 (21.6)	−11.9 (10.6)	0.8 (33.4)
Mean daily minimum °C (°F)	−14.5 (5.9)	−13.5 (7.7)	−9.4 (15.1)	−4.7 (23.5)	−1.1 (30.0)	2.7 (36.9)	4.4 (39.9)	3.8 (38.8)	0.2 (32.4)	−3.4 (25.9)	−9.6 (14.7)	−16.1 (3.0)	−5.1 (22.8)
Record low °C (°F)	−37.5 (−35.5)	−40.5 (−40.9)	−31.0 (−23.8)	−25.0 (−13.0)	−10.0 (14.0)	−5.0 (23.0)	−2.5 (27.5)	−4.5 (23.9)	−9.0 (15.8)	−22.0 (−7.6)	−37.5 (−35.5)	−39.0 (−38.2)	−40.5 (−40.9)
Average precipitation mm (inches)	108.4 (4.27)	81.6 (3.21)	63.2 (2.49)	52.4 (2.06)	52.8 (2.08)	75.0 (2.95)	74.2 (2.92)	63.7 (2.51)	51.1 (2.01)	80.4 (3.17)	116.8 (4.60)	88.4 (3.48)	908 (35.75)
Average snowfall cm (inches)	99.6 (39.2)	77.5 (30.5)	58.3 (23.0)	35.7 (14.1)	7.1 (2.8)	0.1 (0.0)	0.0 (0.0)	0.0 (0.0)	2.1 (0.8)	30.3 (11.9)	98.2 (38.7)	87.7 (34.5)	496.6 (195.5)
Source: Environment Canada
