= Scylla Mountain =

Mountain in British Columbia, Canada

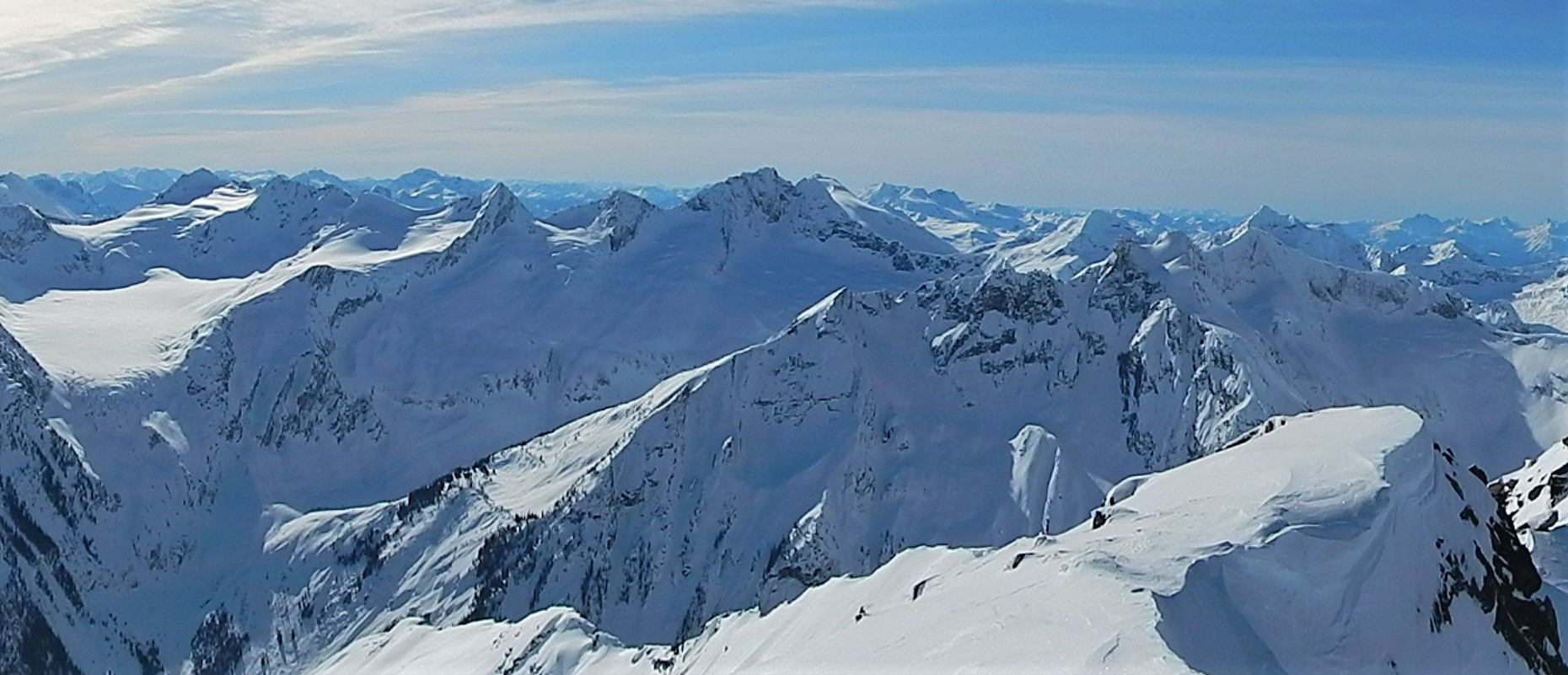
- North aspect, the highest point centered

Highest point
- Elevation: 2,920 m (9,580 ft)
- Prominence: 549 m (1,801 ft)
- Parent peak: Mount Proteus (3,198 m)
- Isolation: 5.47 km (3.40 mi)
- Listing: Mountains of British Columbia
- Coordinates: 50°54′05″N 117°24′28″W

Naming
- Etymology: Scylla

Geography
- Location within British Columbia Location within Canada
- Interactive map of Scylla Mountain
- Country: Canada
- Province: British Columbia
- District: Kootenay Land District
- Parent range: Selkirk Mountains; Battle Range
- Topo map: NTS 82K14 Westfall River

Climbing
- First ascent: August 1959

Scylla Mountain is a 2,920-metre (9,580-foot) summit in British Columbia, Canada.

== Description ==
Scylla Mountain is located in the Battle Range of the Selkirk Mountains. The remote peak is set approximately 3 km (1.9 mi) west-northwest of Wrong Peak and 7 km (4.3 mi) south of Moby Dick Mountain. Precipitation runoff from the mountain drains north to Houston Creek and south into headwaters of the Westfall River, which are both tributaries of the Duncan River. Scylla Mountain is more notable for its steep rise above local terrain than for its absolute elevation. Topographic relief is significant as the summit rises 1,400 meters (4,593 ft) above the Westfall River in 3 km (1.9 mi).

== History ==
The peak was named in 1947 by Andrew J. Kauffman II and Norman Brewster, whereas the first ascent of the summit was made in August 1959 by a Dartmouth Mountaineering Club party. The mountain's toponym was officially adopted on June 9, 1960, by the Geographical Names Board of Canada, however, the location was officially corrected on October 3, 1973. This mountain's name refers to Scylla, a metamorphic monster in Greek mythology who lives on one side of a narrow channel of water, opposite her counterpart Charybdis. The two sides of the Strait of Messina are so close that sailors attempting to avoid Charybdis would pass dangerously close to Scylla and vice versa. Scylla Mountain is situated 6 km (3.7 mi) northeast of Charybdis Mountain. Scylla is pronounced: /ˈsɪlə/ SIL-ə.

== Climate ==
Based on the Köppen climate classification, Scylla Mountain is located in a subarctic climate zone with cold, snowy winters, and mild summers. Winter temperatures can drop below −20 °C with wind chill factors below −30 °C. This climate supports the Scylla Glacier on the west slope of the peak and a small unnamed icefield on the north slope.

== Gallery ==
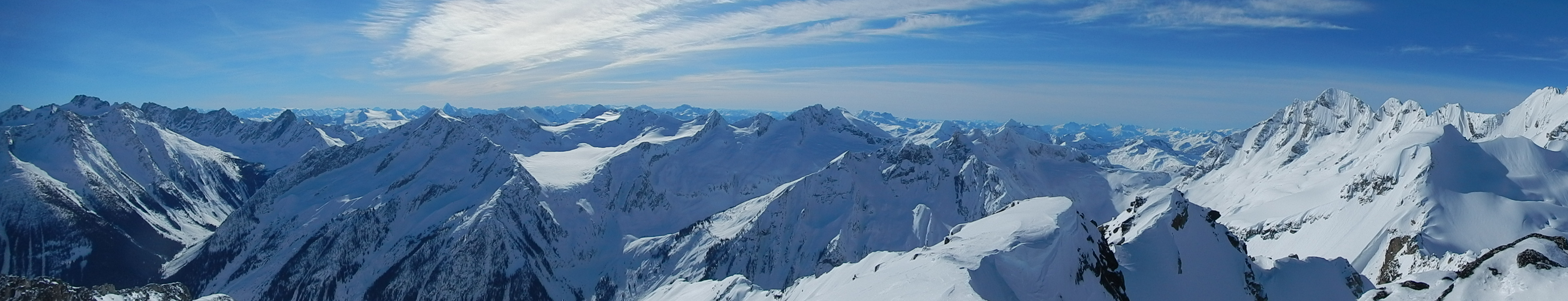
Battle Range, from summit of Typee Mountain. Scylla Mountain is centered.

== See also ==
- Geography of British Columbia
