= Outrigger Peak =

Mountain in the country of Canada

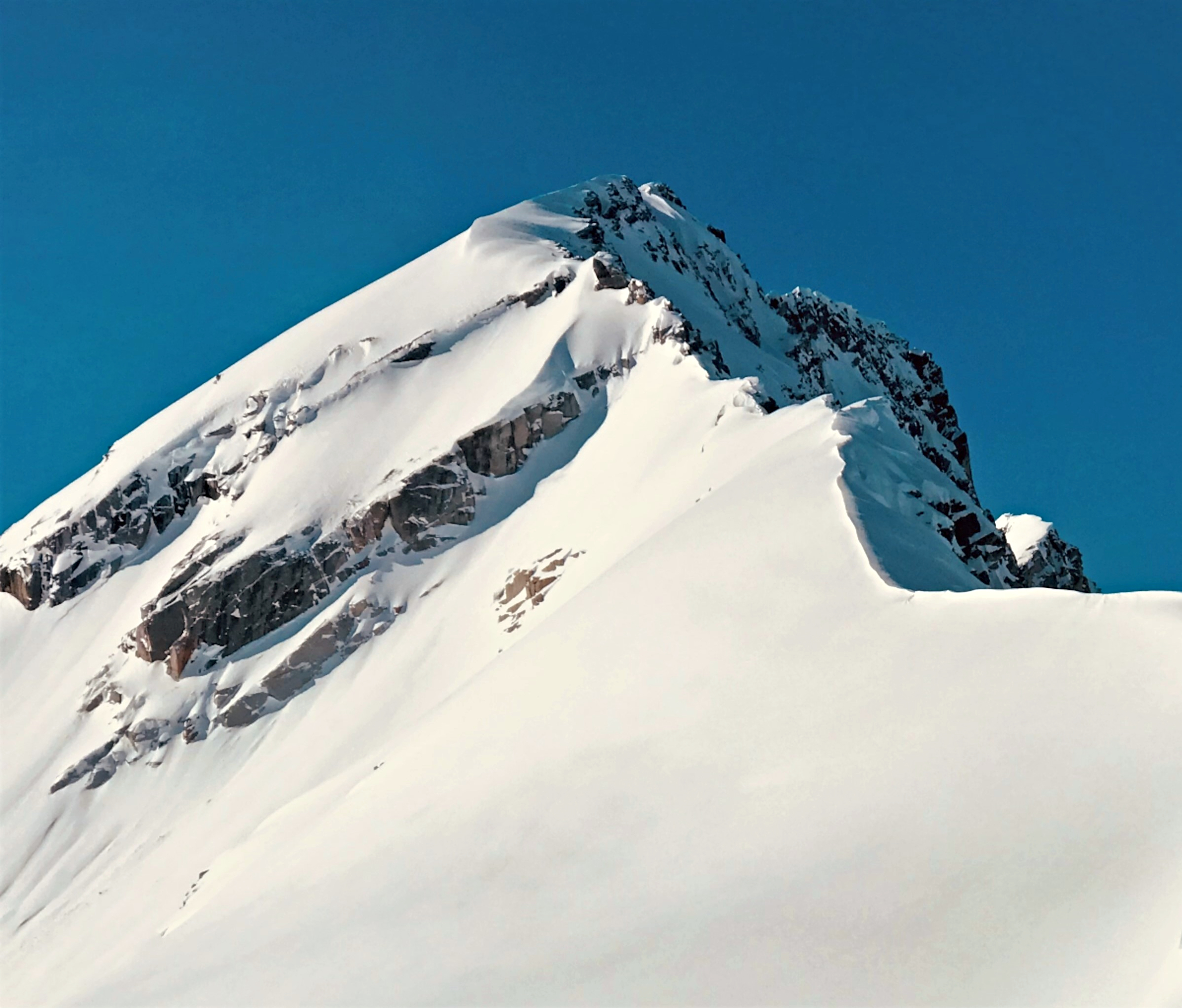
- Northeast aspect

Highest point
- Elevation: 2,850 m (9,350 ft)
- Prominence: 101 m (331 ft)
- Parent peak: Mount Proteus (3,198 m)
- Isolation: 1.074 km (0.667 mi)
- Listing: Mountains of British Columbia
- Coordinates: 50°57′35″N 117°21′47″W

Geography
- Location within British Columbia Location within Canada
- Interactive map of Outrigger Peak
- Country: Canada
- Province: British Columbia
- District: Kootenay Land District
- Parent range: Selkirk Mountains; Battle Range
- Topo map: NTS 82K14 Westfall River

Climbing
- First ascent: 1972

Outrigger Peak is a 2,850-metre (9,350-foot) mountain summit in British Columbia, Canada.

== Description ==
Outrigger Peak is a double summit located in the Battle Range of the Selkirk Mountains. The remote peak is set approximately 10 km (6.2 mi) south of Glacier National Park and 3 km (1.9 mi) east of Moby Dick Mountain. Typee Mountain is one kilometer west of Outrigger and Omoo Peak is one kilometer northeast. Precipitation runoff from the mountain drains north into the headwaters of Butters Creek and south into Houston Creek which are both tributaries of the Duncan River. Outrigger Peak is more notable for its steep rise above local terrain than for its absolute elevation. Topographic relief is significant as the summit rises 1,550 meters (5,085 ft) above Houston Creek in 3 km (1.9 mi). The first ascent of Outrigger's summit was made in 1972 by Andrew J. Kauffman II, Judge David Michael, Arnold Wexler and John Markel.

== Etymology ==
The landform's name follows the Herman Melville-associated naming theme of this area established in 1958–59 by the Sam Silverstein-Douglas Anger climbing party. Melville's novels Omoo and Typee are centered around the islands of Polynesia. An outrigger is a boat commonly used in this part of the world. The mountain's toponym was officially adopted on October 3, 1973, by the Geographical Names Board of Canada.

== Climate ==
Based on the Köppen climate classification, Outrigger Peak is located in a subarctic climate zone with cold, snowy winters, and mild summers. Winter temperatures can drop below −20 °C with wind chill factors below −30 °C. This climate supports the Pequod Glacier on the northwest slope of the peak.

== See also ==
- Geography of British Columbia
