= Mainmast Peak =

Mountain in British Columbia, Canada

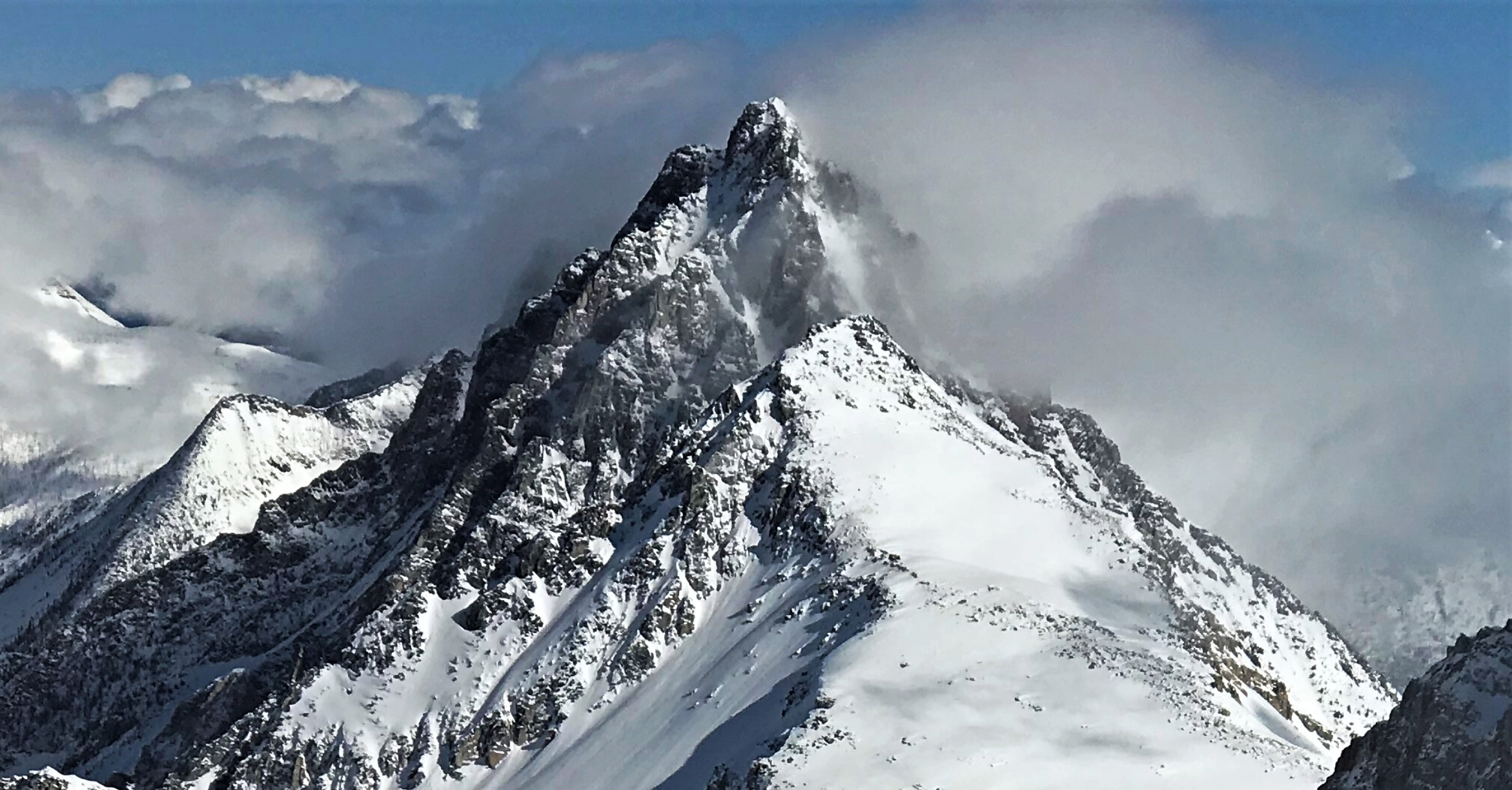
- Southwest aspect with Foremast in front

Highest point
- Elevation: 2,863 m (9,393 ft)
- Prominence: 428 m (1,404 ft)
- Parent peak: Mount Proteus (3,198 m)
- Isolation: 4.83 km (3.00 mi)
- Listing: Mountains of British Columbia
- Coordinates: 50°58′59″N 117°19′15″W

Naming
- Etymology: Main-mast

Geography
- Location within British Columbia Location within Canada
- Interactive map of Mainmast Peak
- Country: Canada
- Province: British Columbia
- District: Kootenay Land District
- Parent range: Selkirk Mountains; Battle Range
- Topo map: NTS 82K14 Westfall River

Climbing
- Easiest route: Technical climb

Mainmast Peak is a 2,863-metre (9,393-foot) mountain summit in British Columbia, Canada.

== Description ==
Mainmast Peak is located in the Battle Range of the Selkirk Mountains and it is the highest peak on Schooner Ridge. The remote peak is set immediately northeast of Foremast Peak, southwest of Mizzenmast Peak, and approximately 6 km (3.7 mi) south of Glacier National Park. Precipitation runoff from the mountain drains north into Butters Creek and south into Houston Creek which are both tributaries of the Duncan River. Mainmast Peak is more notable for its steep rise above local terrain than for its absolute elevation. Topographic relief is significant as the summit rises 1,660 meters (5,446 ft) above Houston Creek in 2.5 km (1.6 mi) and 1,200 meters (3,937 ft) above Butters Creek in 1.5 km (0.93 mi). The nearest higher neighbor is Mount Butters, 4.83 km (3.00 mi) to the west. The first ascent of Mainmast's summit was made in 1972 by Andrew J. Kauffman II, Judge David Michael, Arnold Wexler, and John Markel.

== Etymology ==
The landform was named by Andrew J. Kauffman II who imagined the peaks on Schooner Ridge as resembling sails on a four-masted ship. The name follows the nautical naming theme for individual peaks on Schooner Ridge. The mountain's toponym was officially adopted on October 3, 1973, by the Geographical Names Board of Canada.

== Climate ==
Based on the Köppen climate classification, Mainmast Peak is located in a subarctic climate zone with cold, snowy winters, and mild summers. Winter temperatures can drop below −20 °C with wind chill factors below −30 °C.

== See also ==
- Geography of British Columbia
