= Mount Butters (British Columbia) =

Mountain in Western Canada

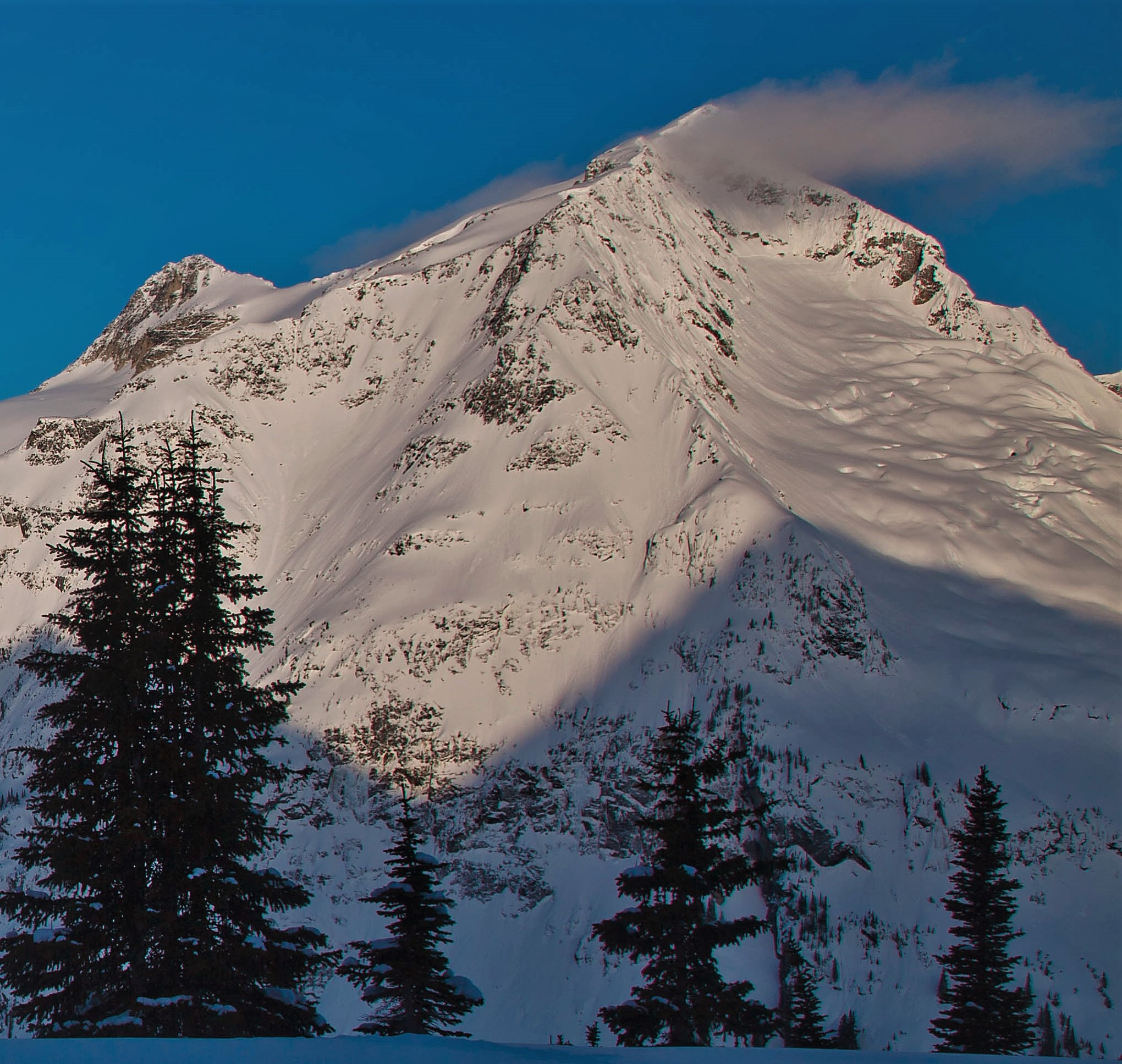
- East aspect

Highest point
- Elevation: 3,141 m (10,305 ft)
- Prominence: 673 m (2,208 ft)
- Parent peak: Mount Proteus (3,198 m)
- Isolation: 3.65 km (2.27 mi)
- Listing: Mountains of British Columbia
- Coordinates: 50°59′34″N 117°23′20″W

Naming
- Etymology: Frederic King Butters

Geography
- Location within British Columbia Location within Canada
- Interactive map of Mount Butters
- Country: Canada
- Province: British Columbia
- District: Kootenay Land District
- Parent range: Selkirk Mountains; Battle Range
- Topo map: NTS 82K14 Westfall River

Geology
- Mountain type: Fault block

Climbing
- First ascent: 1914

Mount Butters is a 3,141-metre (10,305-foot) mountain summit in British Columbia, Canada.

== Description ==
Mount Butters is located in the Battle Range of the Selkirk Mountains. The remote peak is set approximately 6 km (3.7 mi) south of Glacier National Park. Precipitation runoff from the mountain drains north into Battle Brook which is a tributary of the Incomappleux River, and south into Butters Creek which is a tributary of the Duncan River. Mount Butters is more notable for its steep rise above local terrain than for its absolute elevation. Topographic relief is significant as the summit rises 1,400 meters (4,593 ft) above Butters Creek in 2 km (1.2 mi), and 2,200 meters (7,218 ft) above Battle Brook valley in 3 km (1.9 mi).

== History ==
The mountain is named after Professor Frederic King Butters (1878–1945) who climbed in this area from 1904–1924. He accomplished more than 50 major climbs in the Selkirk Mountains. He was a Fellow of the Royal Geographical Society, a member of the Alpine Club of Canada, the American Alpine Club, and of the American Geographical Society. The mountain's toponym was officially adopted on July 9, 1946, by the Geographical Names Board of Canada.

The first ascent of the summit was made in 1914 by Frederic Butters, Edward W. D. Holway and Andrew James Gilmour.

== Climate ==
Based on the Köppen climate classification, Mount Butters is located in a subarctic climate zone with cold, snowy winters and mild summers. Winter temperatures can drop below −20 °C with wind chill factors below −30 °C. This climate supports unnamed glaciers on the slopes and cirques surrounding the peak.

== Gallery ==
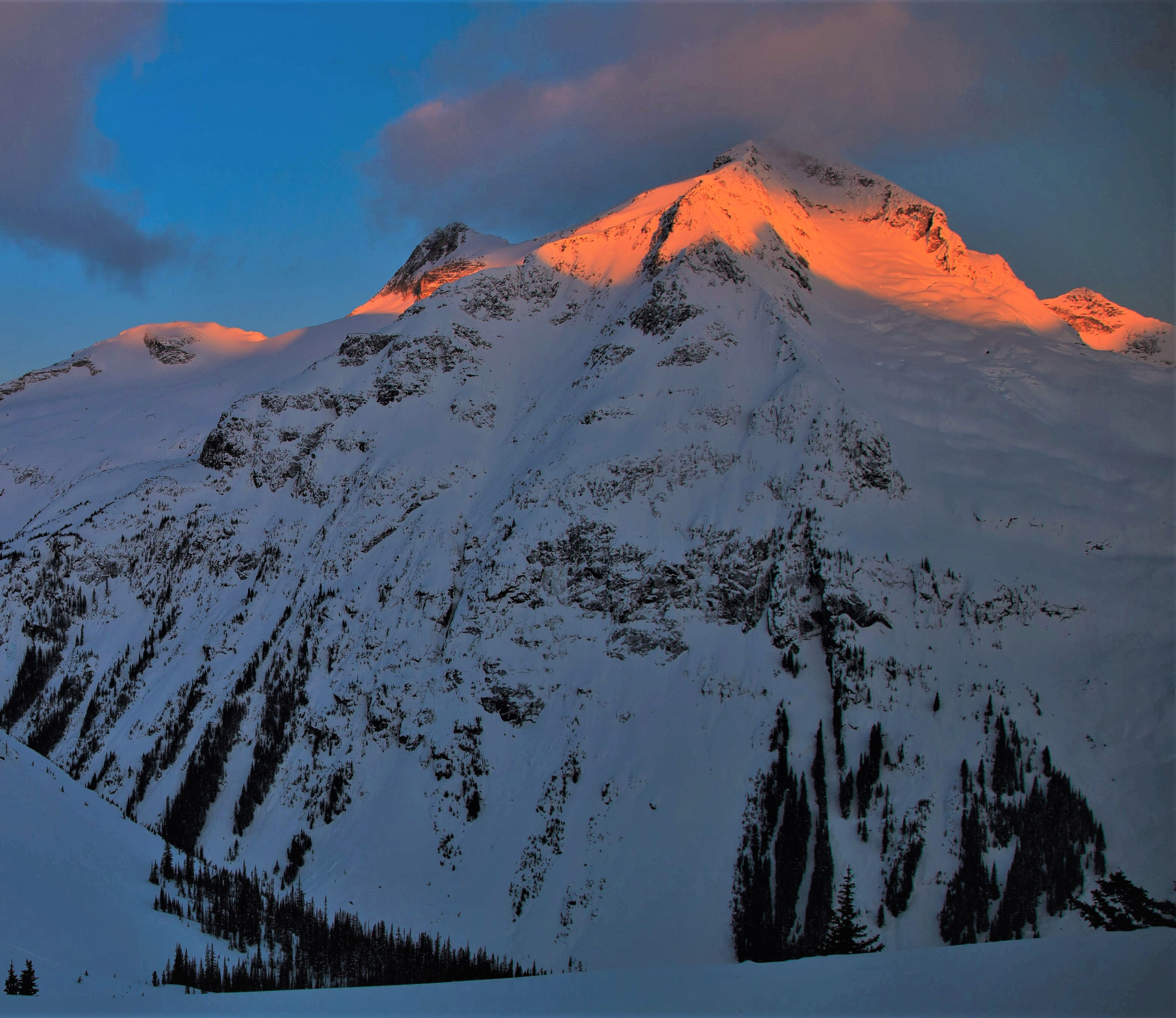
Mount Butters at dawn in winter

== See also ==
- Geography of British Columbia
- Beaver Mountain
