= Wrong Peak =

Mountain in British Columbia, Canada

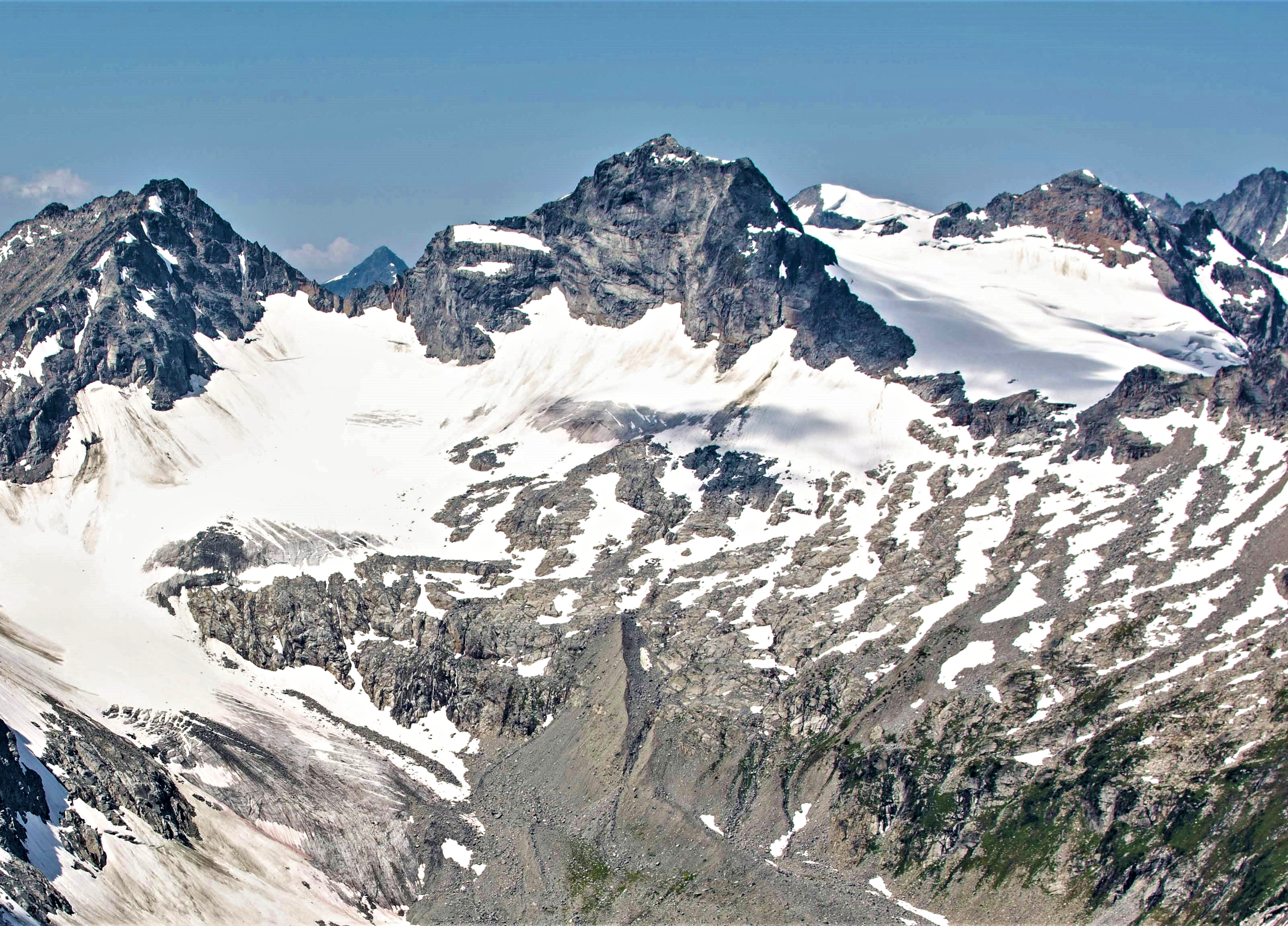
- East aspect, centered (Erratum Peak to left)

Highest point
- Elevation: 2,869 m (9,413 ft)
- Prominence: 207 m (679 ft)
- Parent peak: Scylla Mountain (2,920 m)
- Isolation: 2.9 km (1.8 mi)
- Listing: Mountains of British Columbia
- Coordinates: 50°53′35″N 117°22′04″W

Geography
- Location within British Columbia Location within Canada
- Interactive map of Wrong Peak
- Country: Canada
- Province: British Columbia
- District: Kootenay Land District
- Parent range: Selkirk Mountains; Battle Range
- Topo map: NTS 82K14 Westfall River

Climbing
- First ascent: July 1959

Wrong Peak is a 2,869-metre (9,413-foot) summit in British Columbia, Canada.

== Description ==
Wrong Peak is located in the Battle Range of the Selkirk Mountains. The remote peak is set approximately 8 km (5.0 mi) southwest of Nautilus Mountain and the nearest higher neighbor is Scylla Mountain, 2.9 km (1.8 mi) to the west-northwest. Precipitation runoff from the mountain drains north to Houston Creek and south to Westfall River, which are both tributaries of the Duncan River. Wrong Peak is more notable for its steep rise above local terrain than for its absolute elevation. Topographic relief is significant as the summit rises 1,400 meters (4,593 ft) above the Westfall River in 5 km (3.1 mi).

== History ==
The first ascent of the summit was made in 1959 by Samuel Silverstein and party.

The peak was named in 1962 in association with the Wrong Glacier. The glacier is so named because a food cache was mistakenly air dropped here instead of the intended destination, Houston Glacier, which is five kilometers further northwest. The mountain's toponym was officially adopted on September 14, 1967, by the Geographical Names Board of Canada.

== Climate ==
Based on the Köppen climate classification, Wrong Peak is located in a subarctic climate zone with cold, snowy winters, and mild summers. Winter temperatures can drop below −20 °C with wind chill factors below −30 °C. This climate supports the Wrong Glacier on the north slope of the peak and a small unnamed glacier on the east slope.

== Gallery ==
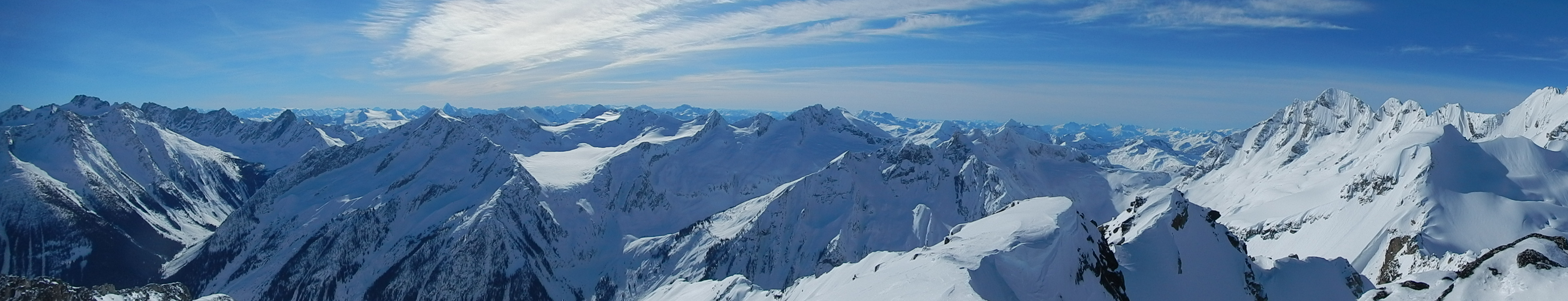
Battle Range, from summit of Typee Mountain. Wrong Peak is left of center.

== See also ==
- Geography of British Columbia
