= Nautilus Mountain =

Mountain in British Columbia, Canada

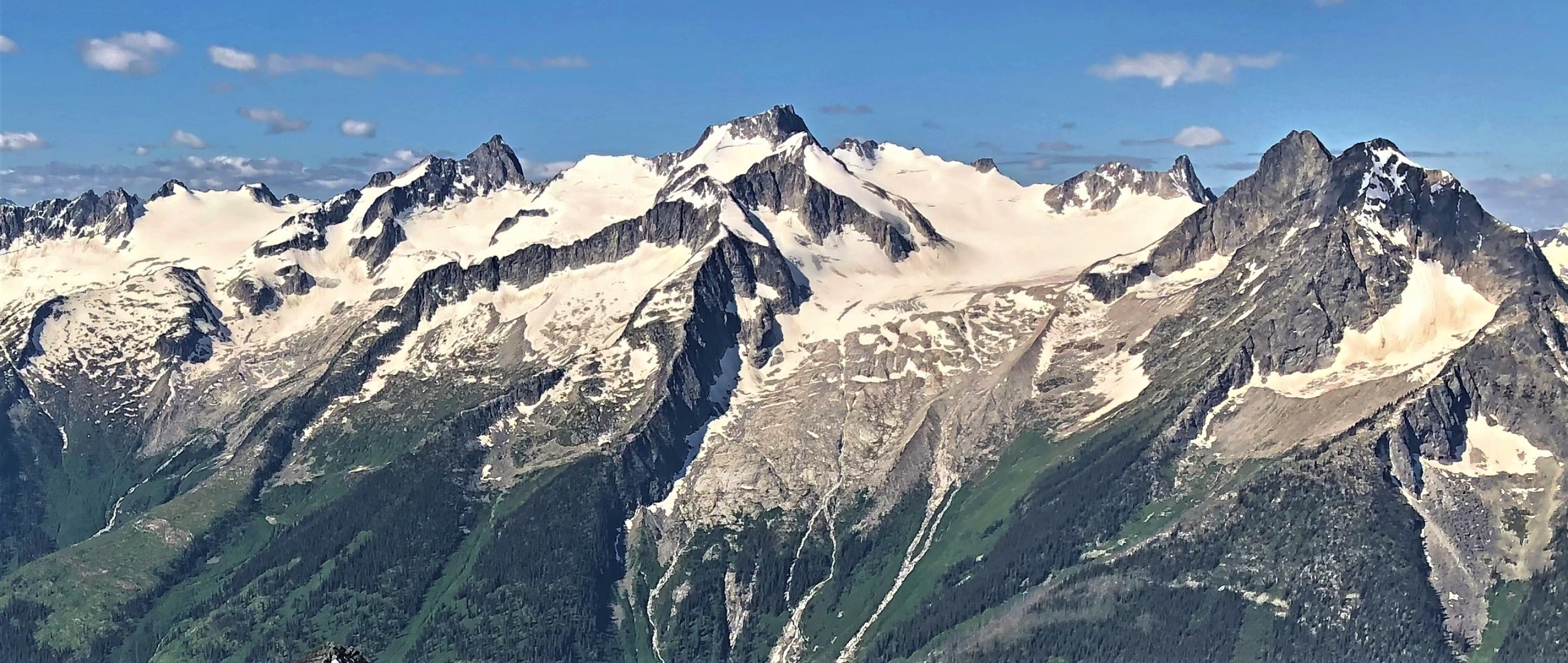
- Northeast aspect, centered at top (Mount Nemo to right)

Highest point
- Elevation: 3,130 m (10,270 ft)
- Prominence: 900 m (2,953 ft)
- Parent peak: Mount Dawson (3,377 m)
- Isolation: 10.62 km (6.60 mi)
- Listing: Mountains of British Columbia
- Coordinates: 50°55′13″N 117°16′13″W

Naming
- Etymology: Nautilus (fictional submarine)

Geography
- Location within British Columbia Location within Canada
- Interactive map of Nautilus Mountain
- Country: Canada
- Province: British Columbia
- District: Kootenay Land District
- Parent range: Selkirk Mountains; Battle Range
- Topo map: NTS 82K14 Westfall River

Climbing
- First ascent: July 1959

Nautilus Mountain is a 3,130-metre (10,270-foot) summit in British Columbia, Canada.

== Description ==
Nautilus Mountain is located in the Battle Range of the Selkirk Mountains. The remote peak is set approximately 14 km (8.7 mi) south of Glacier National Park and the nearest higher peak is Moby Dick Mountain, 10.62 km (6.60 mi) to the west-northwest. Precipitation runoff from the mountain drains into tributaries of the Duncan River. Nautilus Mountain is notable for its steep rise above local terrain and for its absolute elevation. Topographic relief is significant as the summit rises 2,100 meters (6,890 ft) above the Duncan River in 5 km (3.1 mi).

== History ==
The landform is named for the Nautilus, a fictional submarine belonging to Captain Nemo in Jules Verne's 1870 novel Twenty Thousand Leagues Under the Seas. The peak is named in association with nearby Mount Nemo, which in turn was named by Sterling B. Hendricks in 1947. The mountain's toponym was officially adopted on November 1, 1963, by the Geographical Names Board of Canada.

The first ascent of the summit was made in 1959 by Samuel Silverstein and party.

== Climate ==
Based on the Köppen climate classification, Nautilus Mountain is located in a subarctic climate zone with cold, snowy winters, and mild summers. Winter temperatures can drop below −20 °C with wind chill factors below −30 °C. This climate supports the Nemo Glacier on the north slope of the peak and an unnamed icefield on the east slope.

== Gallery ==
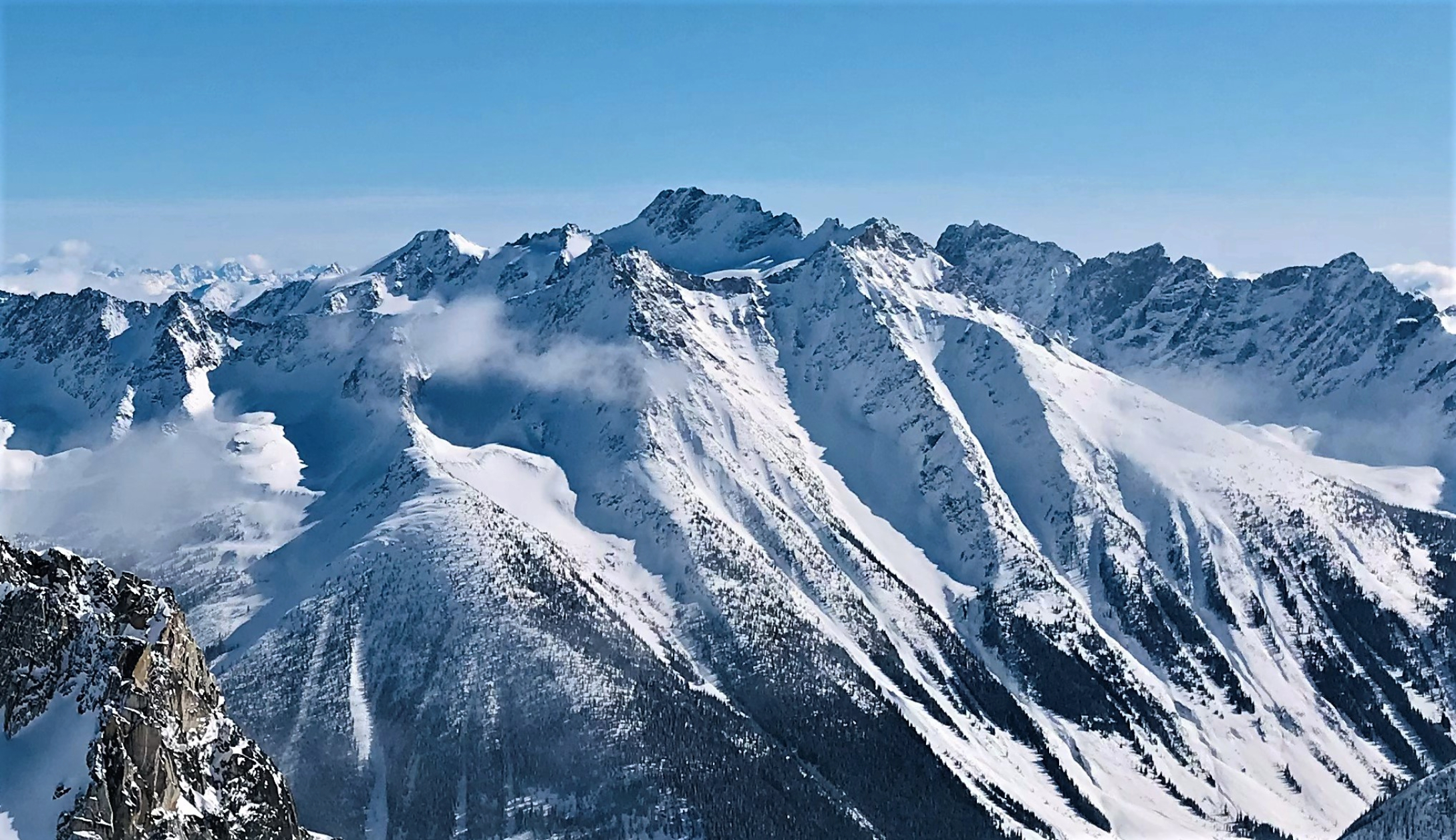
West aspect of Nautilus (highest point, centered)

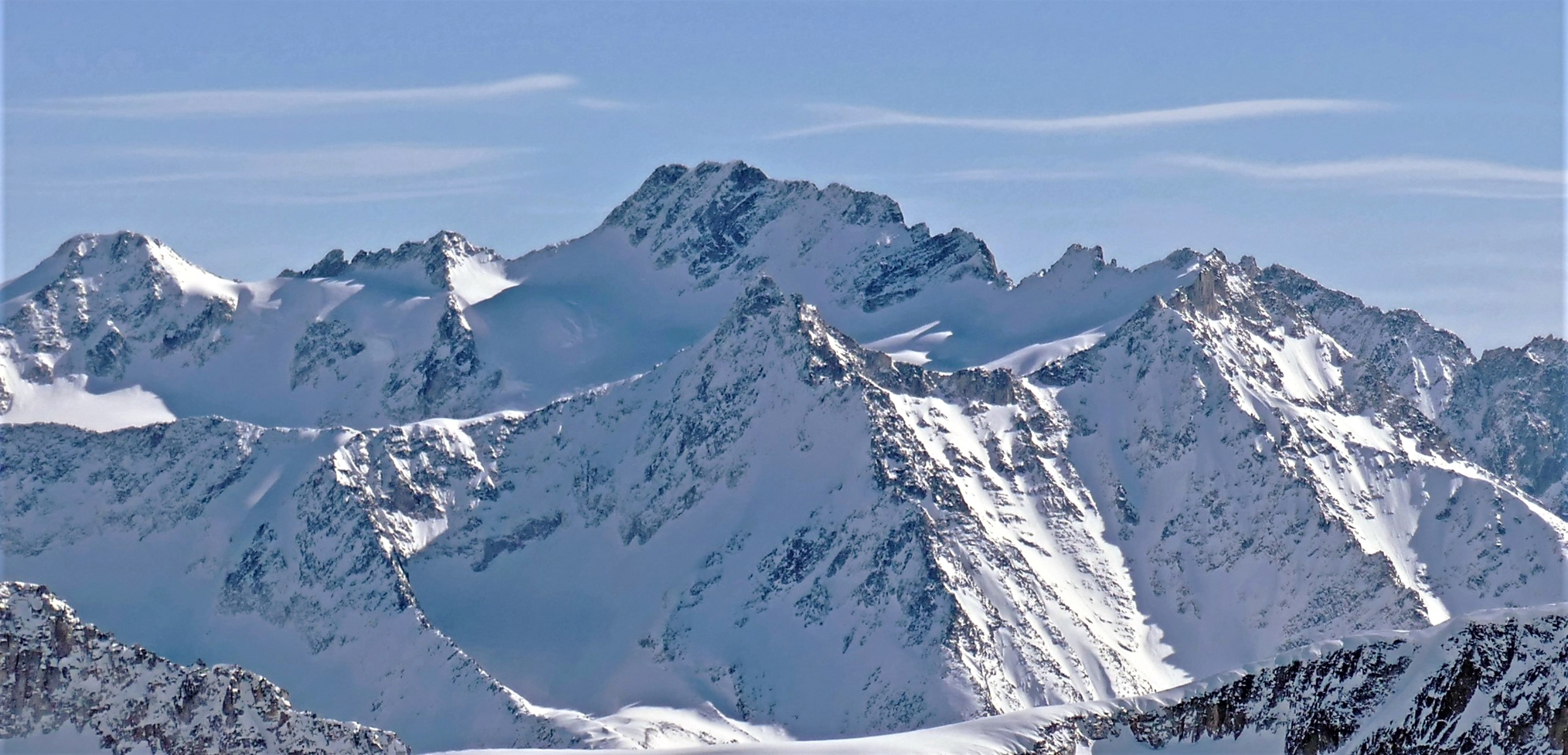
West aspect

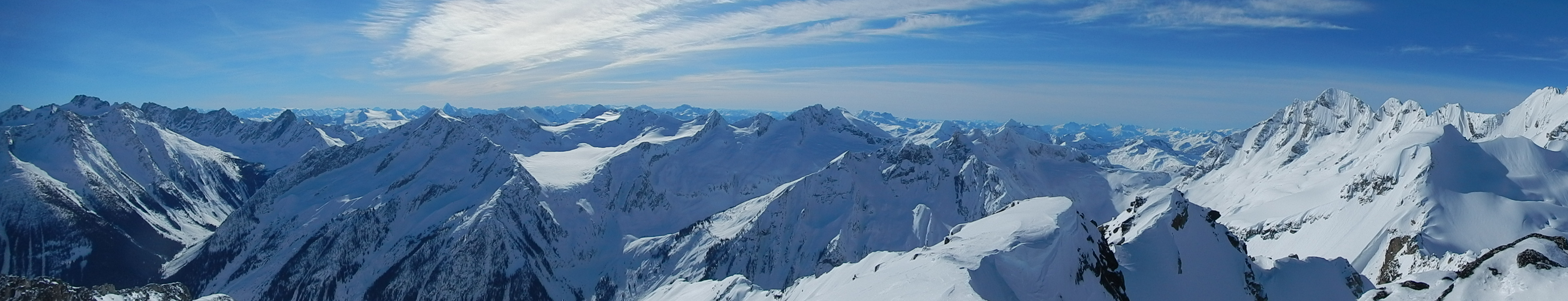
Battle Range, from summit of Typee Mountain. Nautilus Mountain at upper left corner.

== See also ==
- Geography of British Columbia
