= Pequod Mountain =

Mountain in the country of Canada

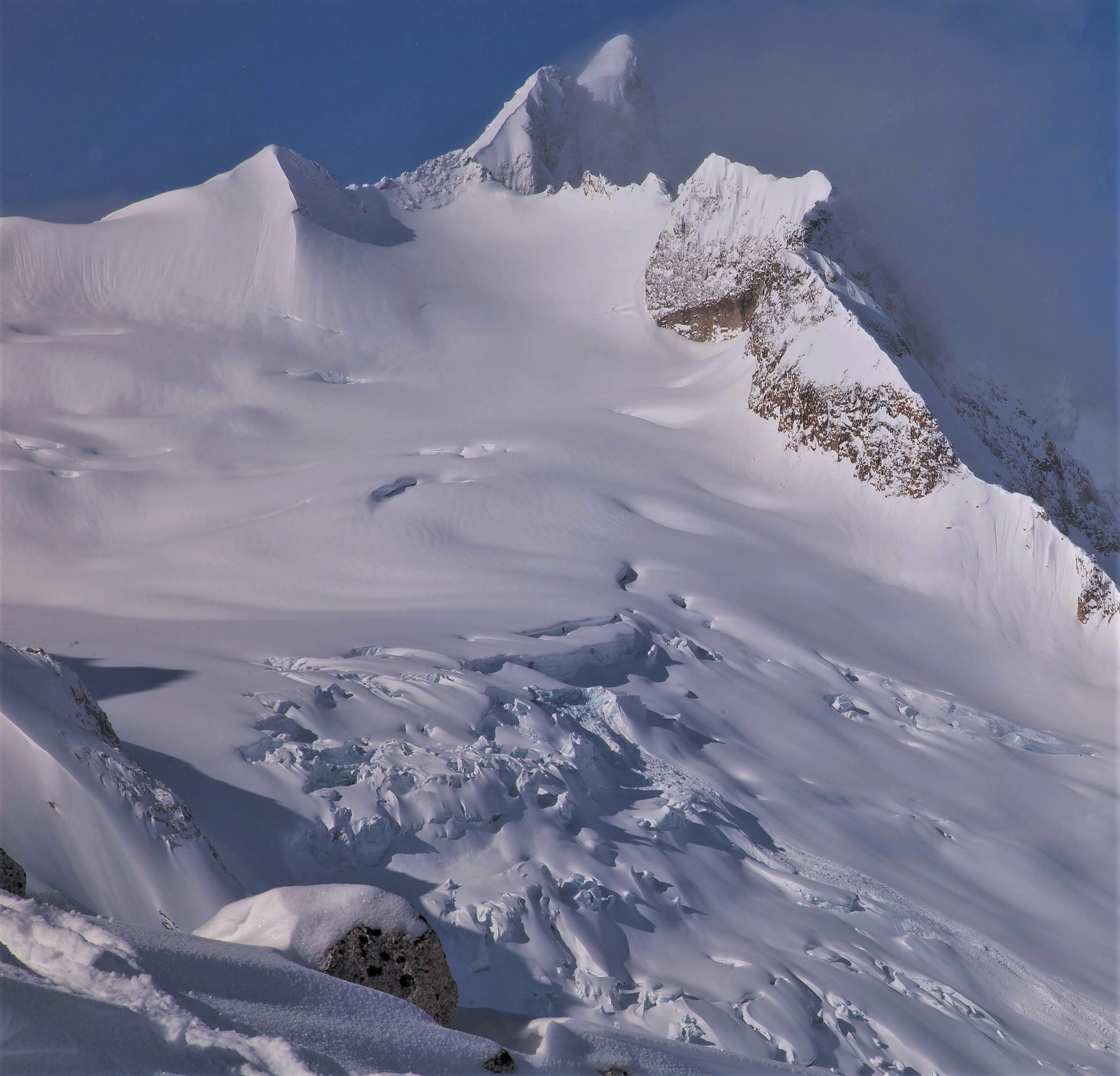
- East aspect in winter

Highest point
- Elevation: 2,979 m (9,774 ft)
- Prominence: 67 m (220 ft)
- Parent peak: Mount Proteus (3,198 m)
- Isolation: 0.263 km (0.163 mi)
- Listing: Mountains of British Columbia
- Coordinates: 50°57′43″N 117°23′56″W

Naming
- Etymology: Pequod

Geography
- Location within British Columbia Location within Canada
- Interactive map of Pequod Mountain
- Country: Canada
- Province: British Columbia
- District: Kootenay Land District
- Parent range: Selkirk Mountains; Battle Range
- Topo map: NTS 82K14 Westfall River

Climbing
- First ascent: 1958

Pequod Mountain is a 2,979-metre (9,774-foot) summit in British Columbia, Canada.

== Description ==
Pequod Mountain is located 0.5 km (0.31 mi) east of Moby Dick Mountain in the Battle Range of the Selkirk Mountains. The remote peak is set approximately 10 km (6.2 mi) south of Glacier National Park. Precipitation runoff from the mountain drains north into headwaters of Butters Creek and south into Houston Creek which are both tributaries of the Duncan River. Pequod Mountain is more notable for its steep rise above local terrain than for its absolute elevation. Topographic relief is significant as the summit rises 1,500 meters (4,921 ft) above Houston Creek in 3 km (1.9 mi). The first ascent of the summit was made in 1958 by Douglas Anger, Bryan Mitchener and Daniel Neifert.

== Etymology ==
The landform is named after the Pequod, which was the whaling ship of Herman Melville's novel Moby-Dick that was published in 1851. In turn, the ship was named for the Algonquian-speaking Pequot tribe of Native Americans. The name was submitted in 1960 by mountaineer Sam Silverstein of the Alpine Club of Canada and follows the Herman Melville-associated naming theme of the area established in 1958–59 by the Sam Silverstein-Douglas Anger climbing party. The mountain's toponym was officially adopted on November 1, 1963, by the Geographical Names Board of Canada.

== Climate ==
Based on the Köppen climate classification, Pequod Mountain is located in a subarctic climate zone with cold, snowy winters, and mild summers. Winter temperatures can drop below −20 °C with wind chill factors below −30 °C. This climate supports the Pequod Glacier on the east slope of the peak, the Moby Dick Glacier on the south slope, and an unnamed glacier on the north slope.

== Gallery ==
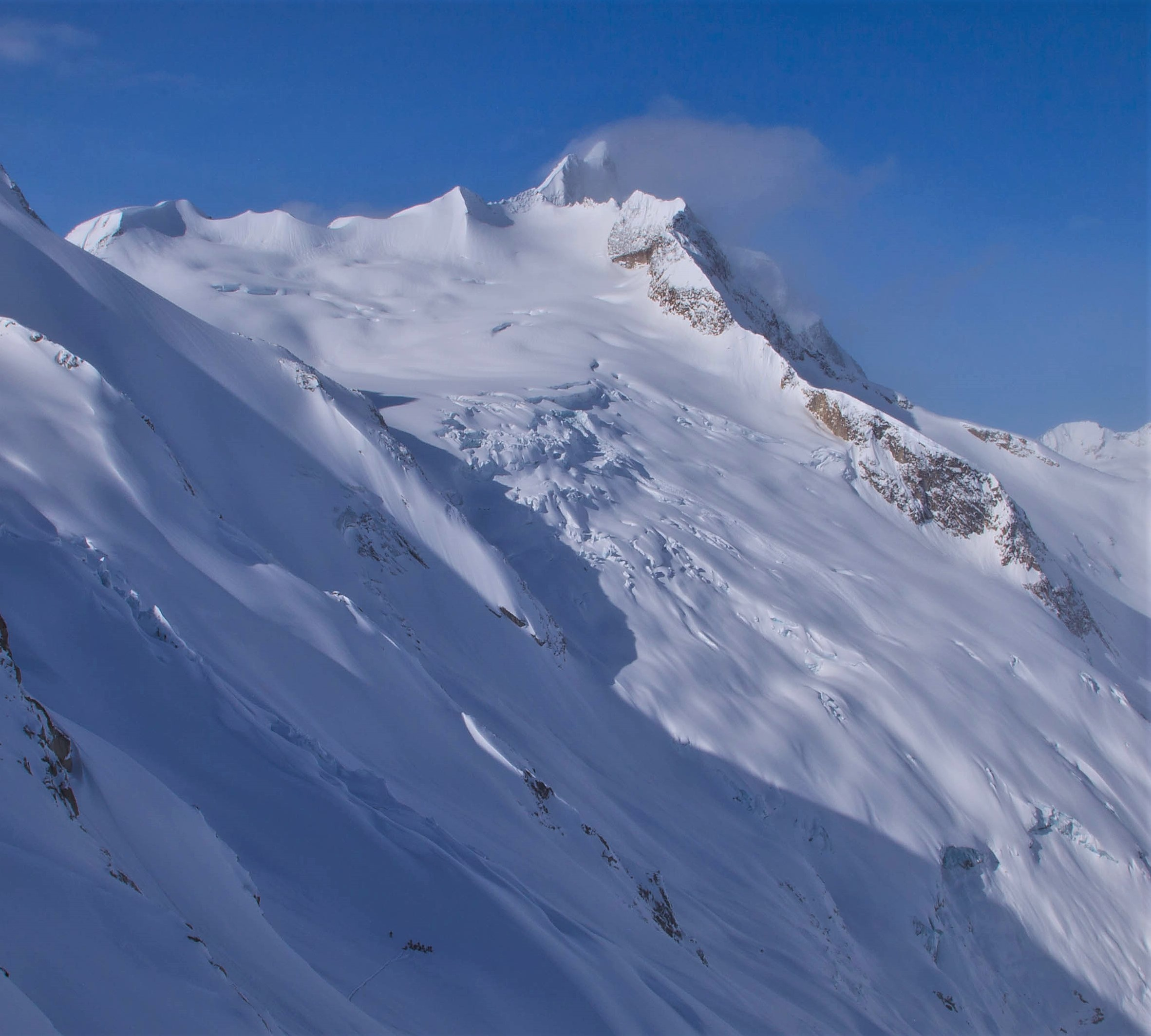
East aspect of Pequod Mountain and Pequod Glacier, with the top of Moby Dick Mountain appearing in cloud behind Pequod.

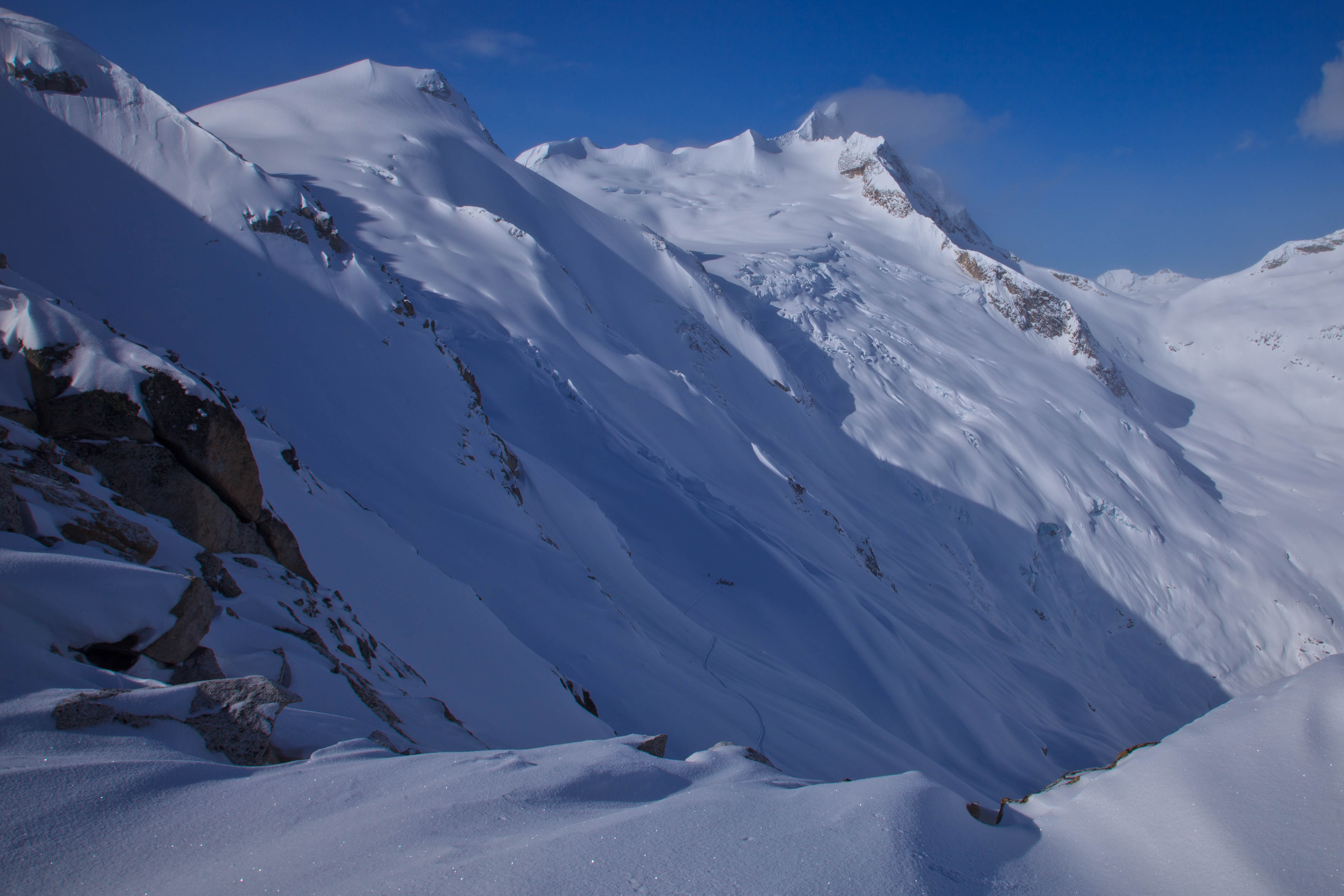
Typee Mountain and Pequod Mountain

== See also ==
- Geography of British Columbia
