= Foremast Peak =

Mountain in the country of Canada

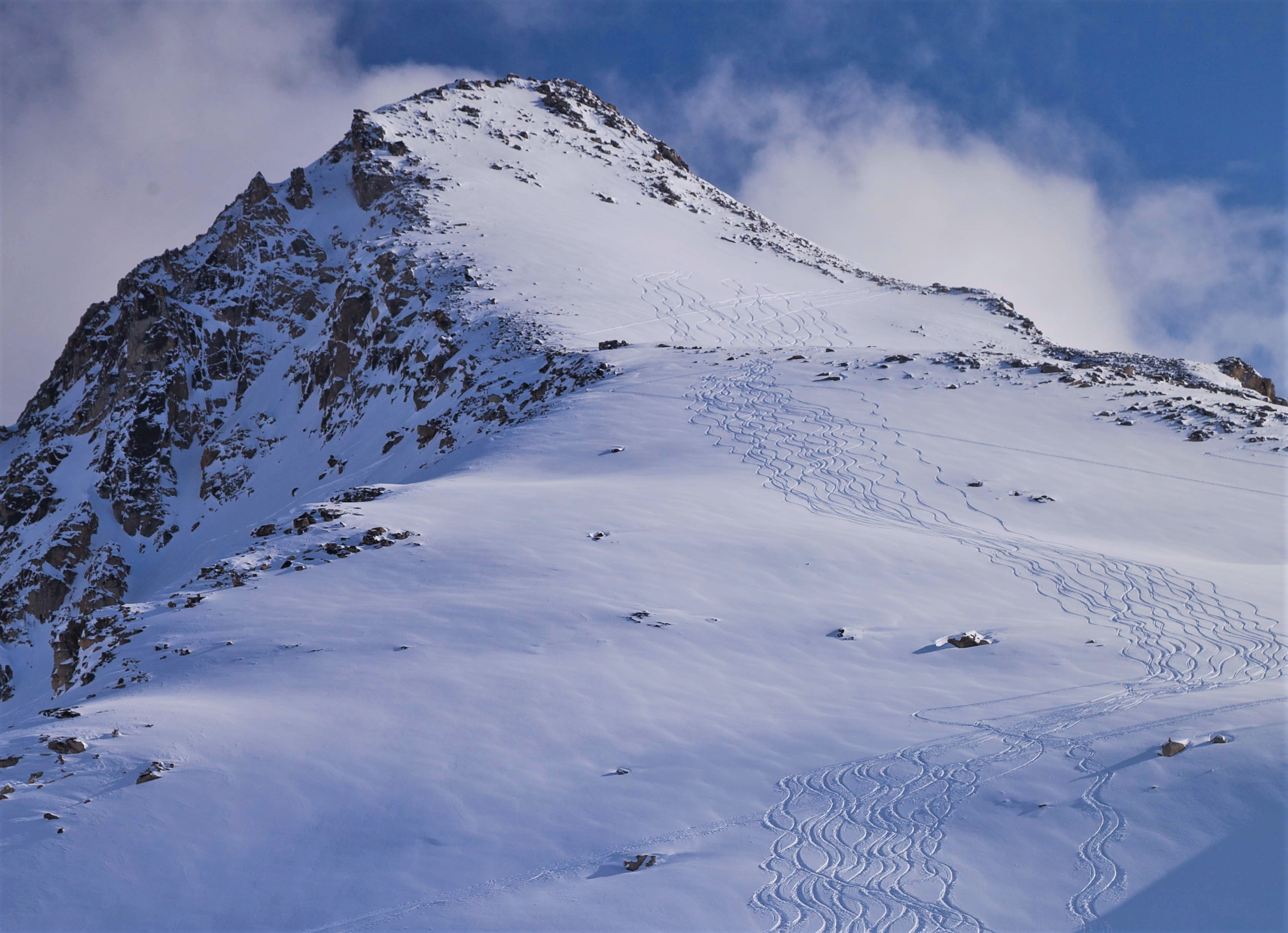
- Southwest aspect in winter

Highest point
- Elevation: 2,697 m (8,848 ft)
- Parent peak: Mainmast Peak
- Isolation: 3.84 km (2.39 mi)
- Listing: Mountains of British Columbia
- Coordinates: 50°58′40″N 117°19′55″W

Naming
- Etymology: Fore-mast

Geography
- Location within British Columbia Location within Canada
- Interactive map of Foremast Peak
- Country: Canada
- Province: British Columbia
- District: Kootenay Land District
- Parent range: Selkirk Mountains; Battle Range
- Topo map: NTS 82K14 Westfall River

Climbing
- Easiest route: Scrambling

Foremast Peak is a 2,697-metre (8,848-foot) mountain summit in British Columbia, Canada.

== Description ==
Foremast Peak is located on Schooner Ridge in the Battle Range of the Selkirk Mountains. The remote peak is set immediately northeast of Schooner Pass, southwest of Mainmast Peak, and approximately 7 km (4.3 mi) south of Glacier National Park. Precipitation runoff from the mountain drains north into Butters Creek and south into Houston Creek which are both tributaries of the Duncan River. Foremast Peak is more notable for its steep rise above local terrain than for its absolute elevation. Topographic relief is significant as the summit rises 1,500 meters (4,921 ft) above Houston Creek in 2.5 km (1.6 mi).

== Etymology ==
The landform was named by Andrew J. Kauffman II who imagined the peaks on Schooner Ridge as resembling sails on a four-masted ship. The name was submitted in August 1972 by William Lowell Putnam III of the Harvard Mountaineering Club and follows the nautical naming theme for individual peaks on Schooner Ridge. The mountain's toponym was officially adopted on October 3, 1973, by the Geographical Names Board of Canada.

== Climate ==
Based on the Köppen climate classification, Foremast Peak is located in a subarctic climate zone with cold, snowy winters, and mild summers. Winter temperatures can drop below −20 °C with wind chill factors below −30 °C.

== See also ==
- Geography of British Columbia
- Omoo Peak
