= Mount Nemo (British Columbia) =

Mountain in British Columbia, Canada

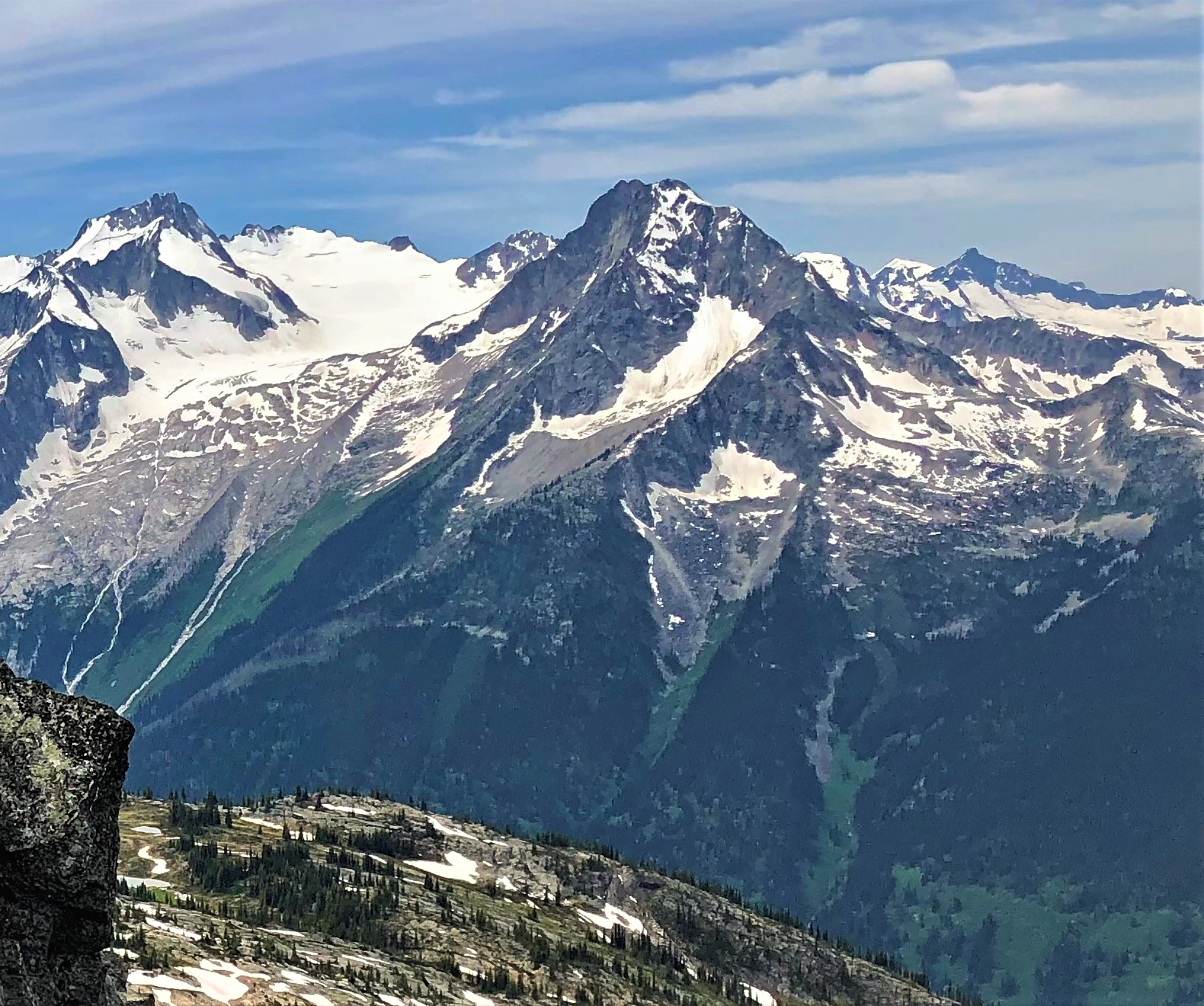
- Northeast aspect

Highest point
- Elevation: 2,901 m (9,518 ft)
- Prominence: 137 m (449 ft)
- Parent peak: Evening Mountain (2,941 m)
- Isolation: 0.72 km (0.45 mi)
- Listing: Mountains of British Columbia
- Coordinates: 50°56′54″N 117°15′11″W

Naming
- Etymology: Captain Nemo

Geography
- Location within British Columbia Location within Canada
- Country: Canada
- Province: British Columbia
- District: Kootenay Land District
- Parent range: Selkirk Mountains; Battle Range
- Topo map: NTS 82K14 Westfall River

Climbing
- First ascent: July 1959

Mount Nemo is a 2,901-metre (9,518-foot) summit in British Columbia, Canada.

== Description ==
Mount Nemo is located in the Battle Range of the Selkirk Mountains. The remote peak is set approximately 11 km (6.8 mi) south of Glacier National Park and 3 km (1.9 mi) north of Nautilus Mountain. Precipitation runoff from Nemo drains into tributaries of the Duncan River. Mount Nemo is more notable for its steep rise above local terrain than for its absolute elevation. Topographic relief is significant as the summit rises 1,800 meters (5,905 ft) above the Duncan River in 3 km (1.9 mi).

== History ==
The mountain was named by Sterling B. Hendricks in 1947 for Captain Nemo, the fictional character in Jules Verne's 1870 novel Twenty Thousand Leagues Under the Seas. The landform's toponym was officially adopted on November 1, 1963, by the Geographical Names Board of Canada.

The first ascent of the summit was made on July 18, 1959, by Samuel Silverstein, Douglas Anger and Fenwick Riley.

== Climate ==
Based on the Köppen climate classification, Mount Nemo is located in a subarctic climate zone with cold, snowy winters, and mild summers. Winter temperatures can drop below −20 °C with wind chill factors below −30 °C. This climate supports the Nemo Glacier south of the peak.

== See also ==
- Geography of British Columbia
