= Omoo Peak =

Mountain in British Columbia, Canada

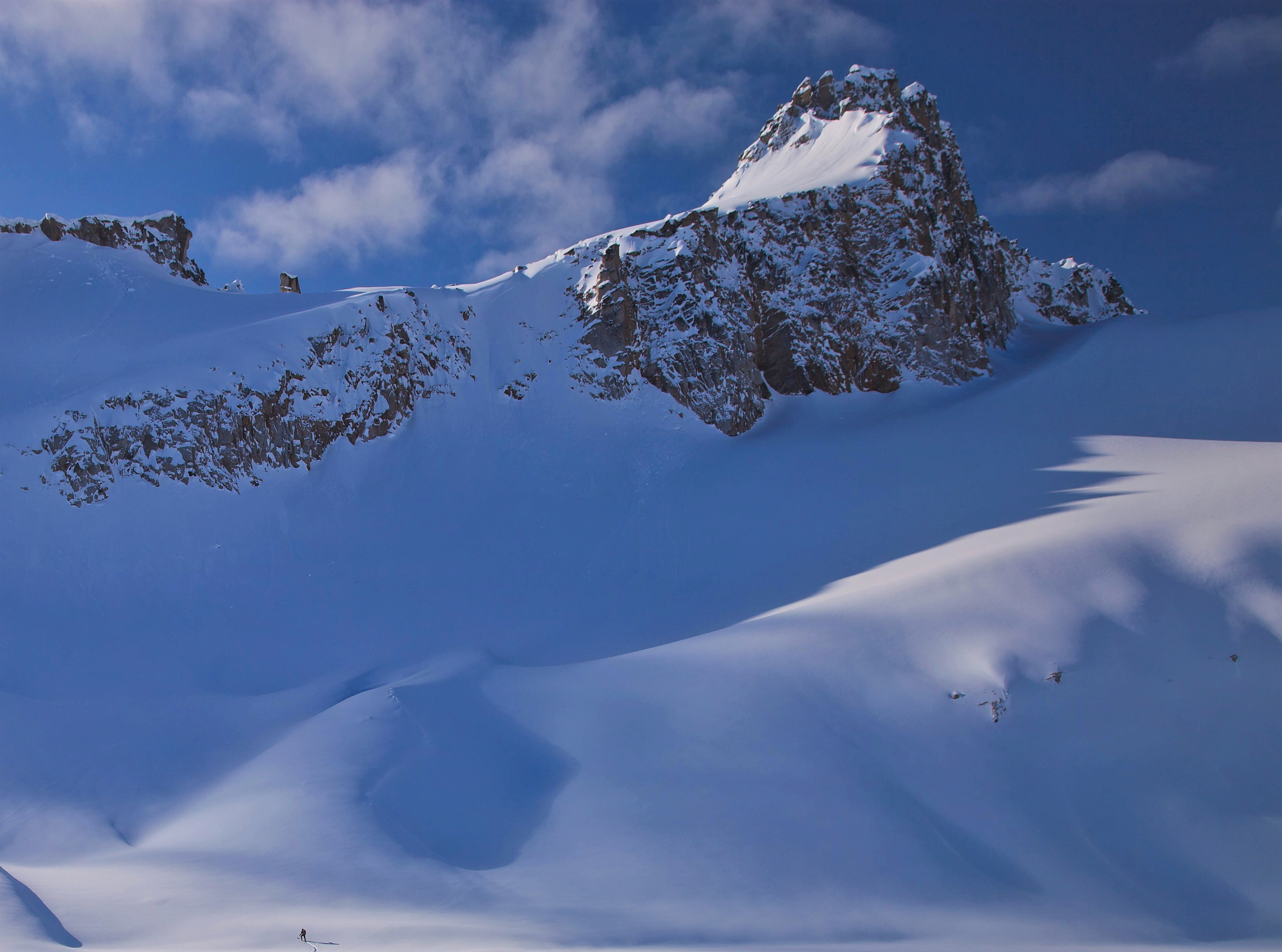
- North aspect in winter

Highest point
- Elevation: 2,674 m (8,773 ft)
- Listing: Mountains of British Columbia
- Coordinates: 50°57′58″N 117°20′59″W

Naming
- Etymology: Omoo

Geography
- Location within British Columbia Location within Canada
- Interactive map of Omoo Peak
- Country: Canada
- Province: British Columbia
- District: Kootenay Land District
- Parent range: Selkirk Mountains; Battle Range
- Topo map: NTS 82K14 Westfall River

Climbing
- First ascent: 1972 David Michael, Donald Daem

Omoo Peak is a 2,674-metre (8,773-foot) mountain summit in British Columbia, Canada.

== Description ==
Omoo Peak is located in the Battle Range of the Selkirk Mountains. The remote peak is set immediately west of Schooner Pass and approximately 8 km (5.0 mi) south of Glacier National Park. Precipitation runoff from the mountain drains north into Butters Creek and south into Houston Creek which are both tributaries of the Duncan River. Omoo Peak is more notable for its steep rise above local terrain than for its absolute elevation. Topographic relief is significant as the summit rises 1,450 m (4,760 ft) above Houston Creek in 2.5 km (1.6 mi).

== Etymology ==
The landform is named after Omoo, which was a Herman Melville novel published in 1847. In the novel, "Omoo" was a Tahitian native whose name meant "a person who wanders," and is from the dialect of the Marquesas Islands in French Polynesia in the South Pacific Ocean which is the setting for the book. The name was submitted by author/mountaineer Robert Kruszyna in 1972 and follows the Herman Melville-associated naming theme of the area established in 1958–59 by the Sam Silverstein-Douglas Anger climbing party. The mountain's toponym was officially adopted on October 3, 1973, by the Geographical Names Board of Canada.

== Climate ==
Based on the Köppen climate classification, Omoo Peak is located in a subarctic climate zone with cold, snowy winters, and mild summers. Winter temperatures can drop below −20 °C with wind chill factors below −30 °C. This climate supports a small unnamed glacier on the north slope of the peak.

== Gallery ==
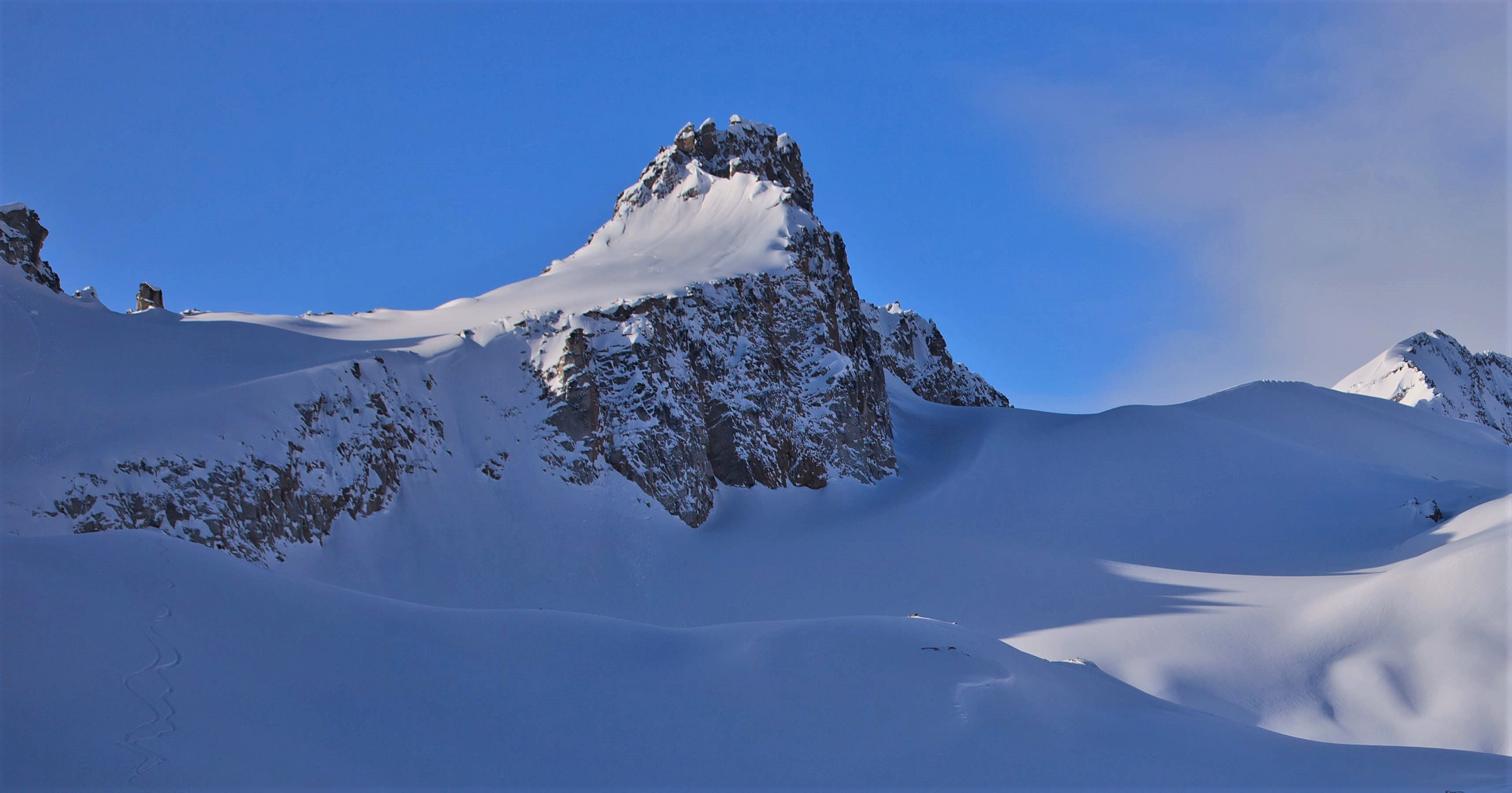
North aspect

== See also ==
- Geography of British Columbia
- Foremast Peak
- Outrigger Peak
