= Mount Duncan =

Mountain in British Columbia, Canada

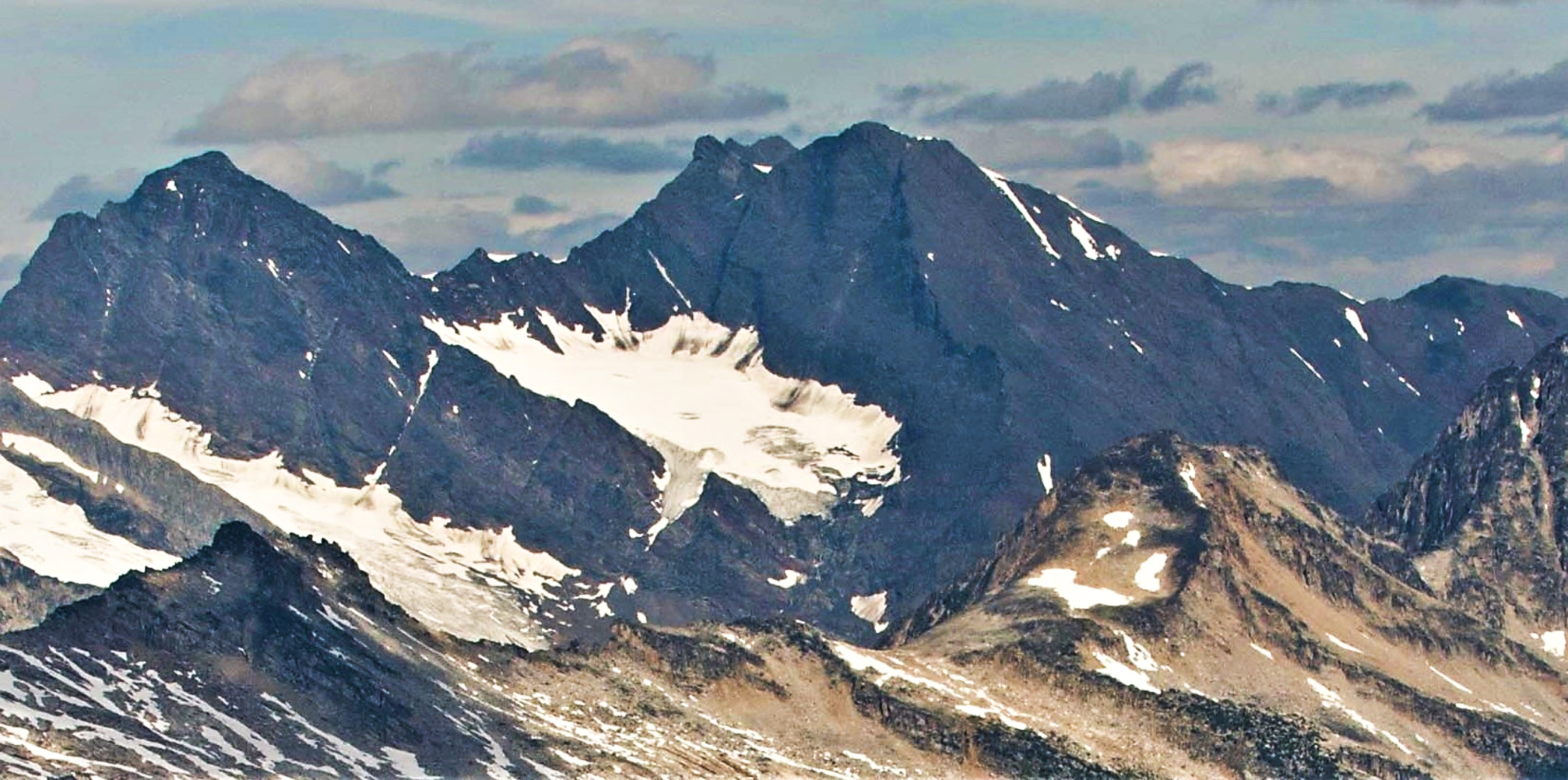
- South aspect, centered (Beaver Mountain to left)

Highest point
- Elevation: 3,202 m (10,505 ft)
- Prominence: 242 m (794 ft)
- Parent peak: Beaver Mountain (3,212 m)
- Isolation: 1.17 km (0.73 mi)
- Listing: Mountains of British Columbia
- Coordinates: 51°02′26″N 117°18′58″W

Naming
- Etymology: John Duncan

Geography
- Location within British Columbia Location within Canada
- Interactive map of Mount Duncan
- Country: Canada
- Province: British Columbia
- District: Kootenay Land District
- Protected area: Glacier National Park
- Parent range: Selkirk Mountains; Battle Range
- Topo map: NTS 82N3 Mount Wheeler

Climbing
- First ascent: 1913

Mount Duncan is a 3,202-metre (10,505-foot) summit in British Columbia, Canada.

== Description ==
Mount Duncan is located along the southern boundary of Glacier National Park and is part of the Battle Range, a subrange of the Selkirk Mountains. The mountain is situated at the head of the Duncan River which the mountain is named after. Precipitation runoff from the mountain drains north into headwaters of the Beaver River, and southeast to the Duncan River. Mount Duncan is more notable for its steep rise above local terrain than for its absolute elevation. Topographic relief is significant as the summit rises 1,650 meters (5,413 ft) above Butters Creek in 2.5 km (1.6 mi).

== History ==
The mountain was named in 1890 by Harold Ward Topham, Emil Huber, and Henry Forster, in association with the Duncan River. The river is named for John (Jack) Duncan, an early prospector who worked claims along the lower reaches of the river that now bears his name. He was a candidate for the colonial Legislative Council from the Kootenay Land District in 1866, and died circa 1900. The mountain's toponym was officially adopted on July 29, 1904, by the Geographical Names Board of Canada.

The first ascent of the summit was made at 9:10 a.m. on August 25, 1913, by Edward W. D. Holway, Ernest Feus, and Christian Häsler. By 12:45 p.m. that same day, they were on the summit of Beaver Mountain one kilometer west and claiming another first ascent.

== Climate ==
Based on the Köppen climate classification, Mount Duncan is located in a subarctic climate zone with cold, snowy winters, and mild summers. Winter temperatures can drop below −20 °C with wind chill factors below −30 °C. This climate supports the Duncan Névé on the north slope and Duncan Glacier on the east slope of the peak.

== Gallery ==
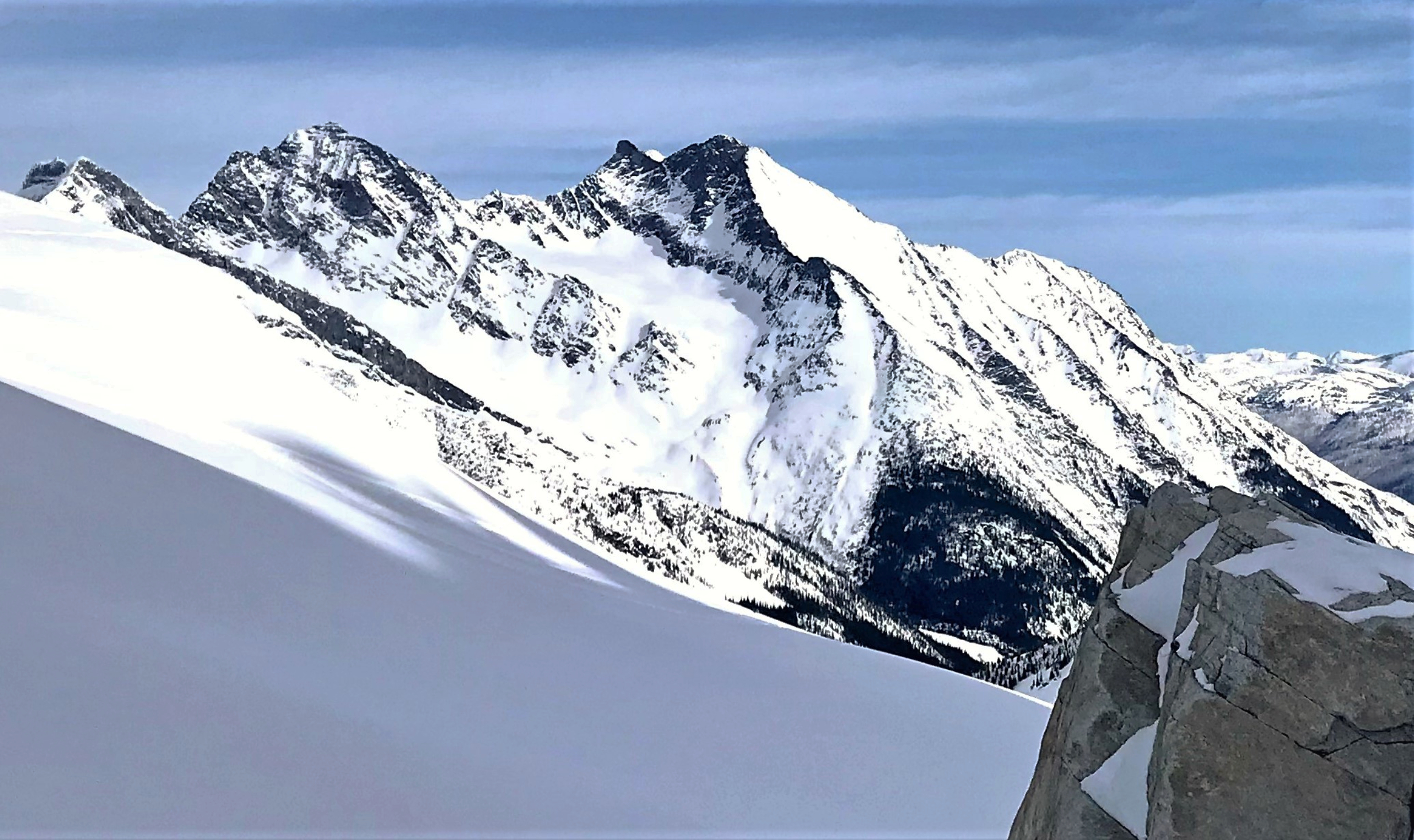
Duncan centered, Beaver to left

== See also ==
- Geography of British Columbia
