= Drewry =

Drewry may refer to:

== People ==
- Drewry (surname)

== Places ==
- Drewry's Bluff
- Drewry Point Provincial Park
- Drewry, North Carolina, a community located on the border of Vance County, North Carolina, and Warren County, North Carolina

== Companies ==
- Drewry's Beer
- Drewry Car Co.
- Shelvoke and Drewry

== Other ==
- CSS Drewry
