= Battle Range =

Mountain range in British Columbia, Canada

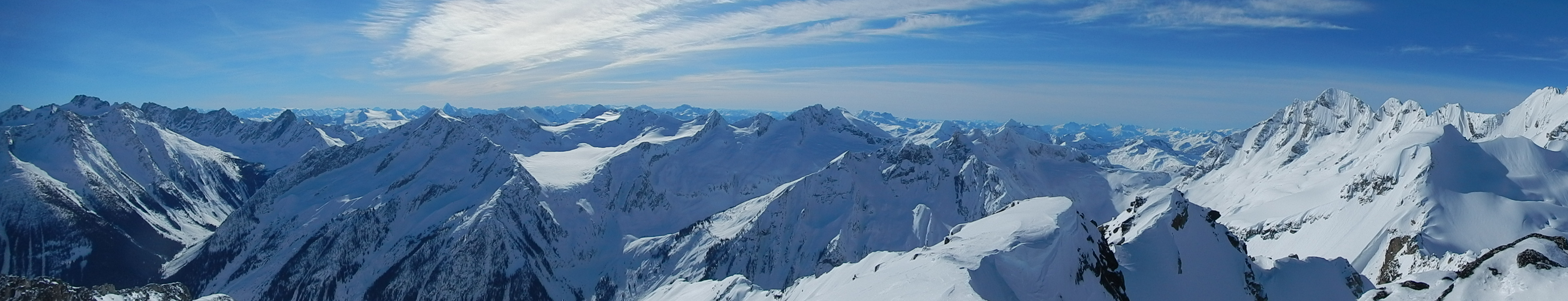
- Battle Range, from Typee Mountain

Geography
- Location within British Columbia Location within Canada
- Country: Canada
- Province: British Columbia
- District: Kootenay Land District
- Range coordinates: 50°55′N 117°20′W
- Parent range: Selkirk Mountains
- Topo map: NTS 82K14 Westfall River

The Battle Range is a subrange of the Selkirk Mountains of the Columbia Mountains in southeastern British Columbia, Canada, located between Incomappleux River and Duncan River south of Battle Brook. It is named in association with Battle Brook which in turn was the site of a legendary battle between a grizzly bear and 1890s prospector George Ritchie.

== Climate ==
Based on the Köppen climate classification, the Battle Range is located in a subarctic climate zone with cold, snowy winters, and mild summers. Winter temperatures can drop below −20 °C with wind chill factors below −30 °C.

== See also ==
- Geography of British Columbia
- Beaver Mountain
- Mount Butters
- Foremast Peak
- Mainmast Peak
- Moby Dick Mountain
- Mount Duncan
- Mount Proteus
- Nautilus Mountain
- Omoo Peak
- Pequod Mountain
- Scylla Mountain
- Wrong Peak
