= Drewery =

Drewery is a surname. Notable people with the surname include:

- Corinne Drewery (born 1959), British singer-songwriter and fashion designer
- Edward Drewery (1851–1940), British-born Canadian brewer and politician

== See also ==
- Drewry (surname)
