= Drewry Point Provincial Park =

Provincial park in British Columbia, Canada

- IUCN category II (national park)
- Location within British Columbia
- Interactive map of Drewry Point Provincial Park
- Location: Kootenay Land District, British Columbia, Canada
- Nearest city: Nelson, BC
- Coordinates: 49°24′54″N 116°48′40″W
- Area: 26 ha (64 acres)
- Established: May 5, 1970
- Governing body: BC Parks

Drewry Point Provincial Park is a provincial park in British Columbia, Canada, on the west side of Kootenay Lake, southeast of the city of Nelson.
