= Moby Dick Mountain =

Mountain in the country of Canada

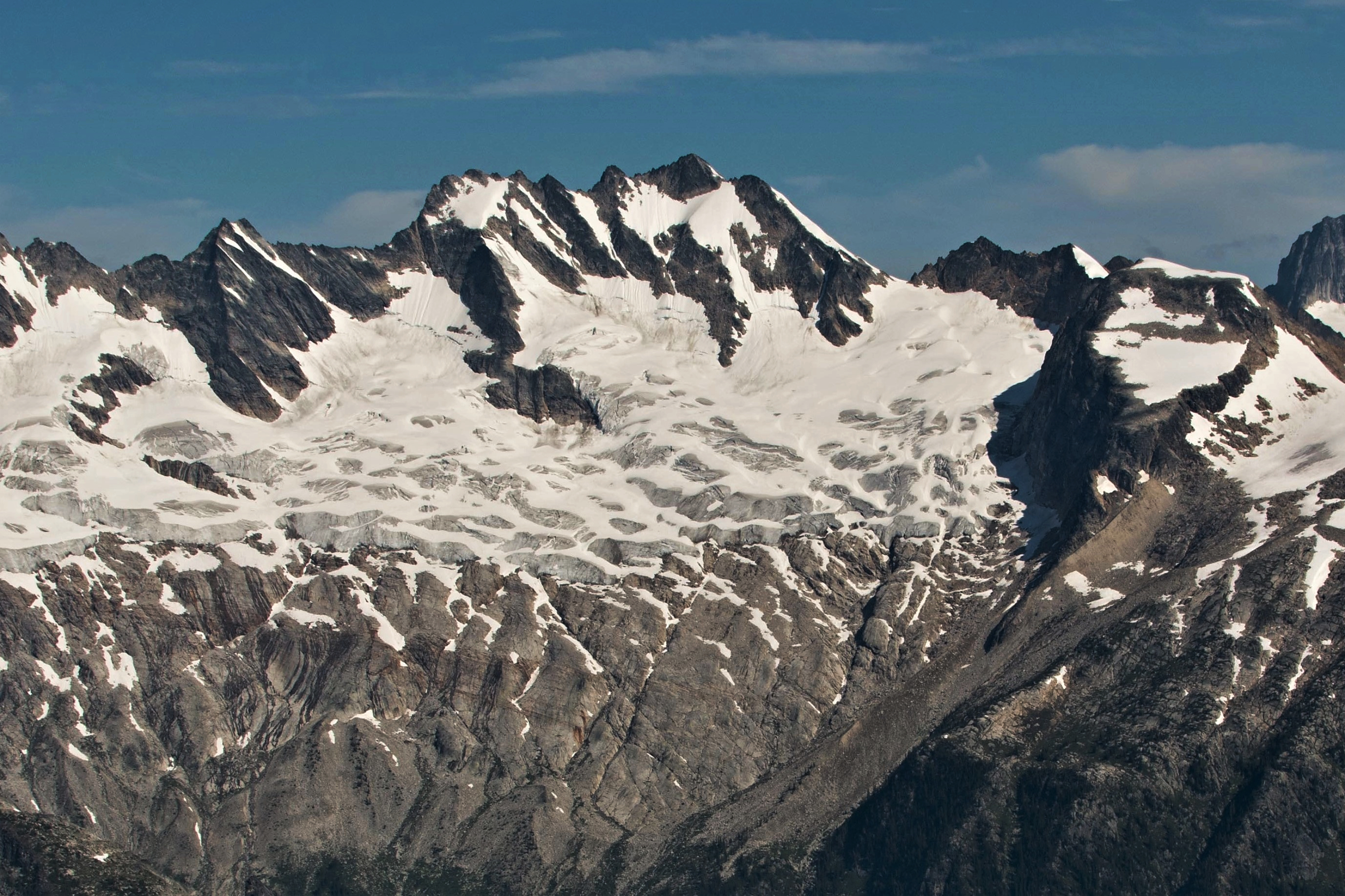
- Southeast slope, centered

Highest point
- Elevation: 3,154 m (10,348 ft)
- Prominence: 174 m (571 ft)
- Parent peak: Mount Proteus (3,198 m)
- Isolation: 2.16 km (1.34 mi)
- Listing: Mountains of British Columbia
- Coordinates: 50°57′43″N 117°24′24″W

Naming
- Etymology: Moby Dick (whale)

Geography
- Location within British Columbia Location within Canada
- Interactive map of Moby Dick Mountain
- Country: Canada
- Province: British Columbia
- District: Kootenay Land District
- Parent range: Selkirk Mountains; Battle Range
- Topo map: NTS 82K14 Westfall River

Geology
- Mountain type: Fault block
- Rock type: Granite

Climbing
- First ascent: July 26, 1959; S. Silverstein, D, Anger, F. Riley
- Easiest route: class 4 South Face Rib

Moby Dick Mountain is a 3,154-metre (10,348-foot) summit in British Columbia, Canada.

== Description ==
Moby Dick Mountain is located 0.5 km (0.31 mi) west of Pequod Mountain in the Battle Range of the Selkirk Mountains. The remote peak is set approximately 10 km (6.2 mi) south of Glacier National Park. Precipitation runoff from the mountain drains north to Battle Brook which is a tributary of the Incomappleux River, and south into Houston Creek which is a tributary of the Duncan River. Moby Dick Mountain is notable for its steep rise above local terrain and for its absolute elevation. Topographic relief is significant as the summit rises 1,450 meters (4,757 ft) in 1.5 km (0.93 mi) on the north aspect and 1,450 meters (4,921 ft) above Houston Creek in 3 km (1.9 mi) on the south side.

== History ==
The landform is named after Moby Dick, the whale in Herman Melville's novel Moby-Dick which was published in 1851. The name was applied by mountaineer Douglas Anger and submitted in 1960 by Sam Silverstein of the Alpine Club of Canada. Anger imagined the mountain's features resembled a large white whale. It follows the Herman Melville-associated naming theme of the area established by the Sam Silverstein-Douglas Anger climbing party who made the first ascent of Moby Dick in 1959 along with Fenwick Riley. The mountain's toponym was officially adopted on November 1, 1963, by the Geographical Names Board of Canada.

== Climate ==
Based on the Köppen climate classification, Moby Dick Mountain is located in a subarctic climate zone with cold, snowy winters, and mild summers. Winter temperatures can drop below −20 °C with wind chill factors below −30 °C. This climate supports the Pequod Glacier on the east slope of the peak, the Moby Dick Glacier on the south slope, an unnamed glacier on the north slope, and the Proteus Glacier to the west.

== Gallery ==
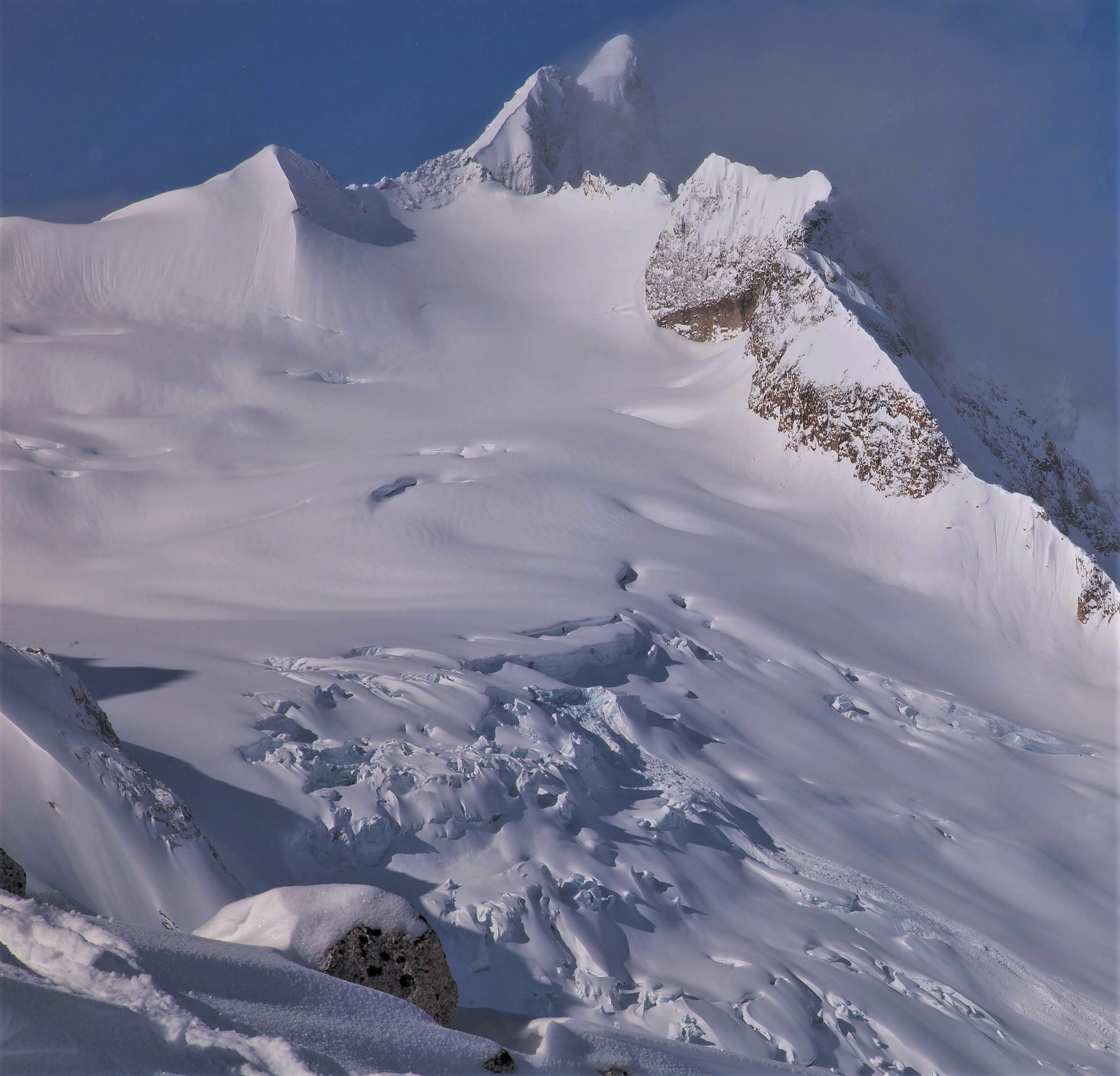
The top of Moby Dick Mountain appears above Pequod Mountain and Pequod Glacier

== See also ==
- Geography of British Columbia
