= Battle Brook =

Stream in Minnesota, U.S.

Coordinates: 45°28′08″N 93°38′30″W

Battle Brook is a stream in the U.S. state of Minnesota.

Battle Brook was named for a falling out between workers of a local lumber company.

== See also ==
- List of rivers of Minnesota
