= Beaver Mountain (British Columbia) =

Mountain in the country of Canada

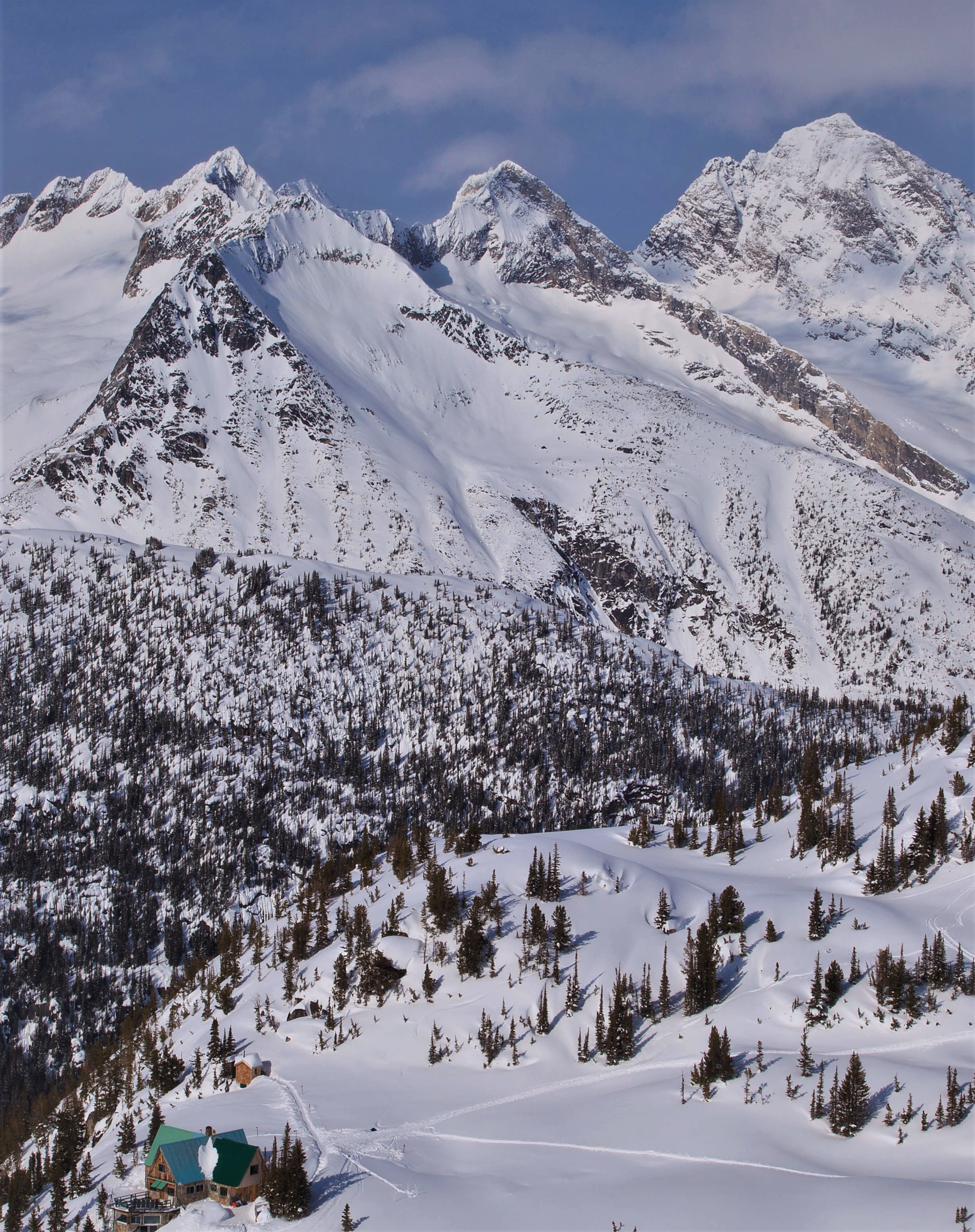
- Southwest aspect, summit upper right

Highest point
- Elevation: 3,212 m (10,538 ft)
- Prominence: 432 m (1,417 ft)
- Parent peak: Sugarloaf Mountain (3,254 m)
- Isolation: 1.94 km (1.21 mi)
- Listing: Mountains of British Columbia
- Coordinates: 51°02′16″N 117°19′56″W

Naming
- Etymology: Beaver River

Geography
- Location within British Columbia Location within Canada
- Interactive map of Beaver Mountain
- Country: Canada
- Province: British Columbia
- District: Kootenay Land District
- Protected area: Glacier National Park
- Parent range: Selkirk Mountains; Battle Range
- Topo map: NTS 82N3 Mount Wheeler

Climbing
- First ascent: 1913

Beaver Mountain is a 3,212-metre (10,538-foot) mountain summit in British Columbia, Canada.

== Description ==
Beaver Mountain is located in the Battle Range of the Selkirk Mountains. The remote peak is situated southwest of the head of the Beaver River and is set on the southern boundary of Glacier National Park. Precipitation runoff from the mountain drains north into the headwaters of Beaver River, and south into Butters Creek which is a tributary of the Duncan River. Beaver Mountain is more notable for its steep rise above local terrain than for its absolute elevation. Topographic relief is significant as the summit rises 1,600 meters (5,250 ft) above Butters Creek in 3 km (1.9 mi).

== History ==
The mountain was named in August 1890 by Harold Ward Topham of the Alpine Club of England, and Herr Emil Huber and Herr Carl Sultzer of the Swiss Alpine Club. The mountain is named in association with Beaver River, which in turn was named for the great number of beavers that once inhabited the valley. The mountain's toponym was officially adopted on July 29, 1904, by the Geographical Names Board of Canada.

The first ascent of the summit was made August 25, 1913, by Edward W. D. Holway, Ernest Feus and Christian Häsler, Jr.

== Climate ==
Based on the Köppen climate classification, Beaver Mountain is located in a subarctic climate zone with cold, snowy winters, and mild summers. Winter temperatures can drop below −20 °C with wind chill factors below −30 °C. This climate supports the Duncan Névé and Beaver Glacier on the north slope, and two smaller unnamed glaciers on the south slope of the peak.

== Gallery ==
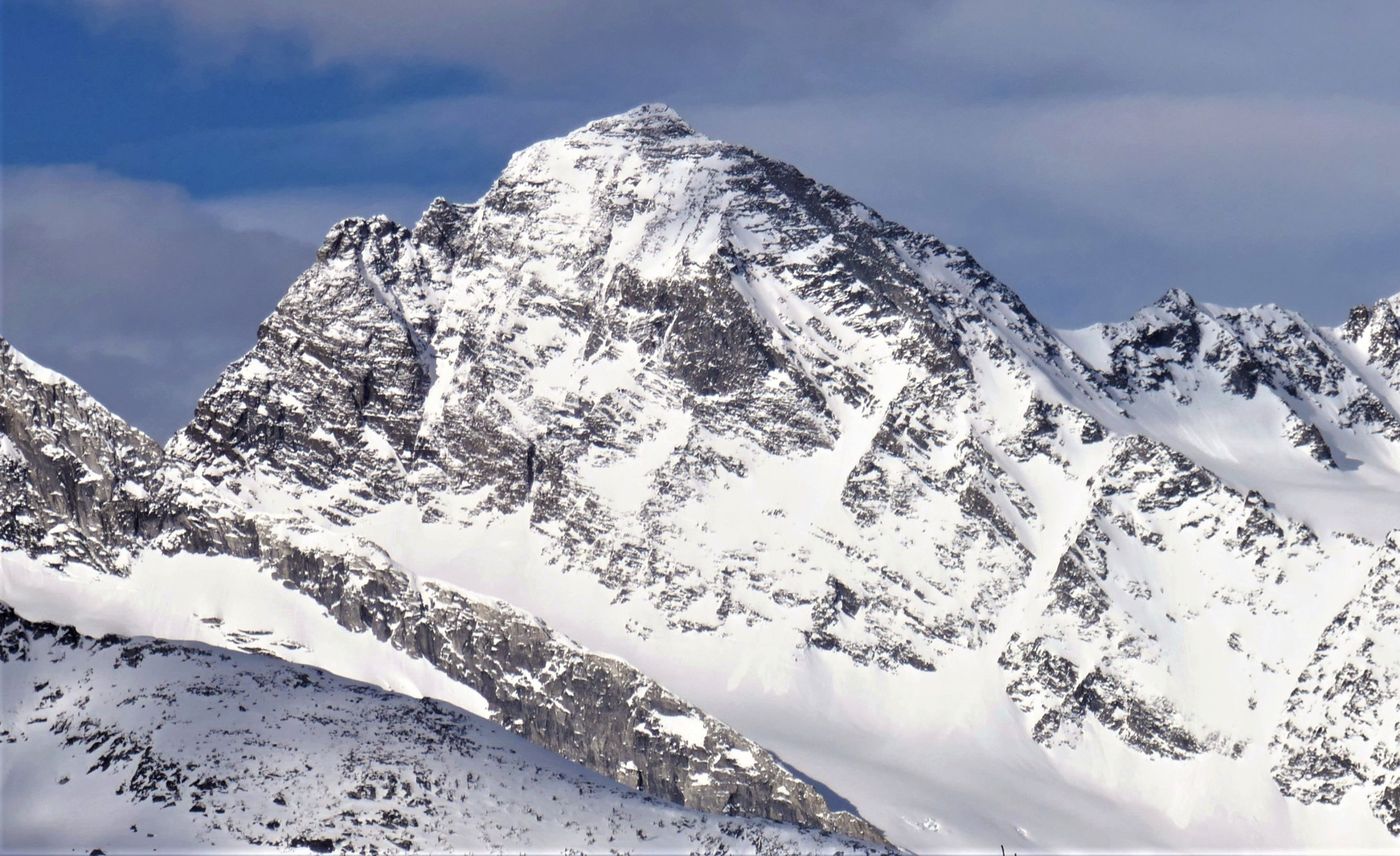
Beaver Mountain

== See also ==
- Geography of British Columbia
