= Typee Mountain =

Mountain in British Columbia, Canada

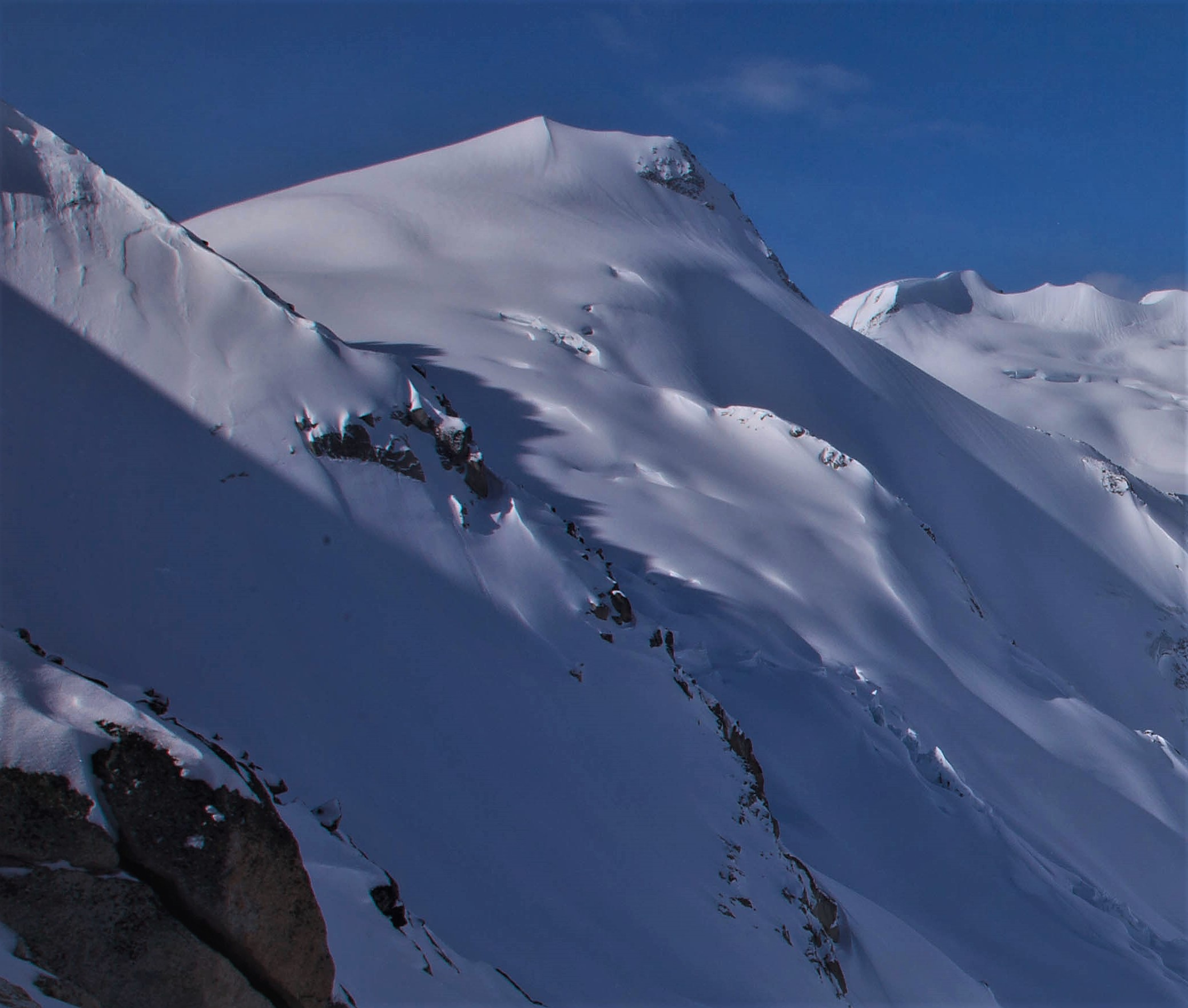
- East aspect in winter

Highest point
- Elevation: 2,897 m (9,505 ft)
- Prominence: 143 m (469 ft)
- Parent peak: Mount Proteus (3,198 m)
- Isolation: 2.13 km (1.32 mi)
- Listing: Mountains of British Columbia
- Coordinates: 50°57′29″N 117°22′40″W

Naming
- Etymology: Typee

Geography
- Location within British Columbia Location within Canada
- Interactive map of Typee Mountain
- Country: Canada
- Province: British Columbia
- District: Kootenay Land District
- Parent range: Selkirk Mountains; Battle Range
- Topo map: NTS 82K14 Westfall River

Typee Mountain is a 2,897-metre (9,505-foot) summit in British Columbia, Canada.

== Description ==
Typee Mountain is located in the Battle Range of the Selkirk Mountains. The remote peak is set approximately 10 km (6.2 mi) south of Glacier National Park. Precipitation runoff from the mountain drains north into Butters Creek and south into Houston Creek which are both tributaries of the Duncan River. Typee Mountain is more notable for its steep rise above local terrain than for its absolute elevation. Topographic relief is significant as the summit rises 1,500 meters (4,921 ft) above Houston Creek in 2.75 km (1.71 mi).

== Etymology ==
The landform is named after Typee, which was Herman Melville's first novel published in 1846. In the novel, "Typee" refers to the valley of Taipivai, once known as Taipi. The name was submitted by author/mountaineer Robert Kruszyna in 1972 and follows the Herman Melville-associated naming theme of the area established in 1958–59 by the Sam Silverstein-Douglas Anger climbing party. The mountain's toponym was officially adopted on October 3, 1973, by the Geographical Names Board of Canada.

== Climate ==
Based on the Köppen climate classification, Typee Mountain is located in a subarctic climate zone with cold, snowy winters, and mild summers. Winter temperatures can drop below −20 °C with wind chill factors below −30 °C. This climate supports the Pequod Glacier on the north slope of the peak.

== Gallery ==
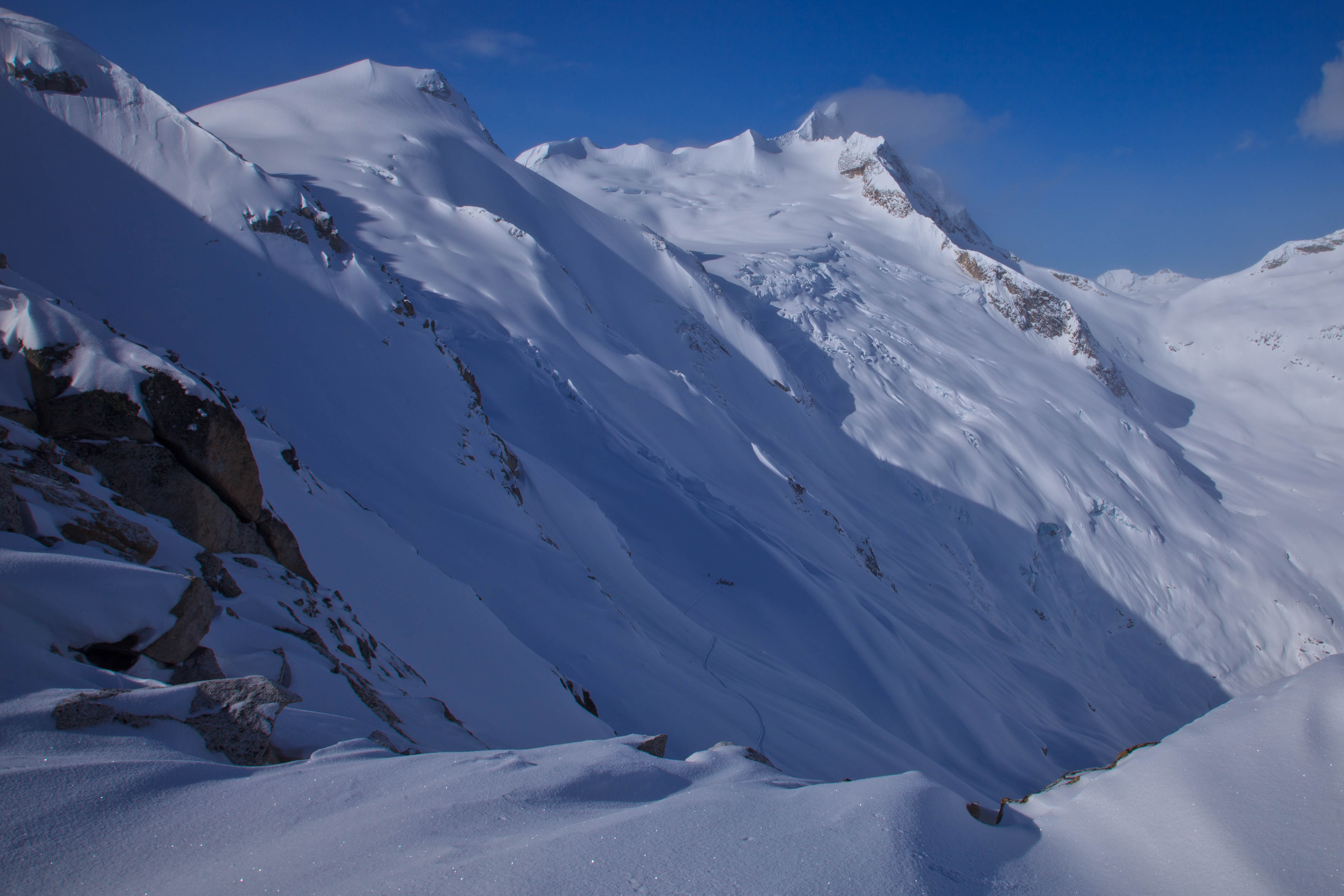
Typee Mountain and Pequod Mountain

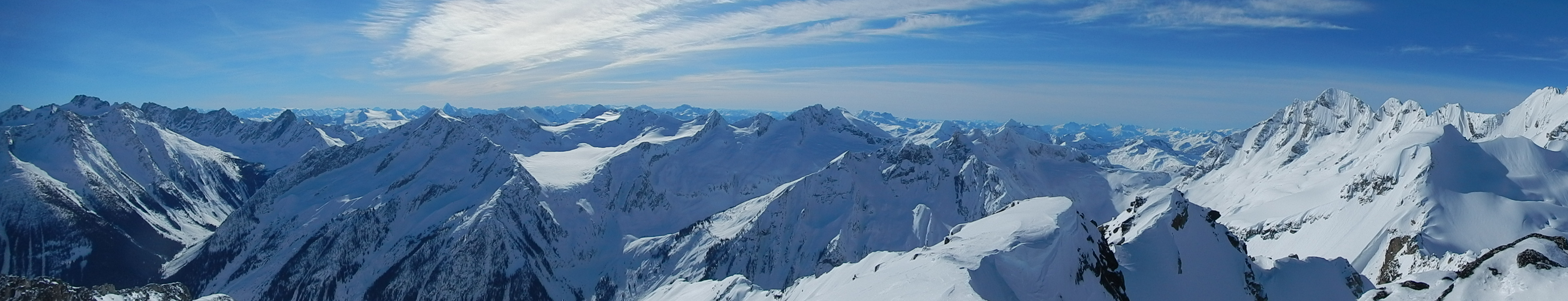
Battle Range, from summit of Typee

== See also ==
- Outrigger Peak
- Geography of British Columbia
