= Drewry (surname) =

Drewry is an English surname. Notable people with the surname include:

- Arthur Drewry (1891–1961), English director of football and FIFA president
- Christopher Drewry, British Army general
- David Drewry (born 1947), English glaciologist and geophysicist
- George Leslie Drewry (1894–1918), English Royal Navy officer and Victoria Cross recipient
- James Sidney Drewry (1883–1952), British engineer
- Patrick H. Drewry (1875–1947), American politician
