= Mount Proteus =

Mountain in the country of Canada

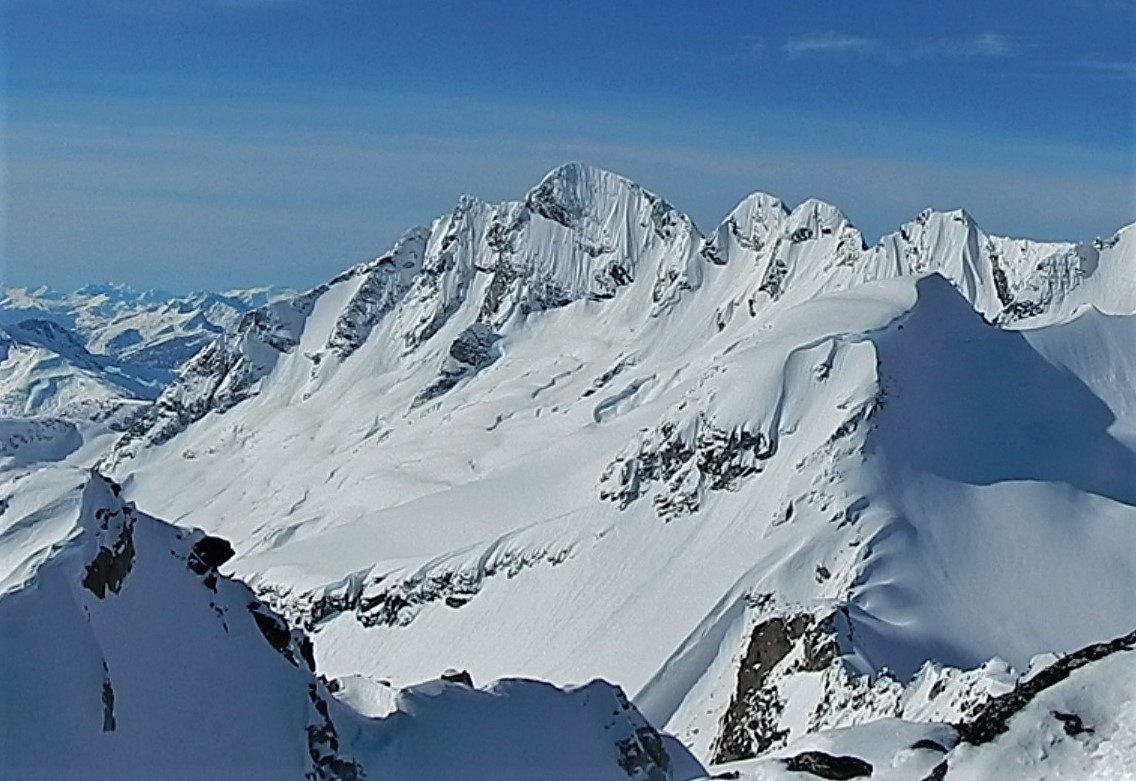
- East aspect, viewed from Typee Mountain

Highest point
- Elevation: 3,198 m (10,492 ft)
- Prominence: 918 m (3,012 ft)
- Parent peak: Beaver Mountain (3,212 m)
- Isolation: 12.07 km (7.50 mi)
- Listing: Mountains of British Columbia
- Coordinates: 50°56′56″N 117°25′47″W

Naming
- Etymology: Proteus

Geography
- Location within British Columbia Location within Canada
- Country: Canada
- Province: British Columbia
- District: Kootenay Land District
- Parent range: Selkirk Mountains; Battle Range
- Topo map: NTS 82K14 Westfall River

Geology
- Mountain type: Fault block
- Rock type: Granite

Climbing
- First ascent: 1947

Mount Proteus is a 3,198-metre (10,492-foot) mountain summit in British Columbia, Canada.

== Description ==
Mount Proteus is located in the Battle Range of the Selkirk Mountains. The remote peak is set approximately 13 km (8.1 mi) south of Glacier National Park. Precipitation runoff from the mountain drains north to Battle Brook which is a tributary of the Incomappleux River, and east into Houston Creek which is a tributary of the Duncan River. Mount Proteus is notable for its steep rise above local terrain as topographic relief is significant with the summit rising 1,200 m (3,900 ft) above Houston Creek in 1.5 km (0.93 mi), and 2,300 m (7,500 ft) above Battle Brook valley in 6 km (3.7 mi).

== History ==
The mountain is named for Proteus, the mythological Greek sea god who was difficult to identify or lay hold of because of his ability to change character, which is also an attribute of this mountain. The mountain's toponym was officially adopted on November 1, 1963, by the Geographical Names Board of Canada.

The first ascent of the summit was made in 1947 by Norman Brewster, Andrew J. Kauffman II, and his wife Betty.

== Climate ==
Based on the Köppen climate classification, Mount Proteus is located in a subarctic climate zone with cold, snowy winters, and mild summers. Winter temperatures can drop below −20 °C with wind chill factors below −30 °C. This climate supports the Proteus Glacier on the west slope and Moby Dick Glacier on the east slope of the peak.

== See also ==
- Geography of British Columbia
- Moby Dick Mountain
