= Andrew Kauffman =

American mountaineer

Andrew J. Kauffman II
- Born: 1920
- Died: 2002 (aged 81–82)
- Education: Harvard 1943
- Occupation: Mountaineer
- Employer: United States Department of State 1943-1973
- Known for: First ascent of Gasherbrum I, first ascent of Mount Proteus
- Title: Vice president of the American Alpine Club
- Spouses: Betty Conant (divorced); Daphne Ennis (estranged)

Andrew John Kauffman II (1920–2002) was an American mountaineer who made the first ascent of Gasherbrum I on 5 July 1958 with Pete Schoening. He also made the first ascent of Mount Proteus in 1947. Kauffman also served as vice president of the American Alpine Club.

== Publications ==
- Kauffman, Andrew J.; Putnam, William L. (1992). K2: The 1939 Tragedy. Seattle, WA: Mountaineers. ISBN 978-0-89886-323-9.
