= Duncan River (British Columbia) =

River in southeastern British Columbia

- Location within British Columbia

Location
- Country: Canada
- Province: British Columbia
- District: Kootenay Land District

Physical characteristics
- Source: Near Mount Dawson
  - location: Purcell Trench
- Mouth: Kootenay River
  - location: Kootenay Lake
  - coordinates: 50°10′22″N 116°56′07″W
- Length: 206 km (128 mi)
- Basin size: 2,443 km^{2} (943 sq mi)
- Discharge
  - location: Below Lardeau River
  - average: 162 m^{3}/s (5,700 cu ft/s)
  - minimum: 12.8 m^{3}/s (450 cu ft/s)
  - maximum: 807 m^{3}/s (28,500 cu ft/s)

The Duncan River is in the West Kootenay region of southeastern British Columbia. Entering the North Arm of Kootenay Lake, the river is a major tributary of the Kootenay River, which in turn flows into the Columbia River. The Selkirk Mountains lie to the west and the Purcell Mountains to the east.

== Name origin ==
The earliest known mention of the river name was 1889 in honour of John (Jack) Duncan, a prospector and candidate for the colonial Legislative Council from the Kootenay Land District in 1866.

== Duncan Lake ==
Duncan Lake is a man-made reservoir lake in the Kootenay region of British Columbia, Canada, formed by Duncan Dam and about 45 km in length. It is fed by the Duncan River, which forms part of the boundary between the Selkirk Mountains to the west and the Purcell Mountains to the east. Below Duncan Dam is the head of Kootenay Lake.

Prior to inundation there was a lake of shorter length at the same location, also named Duncan Lake but also known as Upper Kootenay Lake or Upper Kootenai Lake. The name comes from the Duncan River's namesake, John "Jack" Duncan, prospector, who ran for election but did not win the Kootenay District seat on the colonial Legislative Council of British Columbia.

The lake, which divides the upper and lower parts of the river, takes its name from the latter. The lake was called Ecclesion by Father De Smet on his 1846 map, Upper Kootenay by Moberly around 1866 and Trutch in 1871, Upper Kootenai on government maps in 1890, and Howser by John Retallack and Duncan by Perry in 1893. The name Duncan had prevailed for the lake by 1912 and Howser for the community by 1905.

== River traffic ==
Thousands of years ago, prior to reclamation by silting, the present mouth of Meadow Creek (about 10 kilometres (6 mi) up the Duncan River) was part of Kootenay Lake. First Nations have camped in this locality each August to fish for kokanee salmon.

In 1889, Andrew Jardine, Jack Allen Jack MacDonald came by rowboat from Kootenay Lake as far north as Howser creek to prospect. By the early 1890s, various small craft were travelling northward between the timbered slopes bordering the turbulent, log-jammed river. The upper reaches of the upper river required a combination of canoeing and portage. The lower river could be bypassed by taking the trail north from Argenta to Duncan City (Howser), which by 1893 was a tent city near the foot of the lake housing prospectors waiting for the snow to melt and spring flooding to subside.

In 1897, the Idaho was the first steamboat to successfully navigate the lower river between the lakes. However, a steamer had to winch its way through the Cooper Creek rapids by anchoring a line to a tree on the shore. That summer, the Idaho carried prospectors and supplies on regular 32-kilometre (20 mi) runs into the upper river as far as a log jam.

After leaving Duncan City, the Idaho would travel about 11 kilometres (7 mi) north to Jubilee Point on the east shore, the headquarters of the Gold Hill Exploration and Development Co. The Matthews ranch was also on the peninsular. On the northern tip was a government assay office. In later decades, only the flagpole and rock fireplaces remained of the abandoned assay facilities, prior to flooding by the Duncan Dam reservoir, which changed the peninsular into an island.

The 19-kilometre (12 mi) packhorse trail from Argenta was more frequented than the lower river. Since 1896, the federal government had been clearing the lower river of obstructions to make it navigable for eight months of the year. By 1900, the clearing cost $3,000 annually.

In 1902, the steamer Argenta operated on the river as far north as the landing at Hall Creek. Healy's Landing, which was midway between Howser and Hall creeks, was the primary northern terminal for river traffic and the southern one for packhorses travelling 19 kilometres (12 mi) to Hall Creek.

Once the railway was built, the lower river was no longer kept clear by the government and became unnavigable for larger vessels. However, Howser farmers would raft their produce downriver.

The upper river was kept clear but was only navigable by small boats from May to early September, when the water was sufficiently high.

During the 1930s, logs were manoeuvred down the river from the upper Duncan to the sawmill at Howser. The forestry phone line, which was attached to trees, followed the east shore of the lake and river to McGuire Creek and then terminated at Healy. During 1930–1936, significant placer mining occurred around Hall Creek. At the time, people lobbied for a road from the foot of the lake up the east side of the river to Healy's Landing, where a trail extended to Hall Creek.

By 1940, the upper valley was largely deserted. The completion of the dam on the lower river in 1967 reduced the stagnant pools where mosquitoes bred, reducing the severe mosquito problem by 80 per cent. Although forest, wildlife habitat, and homes on lower ground were submerged, the reservoir became popular for fishing and boating.

== Railways ==
In 1899, two railways were competing to grade northward from Kootenay Lake to Duncan City. The Great Northern Railway (GN) route ran from Argenta up the east side of the Duncan River, before crossing near the then foot of Duncan Lake. The Canadian Pacific Railway (CP) route was from Lardeau up the west side of the Lardeau River, before crossing to the east shore near Leblanc (Marblehead).

CP surveyed the Howser Pass (immediately west of Howser) before GN. Allegedly, when CP blocked GN access to this pass, which is less than 30 metres (100 ft) wide for quarter of a mile, GN proceeded no farther north. Both railways had claimed their tracks would reach Duncan City by the fall. However, no tracklaying occurred in 1899 or 1900. By year end, the 610-metre (2,000 ft) GN bridge across the river was nearing completion.

In 1901, CP abandoned the grade from Marblehead to Duncan City. A new grade was constructed northward wholly along the Lardeau River, crossing the river parallel with Duncan City (Howser), but on the opposite side of the pass. The trestle pilings over Limey's Slough on the abandoned grade about 2 kilometres (1.2 mi) northeast of Marblehead remained until the dam was built. CP built a wagon road through the pass to connect Howser station on the west to Howser on the east. The new grade joined the old grade about 3 kilometres (2 mi) north of Howser station. Starting from Lardeau, CP finally laid track, reaching the second crossing at Gold Hill that November.

GN laid neither ties nor rail, leaving the rail grade abandoned by 1903. Fifty years later, thousands of rotted ties still remained stacked beside the grade. The former grade was converted to a wagon road. When a log jam burst on Hamill Creek in 1916, washing out the rail bridge and changing the course of the creek, the road was diverted around this location.

In 1920, CP replaced the bridge across the Lardeau about 1.6 kilometres (1 mi) south of the Howser train station.

In 1942, CP abandoned the line and the rail bed was adapted to become a public highway.

== Course ==
The Duncan is about 128 kilometres (80 mi) long, flowing south along the Purcell Trench from the source near Mount Duncan at the southeast border of Glacier National Park. The drainage basin is over 2,400 square kilometres (930 sq mi).

Prior to enlargement by the dam, the lake was 16 kilometres (10 mi) long. The dam extended the lake about 5 kilometres (3 mi) southward, submerging largely an area of sloughs. During the annual filling of the reservoir, the lake stretches about 26 kilometres (16 mi) into the upper river.

A large number of small precipitous glacial streams flow into the upper river and some into the lower river. Except in winter and early spring, glacial silt clouds the water. The river supplies 75 per cent of the water entering the north end of Kootenay Lake.

Significant upper tributaries include Puddingbow, S.O.B., and B.B. creeks. Lake tributaries include Griz, North, Gallop, Little Glacier, Howser, Idaho, Maude, Labarie, and Tiger creeks (but the latter five are upper river at low water). Lower tributaries are Hamill, Cooper, Glacier, and Meadow creeks.

The mouth was originally on the west side of Kootenay Lake rather than the present east side. Known as the big Argenta Slough, the channel was cut in the early 1890s as a shortcut to the river from Argenta.

== Ferries and road bridges ==
In 1893, a ferry was established about 3 kilometres (2 mi) north of the Lardeau River mouth, where the trail north from Argenta crossed the river below the then Duncan Lake shore. The ferry remained in operation at least until 1899.

Near the Canning Rapids at the mouth of Glacier Creek and about 1.6 kilometres (1 mi) south of the GN trestle bridge, a 170-metre (550 ft) road bridge, proposed in 1913, was unsuccessfully tendered. Retendered, the Canning Bridge was completed in 1914–15. A road bridge may have been previously constructed in 1908 in the vicinity.

E.W. Senff homesteaded near the mouth of Hamill Creek. In 1915, he installed a log 3.7-by-9.1-metre (12 by 30 ft) reaction ferry to carry his horses across the river and for public use.

The first bridge across the river was near Cooper Creek (about 2.7 kilometres (1.7 mi) from the Duncan mouth), which existed until the mid-1920s. After its demise, a replacement was immediately sought. The remaining Canning Bridge provided access from Argenta to Howser and westward through the Howser Pass to Howser station. In 1930, a 40-metre (130 ft) Howe truss replaced this bridge. By 1941, a downstream vehicle ferry was sought, which would provide access to the west side of the Lardeau River.

At Cooper Creek, an unofficial rowboat service connected both sides of the river. A surplus 30-metre (100 ft) single-lane trestle bridge at Kokanee Creek was hauled to this site. The span and approaches were installed from late 1955 and the opening was May 1956. A week later, the spring high water carried log debris, which pounded the bridge pilings. To save the main span, a section of trestle approach was removed. In 1957, a surplus Howe truss was brought from Campbell River and a two-span crossing was erected. That year, a second Howe truss replaced the earlier Canning one. In 1964, a loaded logging truck collapsed this bridge, which was replaced by a two-span 55-metre (180 ft) crossing that December. This bridge was removed not long after as part of the dam construction. In the late 1980s, the Cooper Creek bridge was replaced by one 0.8 kilometres (0.5 mi) downstream.

== Maps ==
- "Perry's mining map". wwwdavidrumsey.com. 1893.
- "Lardeau map". geography.ua.edu. 1929.
- "Shell BC map". www.davidrumsey.com. 1956.
- Pre- and Post-dam map.

== Discharge ==
Daily discharge tables 1963–2021.

== See also ==
- List of rivers of British Columbia
- Columbia River Treaty
