= Kootenay Land District =

Land district in British Columbia, Canada

Coordinates: 50°30′00″N 116°30′00″W

Kootenay Land District is a cadastral survey subdivision of the province of British Columbia, Canada, created with the rest of those on Mainland British Columbia via the Lands Act of the Colony of British Columbia in 1860. The British Columbia government's BC Names system, a subdivision of GeoBC, defines a land district as "a territorial division with legally defined boundaries for administrative purposes" All land titles and surveys use the Land District system as the primary point of reference, and entries in BC Names for placenames and geographical objects are so listed.

== Description ==
The land district comprises all those parts of the Kootenay River and Columbia River basins in the southeast corner of the province, excepting the drainages of the Okanagan, Granby, Sanpoil and Kettle Rivers, i.e. all those sub-basins of the Columbia on the west and south of the summit-line of the Monashee Mountains. Also not in the land district is the northernmost part of the Columbia's basin, north of Boat Encampment and Mica Creek, northwest of which is Cariboo Land District. To Kootenay Land District's west is Yale Land District, which includes the Kamloops-Shuswap, Okanagan and Boundary Country regions of the province. While most land districts are primarily defined by lines of latitude and longitude and survey parcel boundaries, the boundaries of Kootenay Land District are near-entirely the summit-line of the encasing mountain ranges, namely the aforementioned Monashee Mountains on the west, and the border with Alberta along the line of the Rockies.

== See also ==
- Kootenay (disambiguation)
- List of Land Districts of British Columbia
