= Yogo sapphire =

Blue sapphire variety

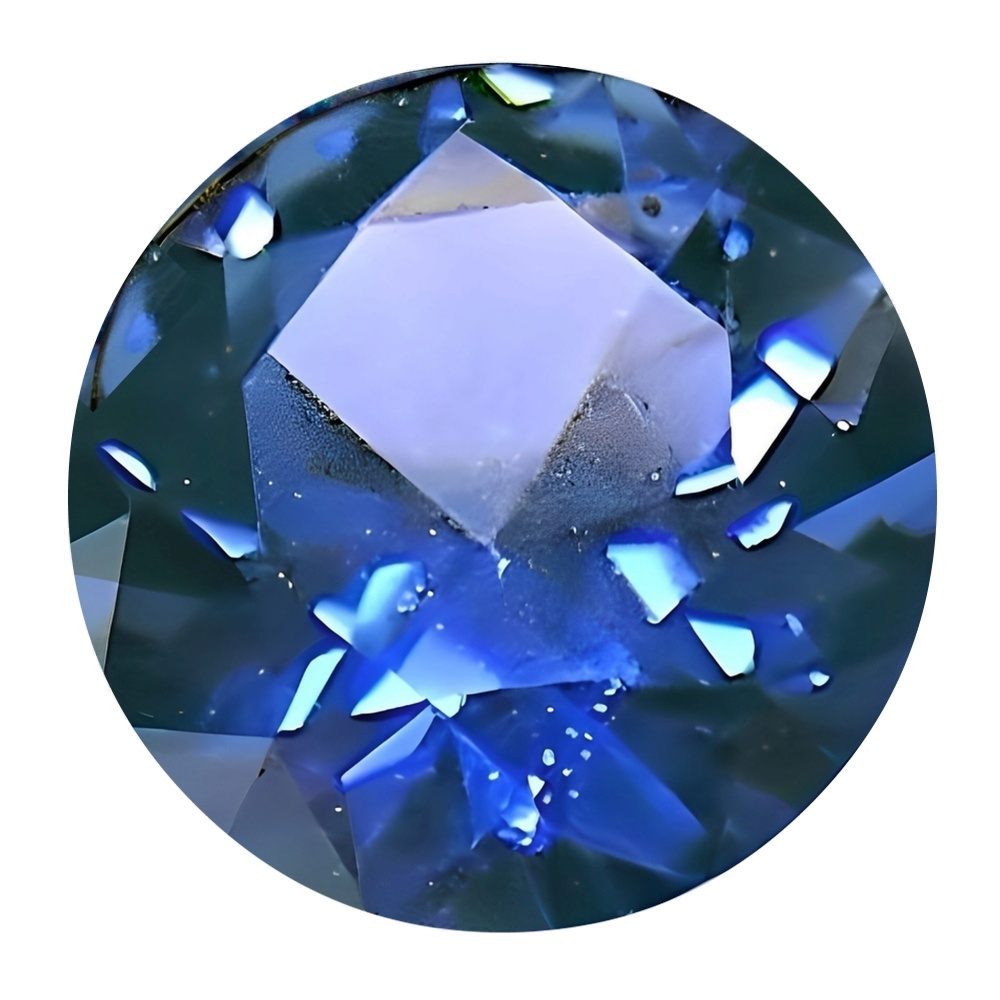
- A 0.65-carat (0.130 g) cornflower blue Yogo sapphire

General
- Category: Oxide mineral
- Formula: Aluminium oxide, Al_{2}O_{3}
- Crystal system: Trigonal
- Crystal class: Hexagonal scalenohedral (3̅m); H-M symbol: (3̅2/m)
- Space group: R3̅c

Identification
- Color: Cornflower blue to purple
- Crystal habit: Hexagonal, rhombohedral, prismatic or dipyramidal
- Twinning: Lamellar
- Cleavage: Partings on {0001} and {101̅1}
- Fracture: Uneven to conchoidal
- Tenacity: Brittle
- Mohs scale hardness: 9.0
- Luster: Adamantine to vitreous
- Specific gravity: 3.98–4.10
- Optical properties: Uniaxial (–) Abbe number 72.2
- Refractive index: n_{ω}=1.767–1.772 n_{ε}=1.759–1.763, Birefringence 0.008
- Pleochroism: Weak
- 2V angle: 58°

Yogo sapphires are blue sapphires, a colored variety of corundum, found in the US state of Montana, primarily in Yogo Gulch (part of the Little Belt Mountains) in Judith Basin County. Yogo sapphires are typically cornflower blue, a result of trace amounts of iron and titanium. They have high uniform clarity and maintain their brilliance under artificial light. Because Yogo sapphires occur within a vertically dipping resistive igneous dike, mining efforts have been sporadic and rarely profitable. It is estimated that at least 28 million carats (5.6 t or 5.5 long tons or 6.2 short tons) of Yogo sapphires are still in the ground. Jewelry containing Yogo sapphires was given to First Ladies Florence Harding and Bess Truman; in addition, many gems were sold in Europe, though promoters' claims that Yogo sapphires are in the crown jewels of England or the engagement ring of Princess Diana are dubious. Today, several Yogo sapphires are part of the Smithsonian Institution's gem collection.

Yogo sapphires were not initially recognized or valued. Gold was discovered at Yogo Creek in 1866, and though "blue pebbles" were noticed alongside gold in the stream alluvium by 1878, it was not until 1894 that the "blue pebbles" were recognized as sapphires. Sapphire mining began in 1895 after a local rancher named Jake Hoover sent a cigar box of gems he had collected to an assay office, which in turn sent them to Tiffany's in New York, where an appraiser pronounced them "the finest precious gemstones ever found in the United States". Hoover then purchased the original mother lode from a sheepherder, later selling it to other investors. This became the highly profitable "English Mine", which flourished from 1899 until the 1920s. A second operation, the "American Mine", was owned by a series of investors in the western section of the Yogo dike, but was less profitable and bought out by the syndicate that owned the English Mine. In 1984, a third set of claims, known as the Vortex mine, opened.

"Yogo sapphire" is the preferred term for gems found in the Yogo Gulch, whereas "Montana sapphire" generally refers to gems found in other Montana locations. More gem-quality sapphires are produced in Montana than anywhere else in North America. Sapphires were first discovered in Montana in 1865, in alluvium along the Missouri River. Finds in other locations in the western half of the state occurred in 1889, 1892, and 1894. The Rock Creek location, near Phillipsburg, is the most productive site in Montana, and its gems inspired the name of the nearby Sapphire Mountains. In 1969, the sapphire was co-designated along with the agate as Montana's state gemstones.

In the early 1980s, Intergem Limited, which controlled most of the Yogo sapphire mining at the time, rocked the gem world by marketing Yogo sapphires as the world's only guaranteed "untreated" sapphire, exposing a practice of the time wherein 95 percent of all the world's sapphires were heat-treated to enhance their natural color. Although Intergem went out of business, the gems it mined appeared on the market through the 1990s because the company had paid its salesmen in sapphires during its financial demise. Citibank had obtained a large stock of Yogo sapphires as a result of Intergem's collapse, and after keeping them in a vault for nearly a decade, sold its collection in 1994 to a Montana jeweler. Mining activity today is largely confined to hobby miners in the area; the major mines are currently inactive.

== Location ==
Yogo Gulch, Montana

Yogo sapphires are mined in Montana at Yogo Gulch (46°50′45″N 110°18′38″W), which is in Judith Basin County, Montana, 12 miles (19 km) southwest of Utica, 45 miles (72 km) west-southwest of Lewistown, and east of Great Falls. The site was in Fergus County when Yogo sapphires were discovered, but in 1920, because of the re-designation of county boundaries, Judith Basin County was carved out from parts of western Fergus County and eastern Cascade County.

Yogo Gulch and the corresponding natural features of Yogo Peak (8,625 feet (2,629 m)), Yogo Creek, and the Yogo dike, where the gems are mined, are all in the Little Belt Mountains within Judith Basin County. The Gulch is located along the lower reaches of Yogo Creek and west of the Judith River. The west end of the Yogo dike outcrops just southwest of Yogo Creek, about 3 miles (5 km) north of Yogo Creek's confluence with the Middle Fork of the Judith River; from there it runs east-northeast and ends about 0.5 miles (800 m) from the Judith River. Yogo Creek starts just south of Yogo Peak, which is about 15 miles (24 km) west of the Judith River. From there the creek flows southeast into the Middle Fork of the Judith River. The Judith River then flows northeast from the Little Belts toward Utica. East of the Judith River is Pig-Eye Basin, where Jake Hoover, credited as the person who discovered Yogo sapphires, owned a ranch.

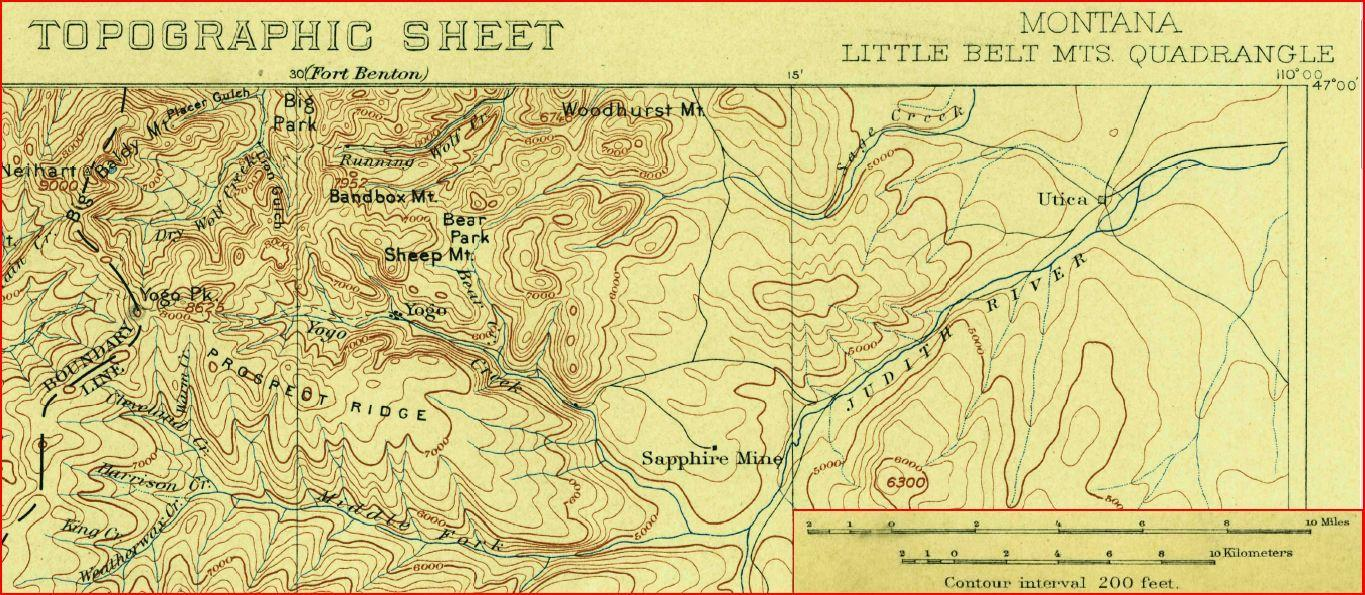
Location of the Yogo mine area from a 1902 USGS topographic map

=== Etymology ===
Because Yogo Gulch lies in a region historically inhabited by the Piikáni people, promoters of Yogo sapphires claim that yogo may mean "romance" or "blue sky" in the Blackfoot language, although there is little evidence to support this claim. (Note: No word closely resembling "yogo" appears in modern Blackfoot language dictionaries with any meaning close to the popular speculation of Yogo promoters. The Blackfoot word for the concept of courtship or wooing is isawaanopaat, the word for the color blue is ótssko, and the word for skyward is sspóóhtsi (Frantz & Russell 2000, pp. 304, 286, and 402).) Other meanings for yogo have been suggested, including "Going over the hill". The meaning of the word "Yogo" had been lost by 1878, when placer gold was found in Yogo Creek. Thus, its true meaning is uncertain.

== Mineralogy and geology ==
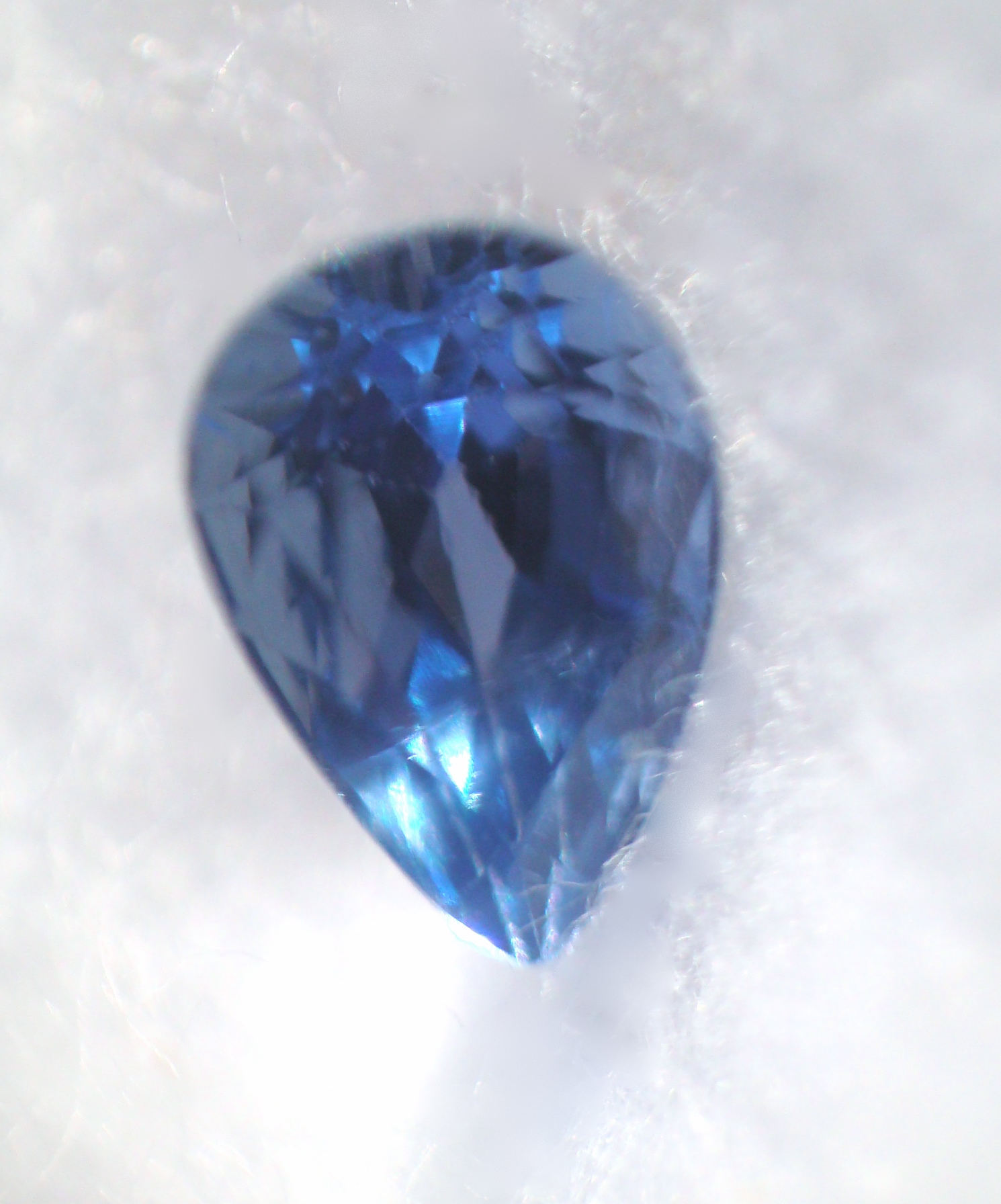
A 0.43-carat (0.086 g) teardrop-shaped cornflower blue Yogo sapphire

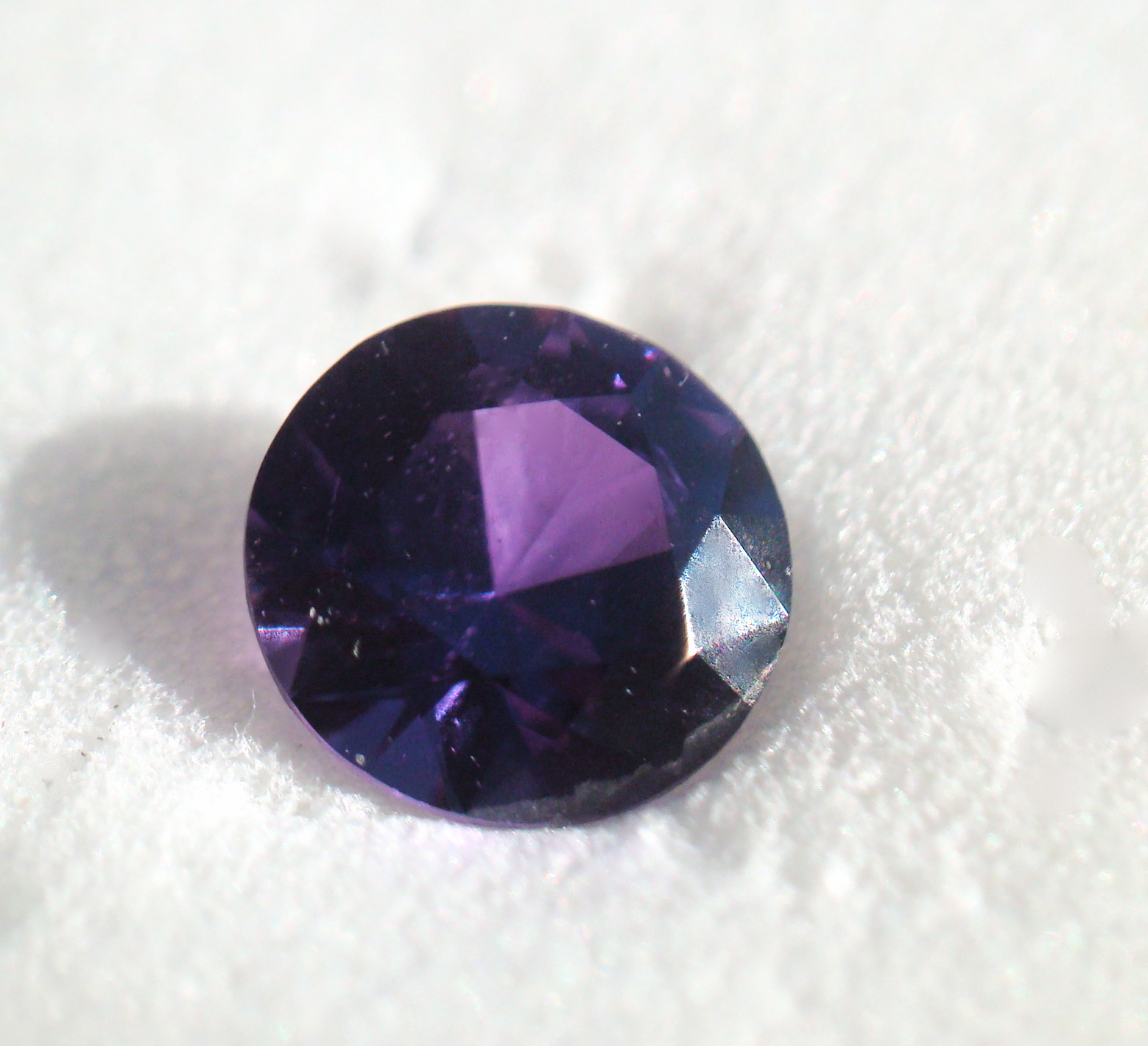
A 0.37-carat (0.074 g) brilliant cut purple Yogo sapphire. Only about two percent of Yogo sapphires are purple.

Sapphires are a color variety of corundum, a crystalline form of aluminium oxide (Al_{2}O_{3}). Corundum is one of the hardest minerals, rating 9 on the Mohs scale. Corundum gems of most colors are called sapphires, except for red ones, which are called rubies. The term "Yogo sapphire" refers only to sapphires from the Yogo Gulch. The cornflower blue color of the Yogo results from trace amounts of iron and titanium. Yogo sapphires are unique in that they are free of cavities and inclusions, have high uniform clarity, lack color zoning, and do not need heat treating because their cornflower blue coloring is uniform and deep. Unlike Asian sapphires, they maintain their brilliance in artificial light. Yogo sapphires present an advantage to gemcutters: since they are found as primary constituent minerals within an igneous bedrock rather than in sedimentary alluvial deposits where most other sapphires are located, they retain a perfect or near perfect crystalline shape, making cutting much easier, as does their lack of inclusions, color zoning, or cloudiness. Yogo sapphires also exhibit a triangular pattern on the basal plane of the flattened crystals, with thin rhombohedral crystal faces, a feature absent in sapphires from other parts of Montana.

Yogo sapphires tend to be beautiful, small, and very expensive. The United States Geological Survey and many gem experts have stated that Yogo sapphires are "among the world's finest sapphires." The roughs tend to be small and flat, so cut Yogo gems heavier than 2 carats (0.40 g) are rare. Only about 10 percent of cut pieces are over 1 carat (0.20 g). The largest recorded Yogo rough, found in 1910, weighed 19 carats (3.8 g) and was cut into an 8-carat (1.6 g) gem. The largest cut Yogo is 10.2-carat (2.04 g). Because of the rarity of large rough Yogo sapphires, Yogo gem prices begin rising sharply when they are over 0.5 carats (0.10 g), and skyrocket when they are over 1 carat (0.20 g).

Montana sapphires in general come in a variety of colors, but Yogo sapphires are almost always blue. About two percent of Yogo sapphires are purple, due to trace amounts of chromium. A very small number of rubies have been found at Yogo Gulch.

Yogo sapphires were first discovered in alluvial streambed sediments during gold mining operations in Yogo Gulch downstream from the Yogo dike, but were later traced to their source within igneous bedrock. Worldwide, other than the Yogo Gulch deposit and one small site in the Kashmir region, most other corundum is mined from the sand and gravel created by the weathering of metamorphic rock. Alluvial sapphires are found in the Far East, Australia, and in three other Montana locations—the upper Missouri River, Rock Creek, and Dry Cottonwood Creek. The location of most Yogo sapphires within igneous rock rather than from alluvial placer deposits requires difficult hard rock mining. Coupled with American labor costs, this makes their extraction fairly expensive. At least 28,000,000 carats (5,600 kg) are estimated to still be in the ground. The Yogo dike is "the only known igneous rock from which sapphire is mined".

The sapphire bearing Yogo dike is a dark gray to green intrusive rock known as a lamprophyre. The lamprophyre is an unusual igneous rock that contains a low content of silica. The rock has a porphyritic texture with large crystals of orthopyroxene and phlogopite set in a fine grained matrix. The phlogopite crystals have been used to determine the age of the dike and its crystallization temperature (900 °C (1,650 °F)). The dike also contains fragments of other rock types. These xenoliths include pieces of limestone, clastic sedimentary rocks, and gneiss. In some locations, due to the abundance of xenoliths, the dike has the appearance of a limestone breccia in an igneous matrix. One gneiss fragment found as a xenolith contains corundum. The Yogo sapphires themselves are rimmed with a reaction layer of spinel and are etched, indicating that the sapphires were not in chemical equilibrium with their host, the lamprophyre magma. This suggests the sapphire crystals may have originated in an earlier rock, such as a corundum-bearing gneiss, later assimilated by the lamprophyre magma at depth. Earlier investigators had assumed that the sapphire had crystallized from the magma with the necessary high aluminium content provided by assimilation of clay rich shales of the Proterozoic Belt Supergroup sediments which are known to be present at depth in the region.

The Yogo dike is a narrow subvertical sheet-like igneous body. It varies from 2 to 26 feet (0.61 to 7.92 m) thick and extends for 5 miles (8.0 km), striking at an azimuth of 255°. The dike is broken into three offset en echelon segments, and dates to 48.6 mya using Ar dating on phlogopite. The dike intrudes Mississippian age (360 to 325 mya) limestone and other sedimentary rocks of the Madison and Big Snowy Groups.

There has been considerable debate over the years as to the depth of the Yogo dike and how many ounces of rough sapphires per ton it contains. In the late 1970s and early 1980s, Delmer L. Brown, a geological engineer and gemologist, conducted the most thorough scientific exploration up to that time, concluding that the dike was at least 7,000 feet (2,100 m) deep and that the concentration of rough sapphires was not constant throughout the deposit. Brown found that the dike had intruded into a pre-existing fault that had been a conduit for groundwater circulation. The overlying shale, the Kibbey Formation, was deposited on an unconformity, an ancient Mississippian-age karst erosion surface, and was not intruded by the dike. This groundwater action produced collapsed zones which were intruded by the dike to form breccia zones. Recent erosion in the area removed the overlying shales and again exposed the limestone to groundwater action which produced collapse breccias which include fragments of the dike rock. He determined that the erosion of the dike in the current erosion cycle was minimal.

Brown also showed that the unique characteristics of the Yogo sapphires are related to their geological history. Most sapphires are formed under low pressure and temperature over geologically short periods of time, and this is why most non-Yogo sapphires have imperfections and inconsistent coloring. Yogo sapphires show crystalline formation under very high temperatures and pressures corresponding to a great depth, over geologically long periods of time. Brown also showed that distribution of gem rough through the dike was not consistent, so using an average "ounces per ton" was misleading. For example, the section which, despite several ownership and name changes over the years, is generally known as the "American Mine," was developed in an area dominated by post-dike breccia with significantly lower ounces per ton than the English Mine.

== Montana sapphires ==
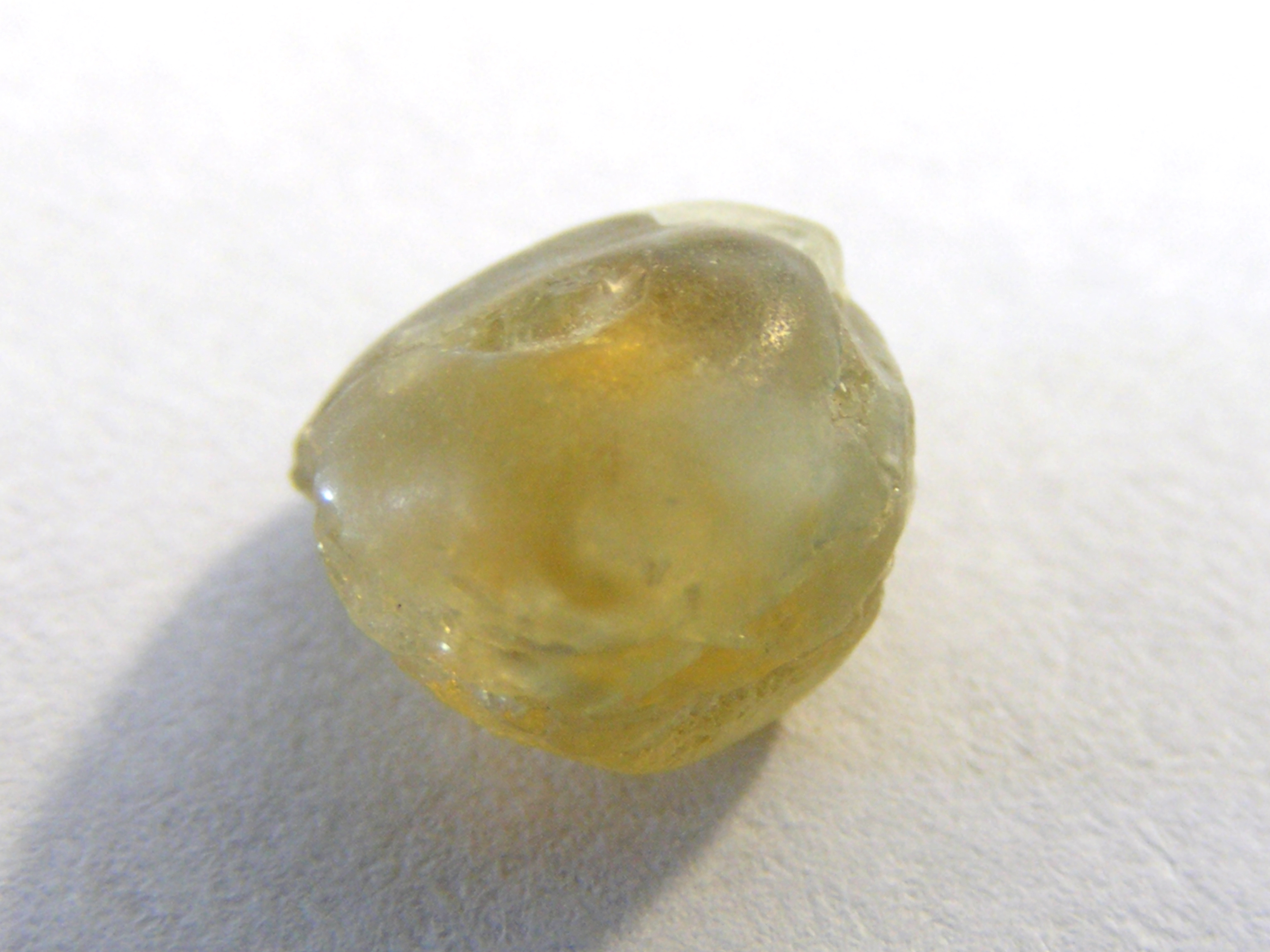
An uncut/rough yellow sapphire found at the Spokane Sapphire Mine near Helena, Montana

"Yogo sapphire" is the preferred term for gems found in the Yogo Gulch, whereas "Montana sapphire" generally refers to gems found in other Montana locations. More gem-quality sapphires are produced in Montana than anywhere else in North America. Montana sapphires come in a variety of colors, though rubies are rare.

The first sapphires found in the United States were discovered on May 5, 1865, along the Missouri River, about 14 miles (23 km) east of Helena, in Lewis and Clark County, by Ed "Sapphire" Collins. Collins sent the sapphires to Tiffany's in New York City, and to Amsterdam for evaluation; however, those sapphires were of poor coloring and low overall quality, garnering little notice and giving Montana sapphires a poor reputation. Corundum was also found at Dry Cottonwood Creek near Butte in 1889, Rock Creek near Philipsburg in 1892, and Quartz Gulch near Bozeman in 1894. By 1890, the English-owned Sapphire and Ruby Mining Company had bought several thousand acres of land where Montana sapphires were found, but the venture failed after a few years because of fraudulent practices by the owners.

Sapphires from these three sites are routinely heat-treated to enhance color. While millions of carats of sapphires have been mined from the Missouri River deposits, there has been little commercial activity there since the 1990s because of the high cost of recovery and environmental concerns. Production at Dry Cottonwood Creek has been sporadic and low-yielding. The Rock Creek area, also known as Gem Mountain, continues to be the most productive site in Montana, even more so than Yogo Gulch, producing over 190,000,000 carats (38,000,000 g) of sapphires since its inception in 1906. Other than Yogo, Montana sapphire mines have been less successful because they have few blue sapphires and non-blue sapphires have low profit margins.

These gems inspired the names of features: the mountains near Rock Creek are known as the Sapphire Mountains. Garnets are also found at some Montana sapphire sites, inspiring the name of the Garnet Range, which lies to the north of the Sapphire Mountains. In 1969, the sapphire and agate were jointly declared Montana's two official state gemstones.

== History ==
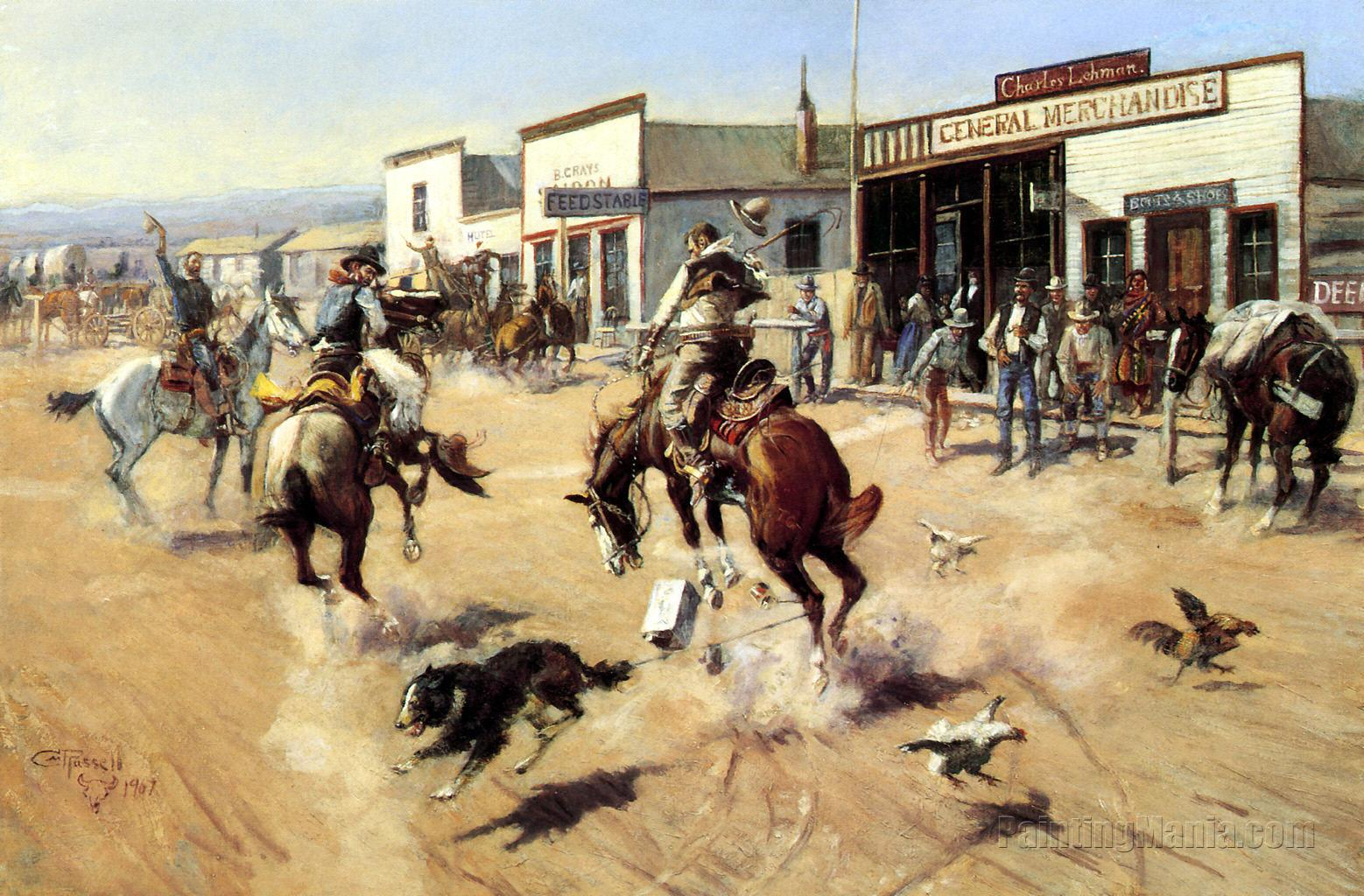
A Quiet Day In Utica by C.M. Russell

Mining of Yogo sapphires was exceptionally difficult and remains sporadic today. Even so, Yogo sapphire mining turned out to be more valuable than several gold strikes. The Yogo area also produced small amounts of silver, copper, and iron.

Yogo Gulch lies in a region originally inhabited by the Piegan Blackfeet people. Gold was first discovered at Yogo Creek in 1866, but the small numbers of early prospectors were driven off by local Native Americans. During a Gold Rush in 1878, about a thousand miners came to Yogo Creek, which was one of the gold-bearing streams in Montana not yet actively mined. "Blue pebbles" were noted along with small quantities of gold. The mining camp at Yogo City only flourished for roughly three years, and eventually the population dwindled to only a few people.

Yogo City was briefly known as Hoover City, after Jake Hoover. Hoover was part of a partnership that had been placer mining for gold and is credited as the discoverer of Yogo Sapphires. For several years, he also owned a ranch in nearby Pig-Eye Basin. He later prospected for gold in Alaska and was a deep-sea fishing guide in Seattle before eventually returning to the Judith Basin. Western painter C.M. Russell arrived in the area in 1880 as a young cowhand and was hired by Hoover. Russell stated that he learned most of his frontier skills from Hoover, and the two men remained lifelong friends. Millie Ringold, a former slave born in 1845, settled in Fort Benton, Montana after having worked as a nurse and servant for an army general. When gold was discovered at Yogo Creek, Ringold sold her boarding house in Fort Benton and left for the Yogo gold fields, setting up a hotel, restaurant, and saloon in Yogo City where she sang and played music. Ringold later cooked for the English mine, but also worked her own gold claims, even after gold mining was on the decline. She was known as a superb cook and ultimately died in Yogo City in 1906, the last resident of the community. The nearby town of Utica was featured in Russell's 1907 painting A Quiet Day In Utica, which was originally known as Tinning a Dog. Hoover, Ringold, store owner Charles Lehman, and Russell himself are all depicted in the painting, placed between the hitching post and door of the general store.

=== Discovery ===
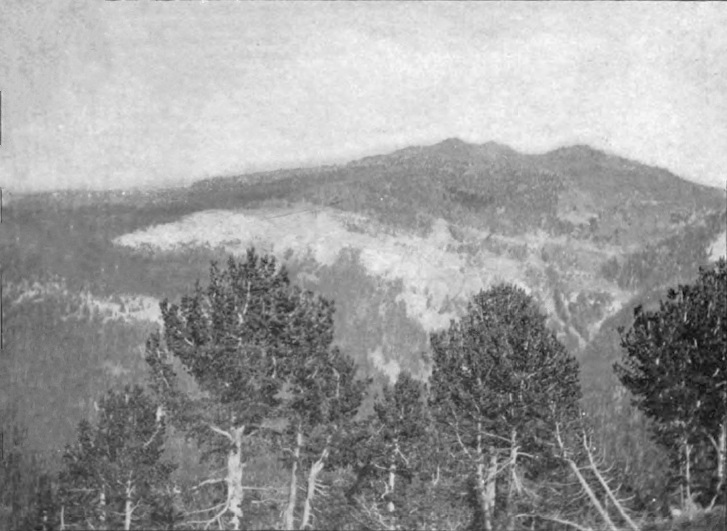
Yogo Peak seen from the Belt Creek Divide, c. 1900

In 1894, the "blue pebbles" were recognized as sapphires. One story credits a local school teacher for recognizing the blue pebbles as sapphires. A variation is that the teacher lived in Maine, but was a friend of a local miner, who had mailed her a small box with some gold and a few "blue pebbles" in it. Another story credits a miner named S.S. Hobson for surmising that the blue stones might be sapphires, and his guess was confirmed by a jeweler in Helena. Ultimately, in 1895, Jake Hoover sent a cigar box containing those he had collected while mining gold to an assay office, which in turn sent them via regular, uninsured mail to Tiffany's in New York City for appraisal by Dr. George Frederick Kunz, the leading American gemologist of the time. Impressed by their quality and color, Kunz pronounced them "the finest precious gemstones ever found in the United States". Tiffany's sent Hoover a check for $3,750 (approximately $150,000 as of 2025), along with a letter that described the blue pebbles as "sapphires of unusual quality".

=== Early mining ===
Yogo sapphires were ultimately traced from the alluvium to their source. In February 1896, a sheepherder named Jim Ettien found the sapphire mother lode: the Yogo dike. Ettien was prospecting for gold, and found sapphires after washing gravel he found in a fissure within a limestone outcrop. Ettien staked two claims. The vein turned out to be 5 miles (8 km) long and several other miners promptly staked claims along it. Ettien sold his claims to Hoover; Hoover in turn sold his interest in eight original mining stakes, known as the "New Mine Sapphire Syndicate", to his two partners for $5,000 (approximately $190,000 as of 2025). This site was 5 miles (8 km) from Yogo City. In 1899, Johnson, Walker and Tolhurst, Ltd. of London purchased the New Mine Sapphire Syndicate for $100,000 (approximately $3.9 million as of 2025). At that point, the operation became unofficially known as the "English Mine".

On July 4, 1896, two other Americans, John Burke and Pat Sweeney, staked six mining claims on the western portion of the Yogo dike—areas Hoover had deemed unfit for mining. These claims were collectively known as the "Fourth of July Claim", and became known as the "American Mine". In 1904, the mine was bought by the American Gem Syndicate, and it sold in 1907 to the American Sapphire Company.

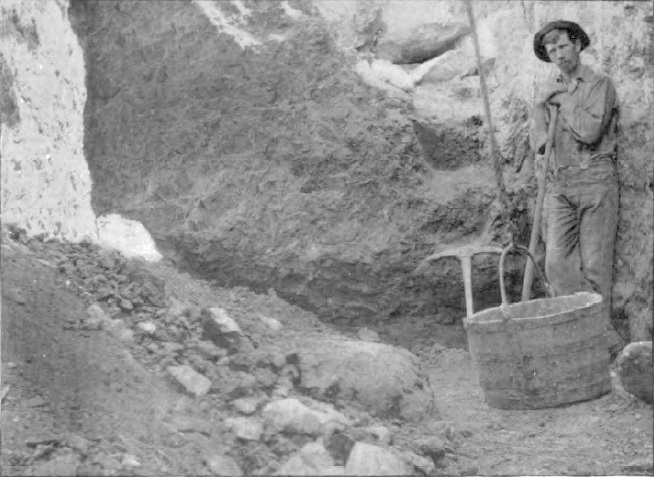
Face of the Yogo dike in open cuttings in 1897

One of the Englishmen who came to the area was Charles Gadsden of Berkhamsted, Hertfordshire. By 1902, Gadsden was promoted to resident supervisor of the English Mine, and he quickly turned its focus from gold to sapphires. Gadsden's security measures were very tight, as weight-for-weight, rough sapphires were and continue to be worth much more than gold. The English Mine flourished until the 1920s, but floods on July 26, 1923, so severely damaged the mines that they never fully recovered. Between the aftermath of flooding and hard economic times, the English Mine finally failed in 1929. It had recovered more than 16 million carats (3.2 t) of rough sapphires that produced 2.5 million carats (500 kg) of finished gems valued at $25 million in 1929 dollars (approximately $470 million as of 2025). A series of other firms mined sapphires there, but with marginal success. For much of the 1930s and 1940s Gadsden worked the mine alone and used his own money to pay its property taxes. He remained caretaker of the mines until shortly before his death on March 11, 1954.

The American Mine operations were less profitable than those of the English Mine. While the English Mine used superior mining and management techniques on a richer lode, the American Mine suffered from insufficient space and lack of water for ore weathering. Roughs from the English Mine were shipped to London and sold in Europe, often with claims they were sapphires from the Far East, while the American Mine had difficulty marketing its gems within the United States. The American Sapphire Company, which used local gemcutters from Great Falls, went bankrupt in 1909; a new firm, the Yogo American Sapphire Company, bought the American Mine, but was bankrupt by 1913. Gadsden and his wife had convinced the New Mine Sapphire Syndicate to buy out the Yogo American Sapphire Company in 1914, and in doing so, the English syndicate gained control of all known Yogo deposits. They quickly recouped the purchase price by washing the tailings left behind by previous operators of the American Mine.

=== 1940s–1970s ===
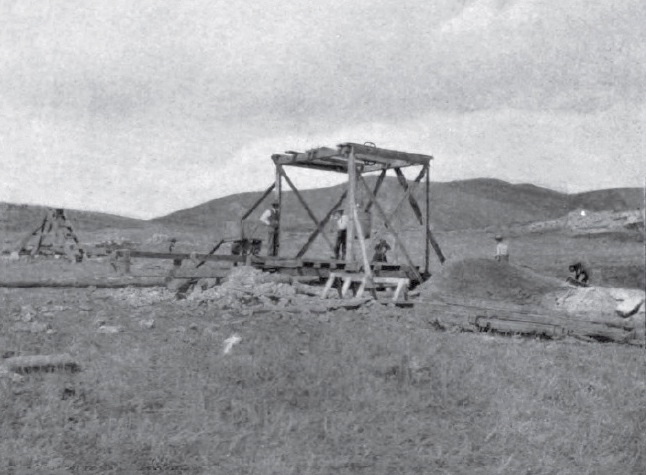
Mine shaft in Yogo Gulch, 1897

Montana sapphires were heavily mined during World War II for industrial abrasive and cutting purposes. As the Yogo mines were still owned by the English, the United States government could not control those operations, so the mines were little affected by the war, even though industrial sapphires were critical to the war effort. The Yogo Sapphire Mining Corporation of Billings, Montana, was the next company to try to run the English Mine. They made an initial offer in 1946, and reached a deal by 1949, but the purchase was not complete until 1956 because of legal issues. The sale was finally completed for $65,000 cash and some stock considerations because the company's capital was exhausted, similar to previous Yogo ventures. The Yogo Sapphire Mining Corporation then changed its name to be the same as the former English firm's name: New Mine Sapphire Syndicate. It became informally known as the "American Syndicate" to distinguish it from the previous "English Syndicate". Production was poor and mining ceased in September 1959. From 1959 to 1963, the mine itself was left unattended and unsecured, resulting in hobbyists, picnickers, and rockhounds' coming from all over the US and Canada to gather loose rough sapphires. The American Syndicate took action to stop this in 1963, with fences and threats of prosecution. The American Syndicate then tried leasing the mine to several operators. One of these was Siskon, Inc. of Nevada, which lost a significant amount of money. They sued, and in May 1965 the Montana Supreme Court ruled in Siskon's favor. Siskon bought the mine at a sheriff's sale and in turn leased it to a group headed by Arnold Baron, who had a background in gemcutting and jewelry. Baron organized German and Thai gemcutters and had success in marketing Yogo sapphires in America—the first such success in 50 years. However, owing to the difficulty in mining the hard rock site, he did not exercise his option to buy the mine, and Siskon sold it in August 1968 to Herman Yaras of Oxnard, California, for $585,000.

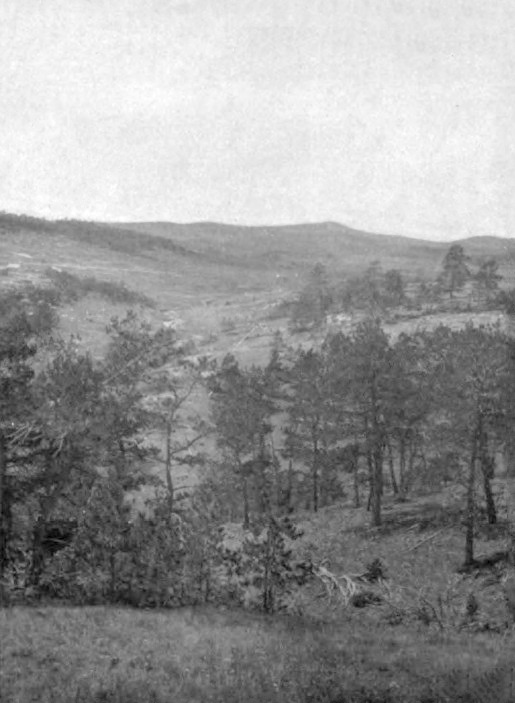
The sapphire-bearing dike on right side of photo, c. 1900

In 1969, Yaras' Sapphire Village, Inc. created the Sapphire Village, a nearby homesite development offering buyers limited mining rights to gather their own sapphires with hand tools. Having done no significant mining or marketing, Sapphire Village, Inc. sold in 1973 to one of its investors, Chikara Kunisaki, a celery farmer from Oxnard, California. Kunisaki renamed the business Sapphire International Corporation and attempted to create a commercial mining operation. He built a modern 3,000-foot (910 m) tunnel at the site of the old American Mine, named the "Kunisaki Tunnel". But operation costs were so high that Sapphire International Corporation shut down in late 1976. This was the last actual attempt to mine the American Mine section of the Yogo dike, and today, only the locked portal to the tunnel still exists.

In January 1977, Victor di Suvero and his firm Sapphire-Yogo Mines became the next owner to tackle the Yogo dike. Di Suvero was a native-born Italian who grew up in Tianjin, China, and had been successful with a jade mine in California. Di Suvero's expertise was in marketing: he formed a company called Sapphire Trading to cut and market the Yogo sapphires. He had novel marketing ideas but was not knowledgeable about the mining side of the business. Unable to make payments, his venture folded in late 1979.

By 1980, only four American owners had been successful at Yogo Gulch, all early in its mining history. The English syndicate had been the most profitable of any venture, and even that venture was short-lived. At least thirteen American-owned Yogo mining efforts had failed. Besides inherent difficulties with financing and the challenges of hard rock mining, the American owners generally did not understand how to effectively market the gems.

=== 1980s and beyond ===
Kunisaki put his mine up for sale, asking $6 million to recoup his expenses. Even though mine profits had been poor over the decades, prices of precious gems were very high at the time due to the worldwide oil crises of the 1970s and early 1980s. Four individuals or groups seriously considered Kunisaki's offer. Relying heavily upon Delmer Brown's expertise, Harry C. Bullock and J. R. Edington formed the limited partnership American Yogo Sapphire Limited, becoming the 14th American company to work the Yogo dike. Bullock and Brown had Yogo mine experience, as they had worked with di Suvero. Bullock's plan included mining, cutting, making jewelry, and marketing—the whole spectrum of the business. They paid the $6 million asked by Kunisaki and then raised another $7.2 million in funding by October 1981. Brown located quality gemcutters in Thailand, and set up the American Yogo Sapphire Company there. Brown also set up a thorough, computerized security system that tracked gems from the mine to the gemcutters. Bigger roughs were sent to American cutters, specialty cuts were done in Germany, a few cuts were done in Hong Kong, and the vast majority were done in Thailand. American Yogo Sapphire Limited secured a $5 million line of credit with Citibank. Desiring a more modern name, American Yogo Sapphire Limited changed its name to Intergem Limited in early 1982. Intergem marketed the Yogo as the "Royal American Sapphire." Their first line of jewelry appeared in mid-1982, first marketed regionally in the American west and later at the national level. Intergem also developed a system of authorized dealers, and found success in its first four years, with sales over $3 million in 1984 alone.

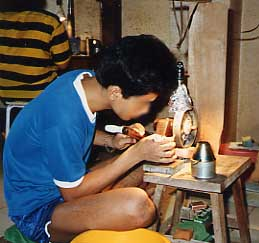
Gemcutting in Thailand

Intergem rocked the gem trade by marketing the Yogo as the world's only guaranteed untreated sapphire. By 1982, the practice of routinely heat treating gems had become a major issue in the industry. At the time, 95 percent of all the world's sapphires were being heated to enhance their natural color. Thai traders had even purchased large quantities of naturally colorless Sri Lankan sapphires, known as geuda, and heated them to turn them into a marketable range of blue colors. Intergem's marketing of guaranteed untreated Yogo sapphires set them against many in the gem industry. In 1985 there was a movement in Pennsylvania to require disclosure that a gem had been treated. Intergem's strategy resulted in large numbers of gem professionals visiting Yogo Gulch.

Intergem began planning to dig even deeper into the Yogo dike, which held more known reserves than all the world's other known sapphire deposits combined, albeit deep underground rather than near the surface in the manner of the other known deposits. They also set up a washing plant and maintenance sheds at the site of the former American mine. Intergem had made a $1.5 million down payment and agreed to make semi-annual payments to Kunisaki's Sapphire International Corporation, which had been renamed to Roncor. Intergem also had loan and interest payments on the $7.2 million loan to make to Citibank. While the company's sales were steadily increasing, their profits were still too low and in May 1985 they missed a $250,000 payment to Roncor. Simultaneously, their collateral of gems, held by Citibank, declined because the value of their collateral was declining; as a result, Citibank called in its loan. Intergem had over $1 million in sales lined up for the 1985 Christmas season, but could only fill a tiny portion because they did not have enough operating capital to manufacture the Yogo jewelry. In mid-1986, Roncor regained full ownership even though Intergem had sold loose gems and jewelry worth millions of dollars.

Various companies attempted to lease the mine from Roncor, but in the meantime, two local couples, Lanny and Joy Perry and Chuck and Marie Ridgeway, discovered a new site at Yogo Gulch in January 1984 by following a trail to an unused section of the dike that had previously been deemed unsuitable. They began mining the site and named it the "Vortex Mine", forming a company named Vortex Mining. The mine shaft was 280 feet (85 m) deep and contained two Yogo ore-bearing veins. The portion of the dike they had mined was an extension of the main dike. The Vortex Mine, renamed Yogo Creek Mining, was successful for years but eventually declined and closed in 2004.

In 1992, Roncor found an 11-carat (2.2 g) rough. AMAX Exploration, operating as the Yogo Sapphire Project, signed a 22-month lease with Roncor in March 1993 and had some success in the middle and eastern portions of the dike; it decided not to continue after the end of its lease due to the cost of underground mining, depletion of easily accessible Yogo sapphires, and the relatively small size of Yogo sapphires then easily accessible. During this time, additional dikes were found in the area using geophysical magnetometer surveys. Low-grade sapphire rough was found in the Eastern Flats Dike, a parallel dike some 500 feet northeast of the main dike. Pacific Cascade Sapphires, a Canadian company, had a mining lease with Roncor in 2000 and 2001 but ran out of funds and their option expired. By this time, most of the easily accessible Yogo sapphires had been mined and miners had to dig deeper, further increasing costs.

In 1995, Intergem's stock of gems began to reappear on the market because the company had paid its salesmen in sapphires during its financial demise. After Intergem collapsed, many of its salesmen continued to sell Yogo sapphires, especially after AMAX ceased operations. Citibank also had obtained a large stock of Yogo sapphires, reputedly worth $3.5 million (approximately $10,477,300 as of 2025), as a result of Intergem's collapse: 200,000 carats (40,000 g) of rough, 22,000 carats (4,400 g) of cut gems, and 2,000 pieces of jewelry, all of which sat in the bank's vaults until 1991 when Sofus Michelsen, director of the Center for Gemstone Evaluation and creator of the Michelsen Gemstone Index, became interested. In 1992, he and Jim Adair, a Missoula, Montana, jeweler who is the world's largest retailer of Yogo sapphires, got together, and by October 1994 Adair had purchased Citibank's four sealed bags of Yogo material. However, only one of the bags was truly valuable. Adair and Michelsen designed custom cutting techniques for Yogo sapphires.

A new owner, Michael Duane Roberts, bought the Vortex Mine in 2008. Its operations were designed to be environmentally friendly, using methods such as recycling all water and not using other chemicals. Roberts died in a mining accident in 2012. As of 2011, there was also mining activity by individual hobby miners on small parcels at Sapphire Village, but the Roncor mines remained inactive. In 2017, Vortex Mines was sold to Don Baide who plans to continue operations.

== Notable specimens ==
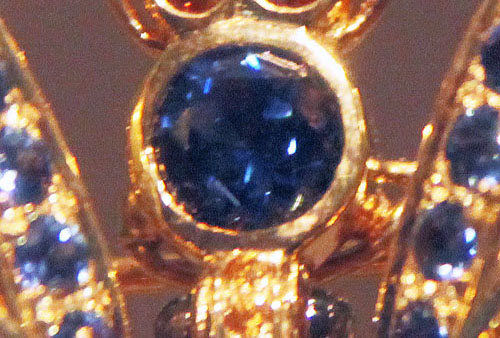
Large blue Yogo sapphire in the head of the Conchita Sapphire Butterfly, created in 2007, currently held by the Smithsonian Institution

Several Yogo sapphires are kept at the Smithsonian Institution. The earliest donations were noted in the museum's annual report on June 30, 1899, when the institution reported that Dr. L. T. Chamberlain gave them two cut Yogo sapphires and 21 other sapphires for their Dr. Isaac Lea gem and mineral collection. The record-setting 10.2-carat (2.04 g) cut Yogo is also held by the Smithsonian. In 2006, gemologist Robert Kane of Fine Gems International in Helena, donated 333 Montana sapphires, weighing a total of 27.07 carats (5.414 g), to the Smithsonian's Gem and Mineral Collection, along with 98.48 grams of 18K yellow gold for the creation of a piece of jewelry. A representative of the Smithsonian asked Paula Crevoshay, a jewelry designer from Albuquerque, New Mexico, to create a piece of finished jewelry from these gems. Crevoshay felt that a butterfly motif would best represent America's natural beauty, honor her mother's love of butterflies, and display the wide range of colors found in Montana sapphires. Crevoshay named the brooch "Conchita" in honor of her mother; it is also referred to as the "Sapphire Butterfly Brooch", "Conchita Sapphire Butterfly", and the "Montana Butterfly Brooch". Two of the sapphires used are cabochon cut and the rest are brilliant cut. The majority are from the Rock Creek deposit. The largest one, however, is a blue Yogo used for the butterfly's head. Other sapphires used included yellow, purple, pink, and orange gems. Crevoshay completed the brooch in 2007; she and Kane presented the finished brooch to Smithsonian curator Jeffrey Post on May 7, 2007, in Washington, DC.

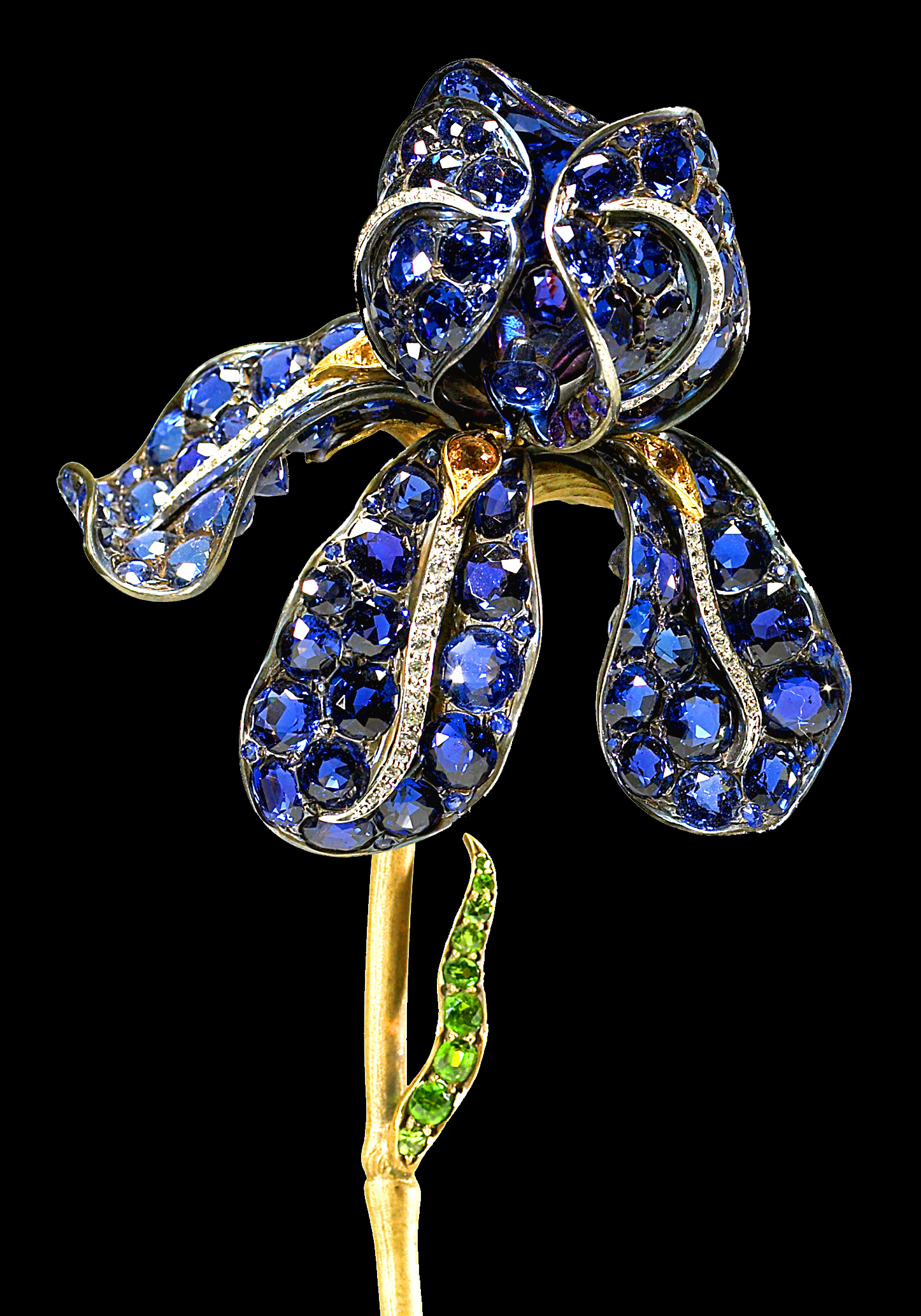
Detail of the Tiffany Iris Brooch by Paulding Farnham c. 1900, currently held by the Walters Art Museum

In the earliest years of Yogo sapphire mining, before Yogo sapphires achieved their own reputation, Oriental sapphires were sold in Montana with claims they were Yogo sapphires, while in Europe, Yogo sapphires were sold as Oriental sapphires. However, Yogo sapphires became notable in their own right. Paulding Farnham (1859–1927) used Yogo sapphires in several jewelry pieces he designed for the 1900 Exposition Universelle in Paris, where Yogo sapphires received a silver medal among all gems for color and clarity. An entry of uncut loose Yogo sapphires also won a bronze medal at the 1904 Louisiana Purchase Exposition in St. Louis, Missouri. Farnham was the creator of the most elaborate piece of jewelry ever made with Yogo sapphires, the life-size Tiffany Iris Brooch, a brooch ornament, which contains 120 Yogo sapphires set in platinum, and sold on March 17, 1900, for $6,906.84. In 1923, First Lady Florence Harding was given an "all Montana" ring made from a Yogo sapphire and Montana gold. In 1952, Gadsden gave cut Yogo sapphires to President Harry Truman, his wife Bess, and their daughter Margaret. Many Yogo sapphires were also sold in Europe, as some Yogo mining was conducted by British interests. Yogo sapphires may have been in the personal collections of some members of the British royal family in the 1910s, but promotional claims that Yogo sapphires are in any of the crown jewels of England cannot be conclusively proven or disproven. Claims that the gem in the engagement ring of Lady Diana Spencer and Catherine Middleton is a Yogo are dubious; the gem is thought to be of Sri Lankan origin. The story that the gem is a Yogo can be traced to a 1984 Los Angeles Times article that described the ring as a 9-carat (1.8 g) sapphire, and quoted Intergem president Dennis Brown's claim that the gem may have come from a British-owned Yogo mine.
