= Millie Ringold =

African American gold prospector

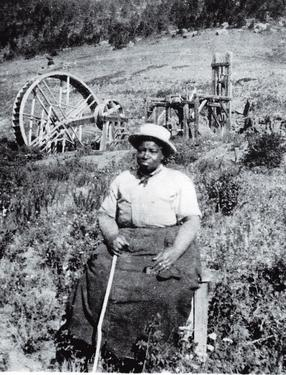
- Born: 1845; Virginia, United States
- Died: 1906 (aged 60–61); Yogo, Montana
- Resting place: Utica Cemetery, Utica, Montana
- Occupations: Proprietor, gold prospector, nurse

Millie Ringold (1845 - 1906) (also known as Millie Ringgold) was an African American gold prospector and boarding house proprietor in Yogo, Montana in the United States. She was the last recorded resident of Yogo, a mining district in the Little Belt Mountains known for Yogo sapphires.

== Early life ==
Ringold was born enslaved in either Maryland or Virginia in the United States in 1845. In 1863, when she was around 18, President Abraham Lincoln issued the emancipation proclamation, which freed slaves in the American South.

By the 1870s, she was working as a nurse and servant for a U.S. Army General. She stayed in Fort Benton, Montana after the general was transferred, working as a local entrepreneur and boarding house proprietor.

== Gold prospecting ==
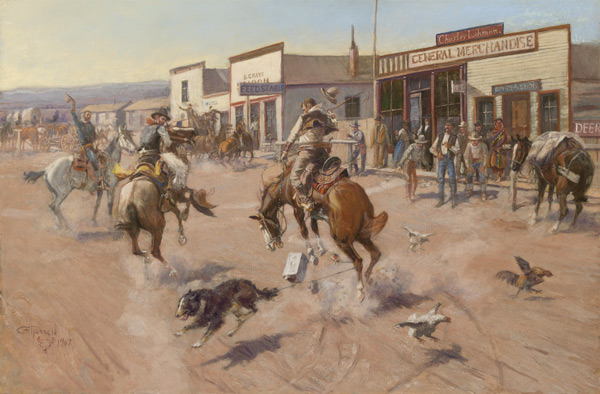
Charles Marion Russell's painting A Quiet Day in Utica, which features Millie Ringold stood in front of Lehman's General Store.

Ringold is thought to have arrived in Yogo in 1879 after the discovery of gold nearby kicked off a gold rush in the Little Belt Mountains. She reportedly arrived with a wagon, two condemned Army mules, and $1,600 that she used to establish a hotel, restaurant, and saloon in the area where she sang and played music.

The rush lasted only until 1883, when it is reported that most miners left the area, but Ringold stayed.

After her death in December 1906, Ringold was buried 23 miles away at Utica Cemetery in Utica, Montana despite her wishes to be buried in Yogo City. Her grave had originally been marked with a wooden cross but this cross had decayed over time. In September 2023, a headstone inscribed with the words 'last resident of Yogo Town' was placed above her grave after it had been relocated using radar technology, aided by the fact that it was known she was buried in a piano box.

Artist of the American Old West Charles Marion Russell painted A Quiet Day in Utica in 1907, a year after Millie Ringold had died. According to an article from the Sid Richardson Museum, as a tribute, she is featured in the painting standing in front of Lehman's General Store. The painting also is said to feature Millie's five gallon coal oil can, which she drummed while singing songs.
