= Utica, Montana =

- Unincorporated community
- Location within Montana Location within the United States
- Coordinates: 46°58′04″N 110°05′37″W
- Country: United States
- State: Montana
- County: Judith Basin County

Area
  - Total: 0.25 sq mi (0.65 km^{2})
  - Land: 0.25 sq mi (0.65 km^{2})
  - Water: 0 sq mi (0.00 km^{2})
- Elevation: 4,475 ft (1,364 m)

Population (2020)
  - Total: 23
  - Density: 92.2/sq mi (35.58/km^{2})
- FIPS code: 30-76075
- GNIS feature ID: 2806634

Utica is an unincorporated community in west-central Judith Basin County, Montana, United States. As of the 2020 census, Utica had a population of 23. It is approximately 40 miles (64 km) from Lewistown at the intersections of Pig Eye Road, Montana Route 239 (the "Utica highway"), and Montana Route 541. Yogo sapphires were found near Utica in the mid-1890s.

Judith River Ranger Station is near town.

== Notable residents ==
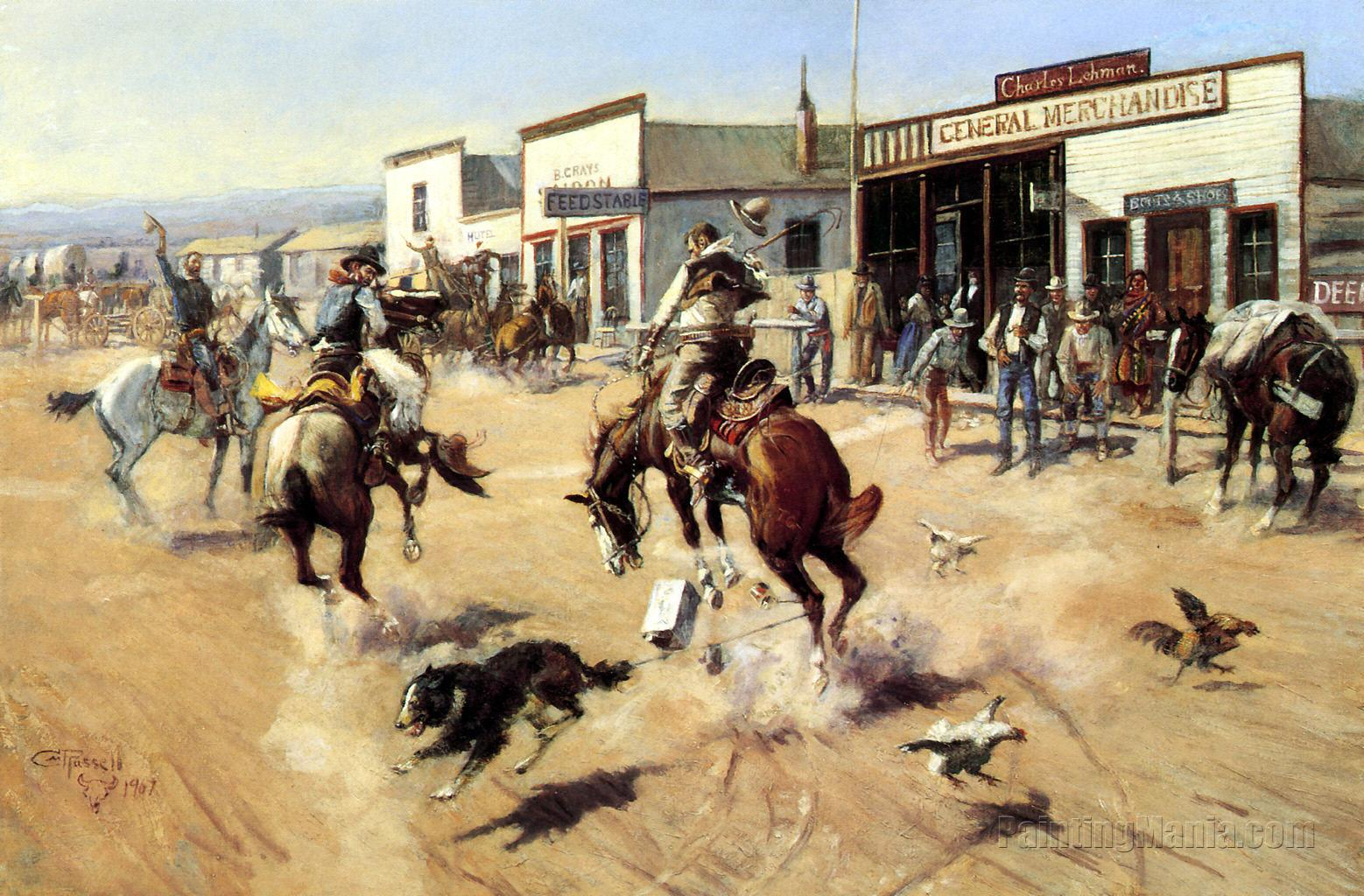
A Quiet Day In Utica by C.M. Russell

One of Utica's most famous local residents was the western painter C.M. Russell, who at the time was a young cowhand hired by a local rancher and gold miner named Jake Hoover. Russell stated that he learned most of his frontier skills from Hoover, and the two men remained lifelong friends. He featured Utica in the 1907 painting A Quiet Day In Utica, which was originally known as Tinning a Dog. Hoover; local businesswoman Millie Ringold, a former slave; store owner Charles Lehman and Russell himself are all depicted in the painting, seen standing between the hitching post and door of the general store.

== Demographics ==
Historical population
| Census | Pop. | Note | %± |
|---|---|---|---|
| 2020 | 23 | | — |
U.S. Decennial Census
