= Paulding Farnham =

American jewelry designer

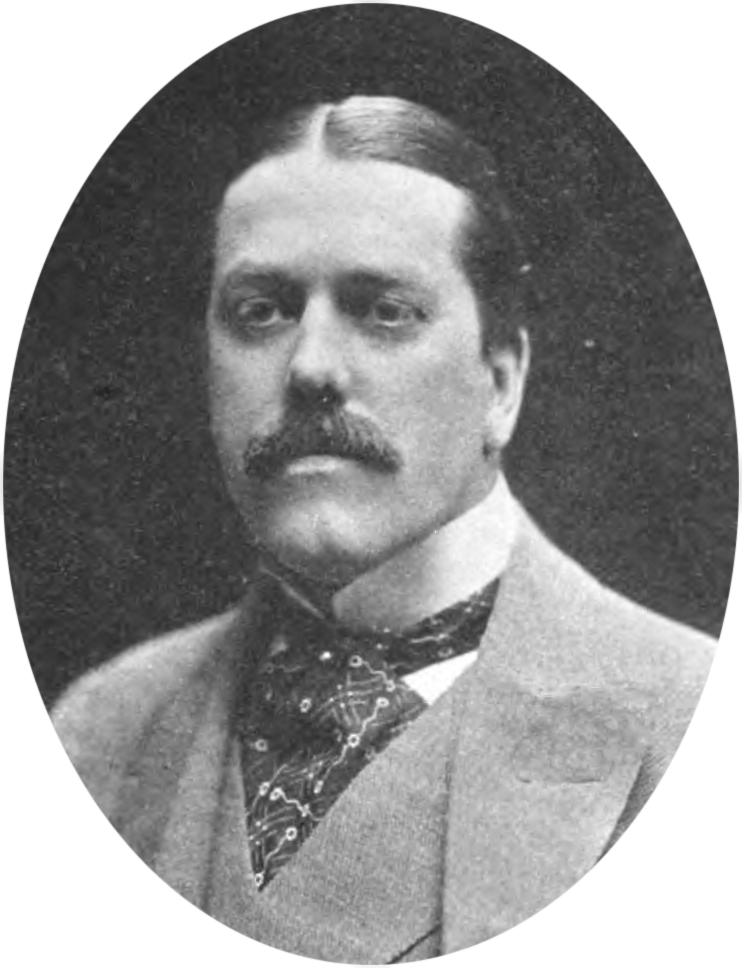
- Farnham in 1900.
- Born: November 6, 1859; New York City, U.S.
- Died: August 10, 1927 (aged 67); Santa Clara, California, U.S.
- Known for: Jewelry, sculpture
- Spouse: Sally James Farnham (1896–1915) (divorced)
- Parents: George Farnham; Julia Paulding

George Paulding Farnham (1859–1927) was an American jewelry designer, sculptor and metallurgist who worked for Tiffany & Co. in the late 19th and early 20th century. Farnham married American sculptor Sally James Farnham in 1896. After leaving Tiffany & Co. in 1908, Farnham focused his interests on developing mining properties in British Columbia.

== Family and early life ==
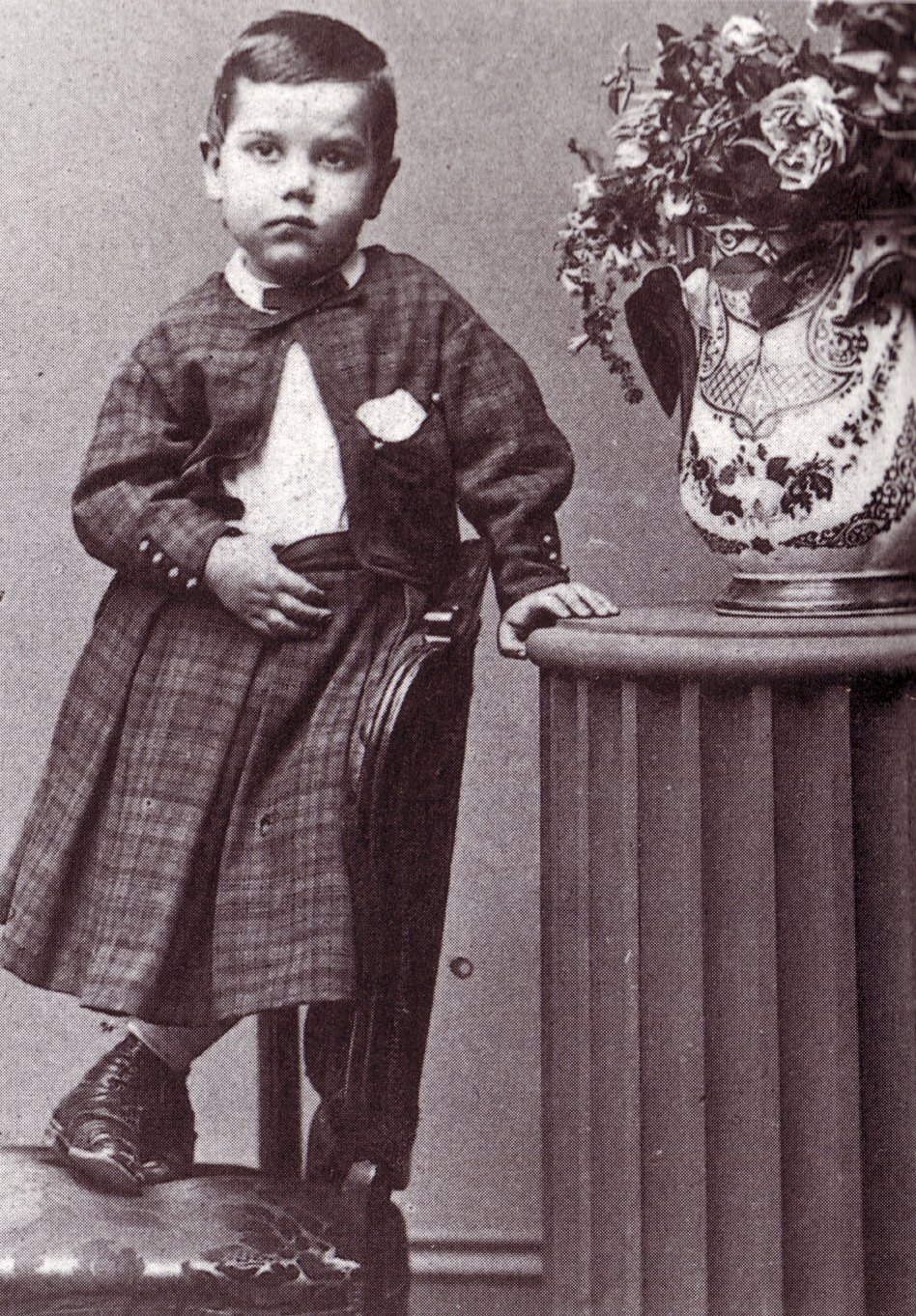
Paulding Farnham at age 4 in 1864.

George Paulding Farnham was born on November 6, 1859, in New York City to George and Julia (née Paulding) Farnham. The family lived at 171 Sullivan Street (now 24 Charlton Street) in Hudson Square until they moved to Elizabeth, New Jersey, in 1866. The Farnhams had a long history in the United States with George Farnham's ancestors emigrating in 1644 from Kenilworth, England. His mother Julia (1838–1897) was a descendant of John Paulding, a Revolutionary War militiaman that had a role in the capture of the British spy Major John André and her father was a close friend of Washington Irving. She was also a sister-in-law of Senator Chauncey Depew. George Farnham's occupation at the time of the 1880 US census was listed as "broker." Farnham's aunt, Eleanor M. Paulding, married Charles Thomas Cook, vice president and eventual president of Tiffany & Co. Aware of his nephew's artistic abilities, Cook used his influence at Tiffany & Co. to secure a position for young Farnham.

Called Paul or Paulding during his lifetime, Farnham began an apprenticeship around 1879 at chief Tiffany & Co. designer Edward C. Moore's studio. His first recorded work was a life-size gold and yellow diamond brooch sculpted in the shape of a Japanese chrysanthemum. The apprenticeship officially ended on November 1, 1885, and Farnham was offered a $55 per week position as general assistant to Moore.

== Career at Tiffany and Co. ==
Paulding Farnham worked for Tiffany & Co. for 23 years, from 1885 to 1908.

=== 1885–1890 ===
Farnham continued to work in Charles Moore's department at Tiffany's and his efforts in the late 1880s were predominantly devoted to designing jewelry for the upcoming Paris Exposition in the summer and fall of 1889. Farnham's salary increased from $65 per week in 1886 to $77 per week in 1887. He became a board member in June 1888 and received a weekly salary of $77 by the end of the year. He had rooms at 142 East Eighteenth Street within the Stuyvesant Flats apartment complex, the first apartment building in Manhattan that catered to the middle classes.

==== 1889 Paris Exposition ====
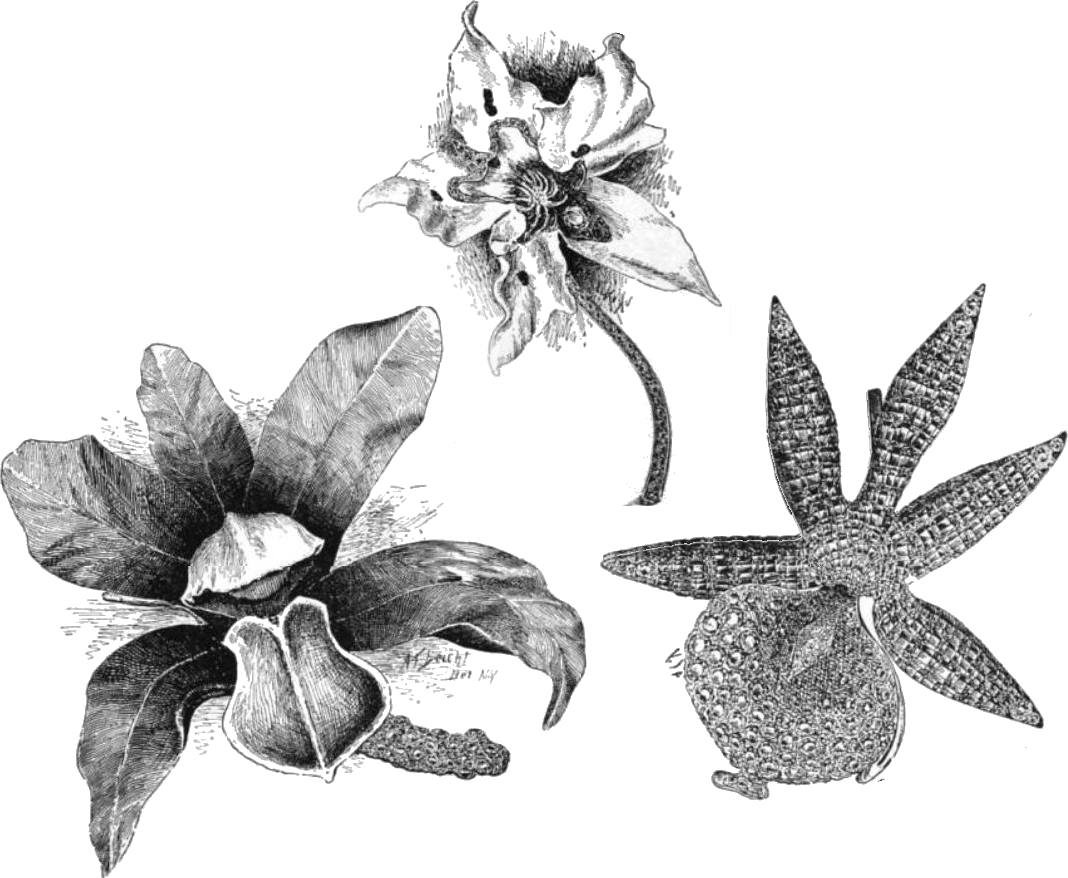
Orchid brooches exhibited at 1889 Paris Exposition, clockwise from top: Odontoglossum sp., Angraecum eburneum and Cattleya bicolor.

The Exposition Universelle was held in Paris from May 6 to October 31, 1889, and coincided with the 100th anniversary of the storming of the Bastille during the French Revolution. Farnham created approximately 24 life-size orchids composed of enamel, silver and green gold that were accented with pearls and gemstones. The flowers were created by molding unannealed silver into the exact shape of the flower in life and coating the form in specially blended and prepared shades of enamel. A surviving example of this group is a brooch modeled after Oncidium jonesianum, a rare species of orchid, now in the collection of the Metropolitan Museum of Art, which notes the jewel’s botanical accuracy. The enamel designs were adapted from Charles Moore’s Orientalist Saracenic silverware patterns. Farnham's collection received a gold medal in the jewelry division at the Exposition. In the report of the United States Commission to the Exposition, the orchid brooches were called "one of the most striking features of the entire Exposition." The Paris Herald praised the collection for its "boldness and originality of design" and the Jeweler's Circular complemented Farnham "to whose genius the [United States] (Note: The original text said "country.") is indebted." Other jewelry pieces had design patterns that were reminiscent of basket-weaving patterns utilized by various Native American tribes, including the Sioux, Navaho and Inuit cultures. After the Exposition in 1890, Farnham designed more varieties of the orchid brooches for the private market that were sold at the New York store.

=== 1891–1900 ===
Following his success at the 1889 Exposition, Farnham was promoted to assistant secretary in 1891. His mentor, Charles Moore, died early in 1891 and Farnham replaced him as head of the jewelry department. Important projects included pieces designed for the 1893 World's Columbian Exposition and 1900 Paris Exposition as well as private commissions such as the Belmont Cup, Dewey sword and Adams Vase. Paulding Farnham continued to receive accolades for his designs and continued to have creative influence at the company.

From 1891 until his marriage to Sally James in 1896, Farnham lived at the Union League Club located at 431 Fifth Avenue, a location a short distance from Bryant Park. His parents died within a year of each other, his father dying of heat exhaustion in August 1896 and his mother dying of a stroke nine months later in May 1897. On June 26, 1896, Farnham was injured along with three other people in a cable car at the intersection of Broadway and 23rd Street. Farnham sustained non-life-threatening injuries, cutting his mouth and breaking a tooth.

==== The Belmont Cup ====
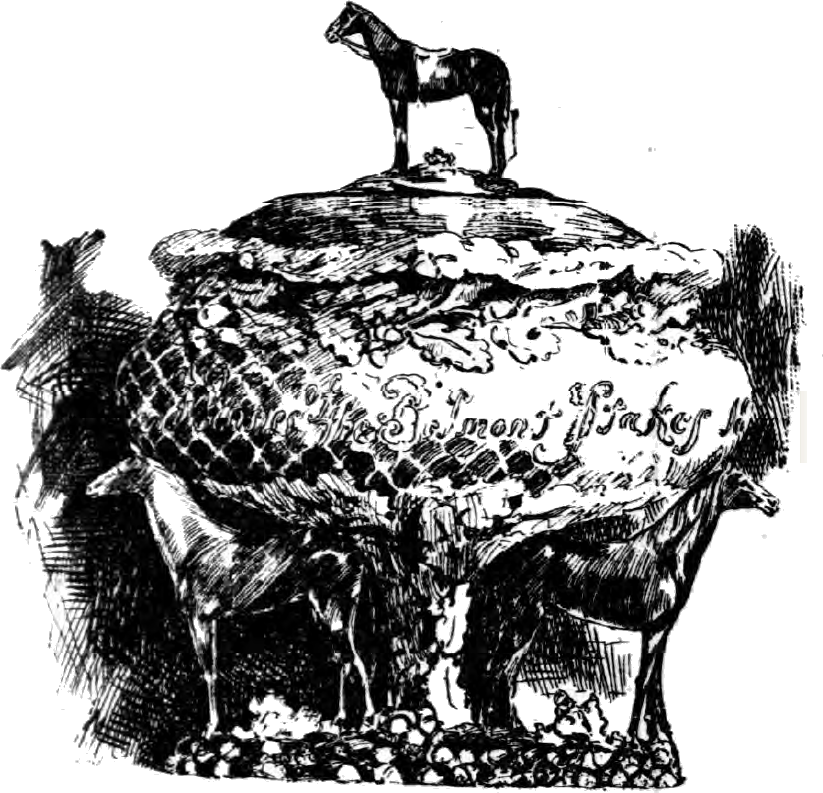
Anonymous artist's rendition of the Belmont Cup, 1896. The trophy was designed by Paulding Farnham at the behest of August Belmont Jr.

Tiffany & Co. was commissioned by August Belmont Jr. in 1896 to create a silver cup in memory of his late father August Belmont, the namesake of the Belmont Stakes, to be presented to the winner of the 1896 event. Using 350 ounces of sterling silver, Farnham crafted a 27-inch high, acorn-shaped bowl supported by a pedestal composed of three Thoroughbred horse statues representing the foundation stallions Eclipse, Matchem and Herod. The large bowl had a prominent acorn and oak motif symbolizing the development of modern racing Thoroughbreds from the three foundation sires and the lid was crowned with a statue of the elder Belmont's racehorse Fenian who secured Belmont's first win in the Belmont Stakes in 1869. Plans for the cup were unveiled on June 2, the day of the running at Morris Park Racecourse, while the cup was finished the following year in 1897. The cup cost $1,000 to create and augmented the $4,000 in prize money given to the race winner. August Belmont Jr. won the Cup when Hastings won the race. The Belmont family kept the trophy until 1926 when it was presented to Belmont Park and has been ceremonially distributed every year to the winner of the Belmont Stakes. Paulding Farnham made several additional Belmont Stakes trophies that were distributed from 1897 to 1907.

For the 1897 trophy, a statue of August Belmont Jr. with Henry of Navarre, Farnham spent a month at Belmont's Nursery Stud in Kentucky to ensure his portrayal of the celebrated racehorse was accurate. Commentary in The Sun praised the likeness as "marvelously accurate," with Belmont later commissioning a copy for himself from the same mold.

==== 1900 Paris Exposition ====
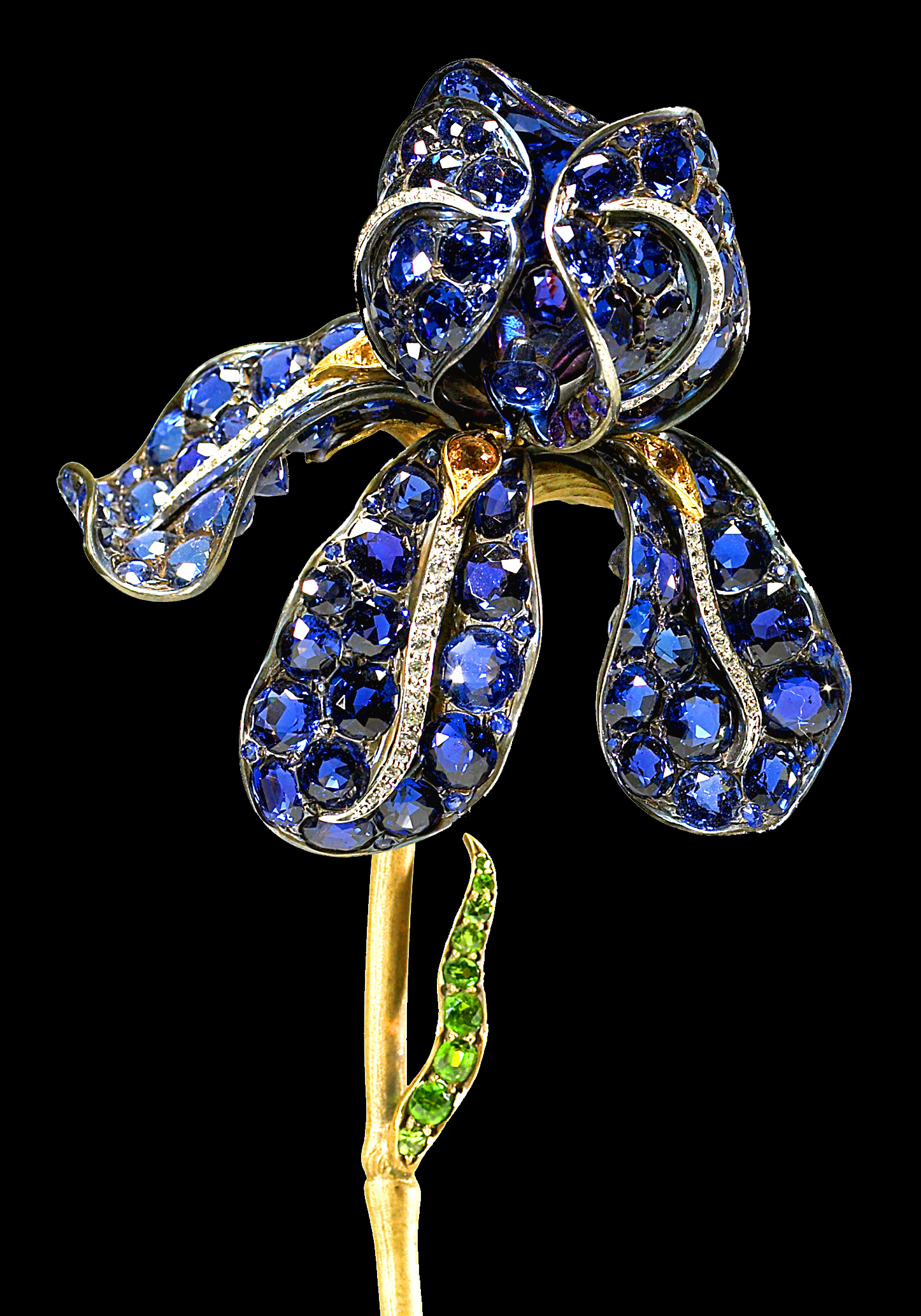
Iris Corsage Ornament, a Yogo sapphire brooch made for the 1900 Exposition

The 1900 Exposition Universelle was held in Paris between April 15 and November 12, 1900. Farnham designed a life-size iris brooch composed of 120 Yogo sapphires and accented with diamonds, topaz and garnets inset in platinum. The gemstones were selected by Tiffany’s gem expert George Frederick Kunz. The brooch was purchased by American collector Henry Walters for $6,906.84 (comparable to $267,301 today) during the Exposition and the brooch is currently in the collection of the Walters Art Museum.

== Mining exploits and later life ==
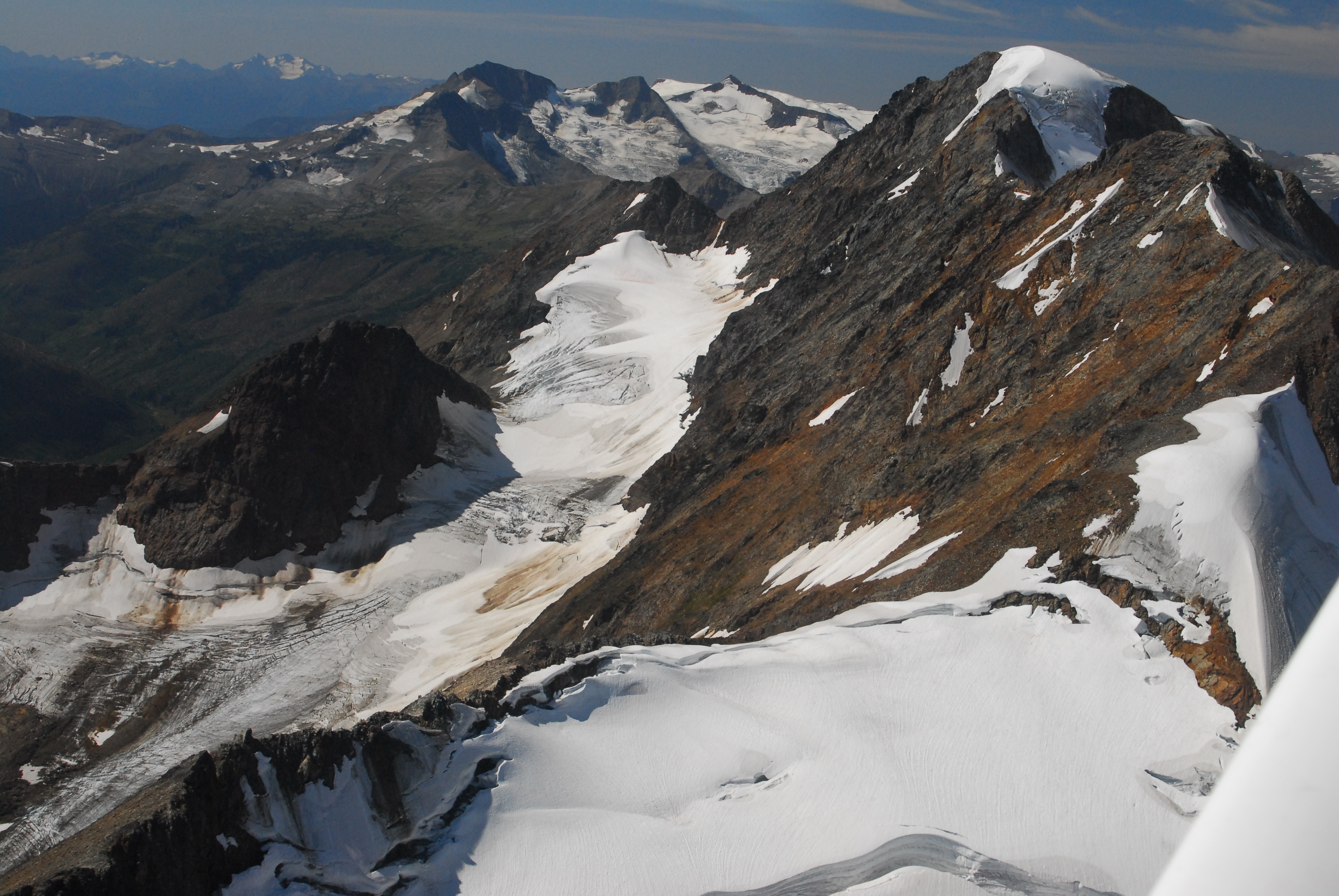
Mount Farnham in the Purcell Mountains.

Paulding Farnham began investing in mining opportunities in the vicinity of Windermere, British Columbia, in 1898. Called the Ptarmigan Mines or the "Red Line," the Selkirk and Purcell mountain ranges were noted for rich copper, gold and silver deposits. In 1901, Farnham purchased land in Windermere at the foot of the mountain range, where he built a ranch house. The ranch was near the tallest mountain in the Selkirk range, named Mount Farnham in 1911 in honor of Farnham, which rises to 3,468 m at its peak and has a prominent smokestack-like, 3353 m projection at one end called Farnham Tower. By 1911, Farnham had almost exhausted his personal fortune in an effort to keep the failing mine running. It was said of Farnham that he "[stood] out like his mountain among mining men in this – he lost his fortune like a man and paid every cent he owed."

=== Maritime paintings ===
From 1912 to 1926, Farnham created a series of twelve oil paintings on wood panels entitled Ancient Ships of the Merchant Marine that Opened the Commerce of the World. The series depicted the development of maritime commerce from Phoenician to modern times. The depictions of the boats were lauded for their detail and regarded as accurate by the press. Each painting was created on wood indigenous to the region of the depicted ship. The entire, completed collection was exhibited at the Corcoran Gallery in Washington, D.C. in April 1924 and at the Philadelphia Sesquicentennial Exposition in May 1926. Farnham called the collection "the most complete of the historic maritime pictures ever displayed." The entire nineteen painting series (Farnham only exhibited twelve of the series) was owned by New York art dealer Max Williams after the exhibition and was sold for $2,300 after Williams death in 1930. The collection is currently housed at the University of Pittsburgh Art Gallery.

Farnham lived in California for the remainder of his life and died on August 10, 1927, in Santa Clara.

== Personal life ==
Farnham married Sarah Welles James, the daughter of noted lawyer Colonel Edward C. James, on December 31, 1896. The couple moved in with Julia Farnham at her newly built shore-side home, called "Stepping Stone" in Great Neck, Long Island. The marriage produced three children, two sons James (born January 10, 1898) and John (born July 5, 1907) and a daughter named Julia (born November 27, 1900). After Paulding Farnham left Tiffany & Co. in 1908, he spent more time away from his family to pursue mining opportunities in the western United States and Canada. In 1912, he moved to California permanently, leaving Sally and his three children in New York. Sally Farnham filed for divorce on July 27, 1914, citing "desertion" as the justification and the divorce was officially granted on August 2, 1915.

== Bibliography ==
- Loring, John (2000). Paulding Farnham: Tiffany's lost genius. New York: Harry N. Abrams. ISBN 978-0-8109-3511-2.

Media related to Paulding Farnham at Wikimedia Commons
