= Farnham Group =

Mountains in British Columbia, Canada

- Location within British Columbia

Highest point
- Peak: Mount Farnham
- Elevation: 3,493 m (11,460 ft)
- Coordinates: 50°29′20″N 116°29′13″W

Geography
- Country: Canada
- Province: British Columbia
- Parent range: Purcell Mountains

The Farnham Group is a sub-range of the Purcell Mountains, containing the highest summit of that range, Mount Farnham.
