= Mount Farnham =

Mountain in British Columbia, Canada

- Location within British Columbia

Highest point
- Elevation: 3,493 m (11,460 ft); Ranked 40th in Canada
- Prominence: 2,123 m (6,965 ft); Ranked 26th in Canada
- Listing: Mountains of British Columbia; North America prominent 82nd; Canada highest major peaks 41st; Canada most prominent 31st
- Coordinates: 50°29′20″N 116°29′13″W

Geography
- Country: Canada
- Province: British Columbia
- District: Kootenay Land District
- Parent range: Farnham Group
- Topo map: NTS 82K8 Toby Creek

Climbing
- First ascent: 1914 A. H. & E. L. MacCarthy, Conrad Kain

Mount Farnham is British Columbia's 17th highest peak, and 21st most prominent. It was named after Paulding Farnham from New York. It is the highest peak in the Purcells (a subset of the larger Columbia mountain range).

== See also ==
- List of mountains of Canada
- Geography of British Columbia
- List of ultras of North America
