= Dry Cottonwood Creek (Deer Lodge County, Montana) =

Stream in Montana

Location
- Location: Deer Lodge County, Montana

Physical characteristics
- Source
  - coordinates: 46°12′39″N 112°39′01″W
- Mouth
  - coordinates: 46°14′40″N 112°45′03″W
  - elevation: 4,705 feet (1,434 m)

Basin features
- River system: Columbia River

Dry Cottonwood Creek is a creek in Deer Lodge County, Montana. Approximately 10 miles (16 km) long, it flows northwest out of the southern reaches of the Boulder Mountains into the Clark Fork river near Deer Lodge, Montana. Sapphires are found along this creek.
