= Avalanche Mountain =

Mountain in British Columbia, Canada

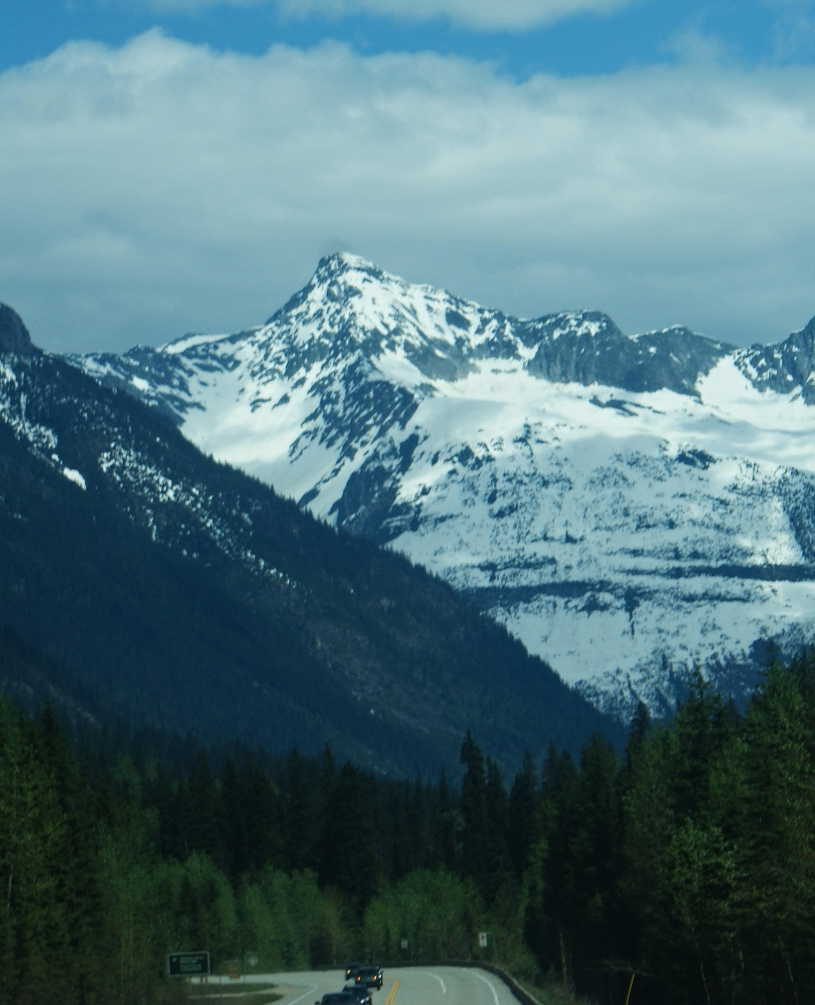
- Avalanche Mountain (west face) seen from the Trans-Canada Highway

Highest point
- Elevation: 2,861 m (9,386 ft)
- Prominence: 280 m (920 ft)
- Parent peak: Uto Peak (2927 m)
- Listing: Mountains of British Columbia
- Coordinates: 51°17′17″N 117°28′10″W

Geography
- Location within British Columbia Location within Canada
- Interactive map of Avalanche Mountain
- Location: British Columbia, Canada
- District: Kootenay Land District
- Parent range: Sir Donald Range; Selkirk Mountains
- Topo map: NTS 82N6 Blaeberry

Climbing
- First ascent: 1885 John Macoun, James M. Macoun
- Easiest route: Scrambling YDS 3

Avalanche Mountain is a 2,861-metre (9,386-foot) summit in Glacier National Park in the Selkirk Mountains in British Columbia, Canada. Its nearest higher peak is Mount Macdonald, 2.2 km (1.4 mi) to the north. Mount Sir Donald is 3.83 km (2.38 mi) to the southeast, and Eagle Peak is 1.46 km (0.91 mi) to the south-southeast. The Avalanche Glacier is situated on the east side of the peak, and the Connaught Tunnel lies partially beneath Avalanche Mountain. The peak is visible from eastbound Highway 1, the Trans-Canada Highway approaching Rogers Pass. During winter and spring of each year the western slope, named Avalanche Crest, generates avalanches which can threaten the highway.

== History ==
The mountain's name was applied by Major A.B. Rogers and stems from its history of avalanches from its western slopes onto Rogers Pass.

In 1881, Rogers and some of his party climbed to the crest of the ridge between Avalanche and Mount Macdonald, and may have climbed Avalanche itself. The first confirmed ascent of the mountain was made in 1885 by John Macoun and James M. Macoun.

On July 8, 1908, while participating in an Alpine Club of Canada camp, Helen Hatch died during an ascent of the northwest face. She was the first fatality in the history of the club.

The 1910 Rogers Pass avalanche, the deadliest avalanche in Canadian history, was caused by an Avalanche originating from Avalanche Mountain. It resulted in the deaths of 62 Canadian Pacific Railway workers and was the impetus for the CPR to build the Connaught Tunnel.

The mountain's name was officially adopted in 1931 when approved by the Geographical Names Board of Canada.

== Climate ==
Based on the Köppen climate classification, Avalanche Mountain is located in a subarctic climate zone with cold, snowy winters and mild summers. Temperatures can drop below −20 °C with wind chill factors below −30 °C. Precipitation runoff from the mountain drains west into the Illecillewaet River or east into the Beaver River.

== See also ==
- Geography of British Columbia

== Gallery ==
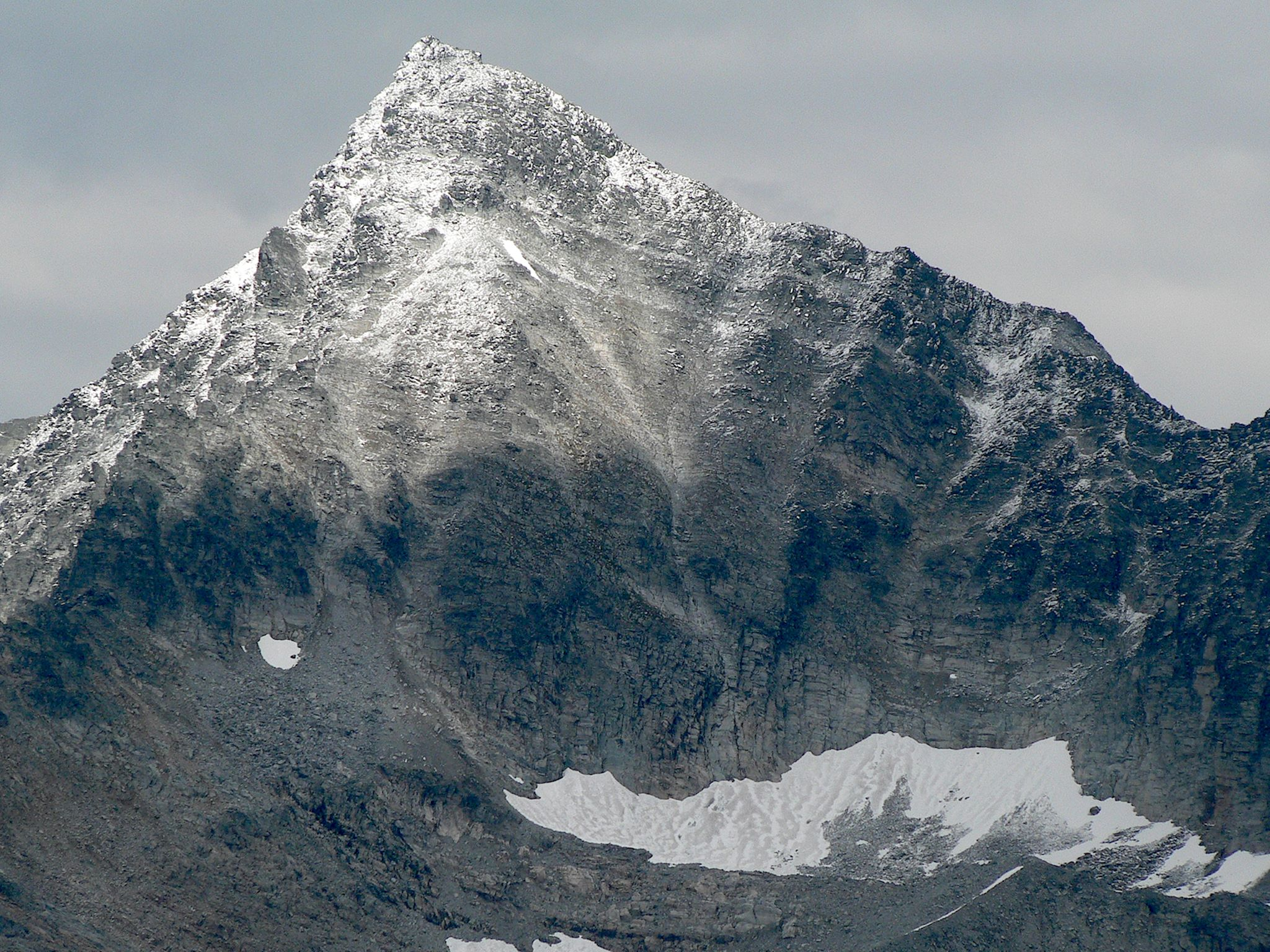
Avalanche Mountain close-up

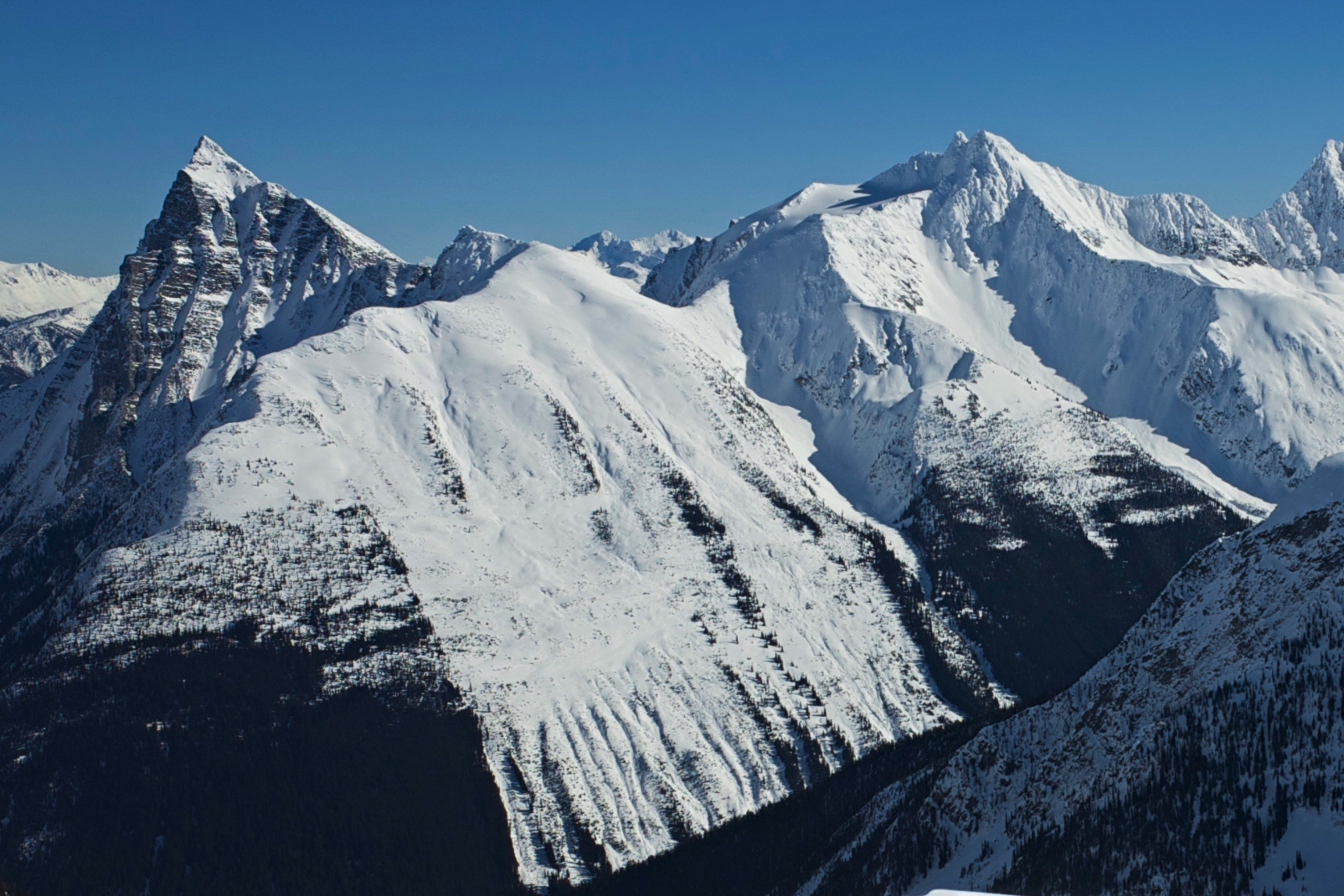
Mt. Macdonald (left) seen with Avalanche Mountain (right)
