= Eagle Peak (British Columbia) =

Mountain in British Columbia, Canada

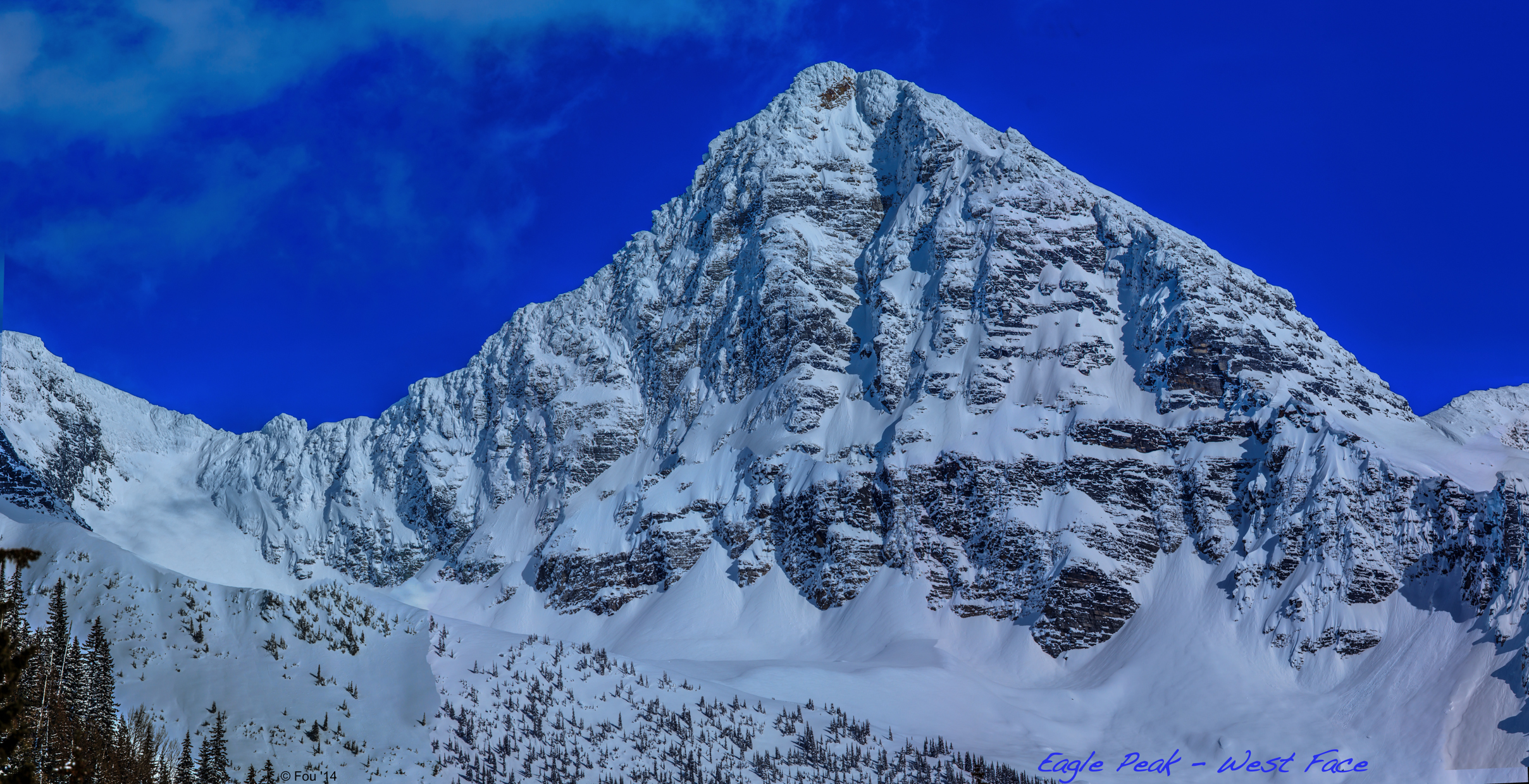
- Eagle Peak (west face) seen from the Trans-Canada Highway

Highest point
- Elevation: 2,846 m (9,337 ft)
- Prominence: 166 m (545 ft)
- Parent peak: Uto Peak (2927 m)
- Listing: Mountains of British Columbia
- Coordinates: 51°16′36″N 117°27′35″W

Geography
- Location within British Columbia Location within Canada
- Interactive map of Eagle Peak
- Location: British Columbia, Canada
- District: Kootenay Land District
- Parent range: Duncan Ranges → Selkirk Mountains
- Topo map: NTS 82N6 Blaeberry

Climbing
- First ascent: 1893 Samuel E.S. Allen, Walter D Wilcox
- Easiest route: Scramble YDS 3

Eagle Peak, is a 2,846-metre (9,337-foot) mountain summit located in Glacier National Park in the Selkirk Mountains in British Columbia, Canada. Its nearest higher peak is Uto Peak, 1.0 km (0.62 mi) to the east. Mount Sir Donald is 2.0 km (1.2 mi) to the southeast, and Mount Macdonald 4.0 km (2.5 mi) to the north. The Avalanche Glacier is situated on the northeast side of the peak. The peak is visible from eastbound Highway 1, the Trans-Canada Highway approaching Rogers Pass.

== History ==
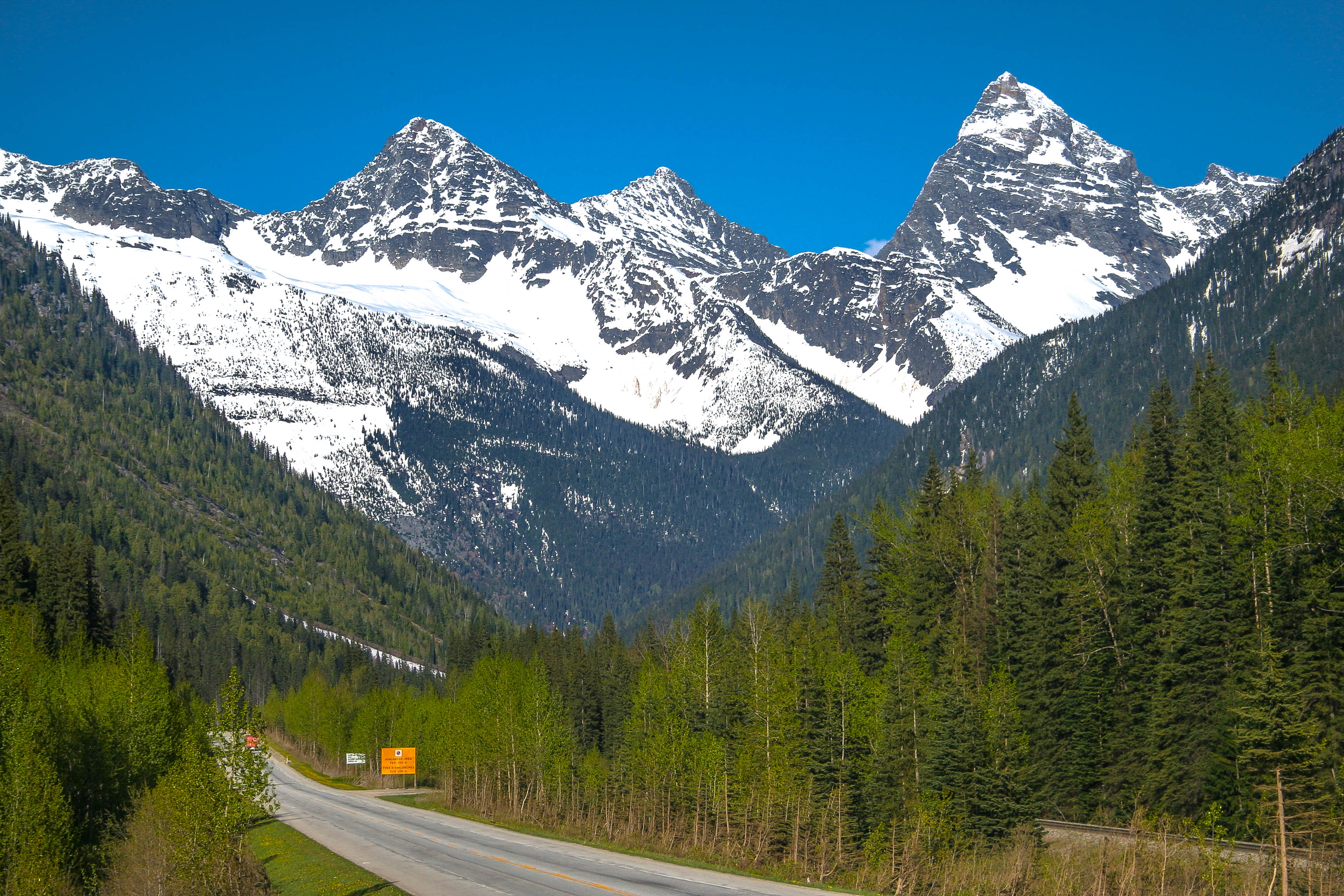
Eagle Peak (left) with Mount Sir Donald (right) as seen from the Trans-Canada Highway

Eagle Peak was named by Harry Perley, the manager of the Glacier House hotel, for a crag on the west ridge that appears like the head of an eagle.

The first ascent of the mountain was made in 1893 by Samuel Allen and Walter Wilcox. Wilcox wrote of the climb in his 1896 book "Camping in the Canadian Rockies": "The name of the mountain is derived from a great crag or cliff near the summit, which appears to lean out from a ridge, and bears a striking resemblance to the head of an eagle. When we were making our ascent we came suddenly on the Eagle itself, which now, on a nearer view, proved to be of colossal size, a great leaning tower, about sixty feet high. Rising from one of the rocky ridges, it reached upwards and outwards till the outermost point seemed to overhang a bottomless abyss, perhaps twenty or twenty-five feet beyond the verge of the precipice. The ridge just below the summit is a scene of wild confusion, for the rocky ledges have been split up and wedged apart by frost and storms till they appear as giant blocks of stone ten or fifteen feet high, between the crevices of which one may catch glimpses of the valley and forests thousands of feet below. The view from the summit of Eagle Peak is magnificent and well worth the labor of the climb."

The mountain's name was officially adopted in 1932 when approved by the Geographical Names Board of Canada.

== Climate ==
Based on the Köppen climate classification, Eagle Peak has a subarctic climate with cold, snowy winters, and mild summers. Temperatures can drop below −20 °C with wind chill factors below −30 °C. Precipitation runoff from the mountain drains west into the Illecillewaet River, or east into the Beaver River.

== See also ==
- Geography of British Columbia
