= Glacier Park Lodge (Canada) =

Hotel in British Columbia, Canada, 1962–2019

Coordinates: 51.3023°N 117.5214°W

Glacier Park Lodge was a hotel and roadside stop on Rogers Pass, British Columbia from 1962 to 2019. The lodge attracted tourists to dine and stay overnight while traveling on the Trans-Canada Highway. The property fell into disrepair under the oversight of Parks Canada and closed in 2012. It was demolished.

The Lodge was an iconic building in Glacier National Park in Canada. It had A-frame teal roofs and featured 53 guest rooms, 2 restaurants and a gas station. In the day, it was the only pit stop on the highway stretching 150km in either direction east or west. A building on the original site was known as Glacier House from 1886-1929, to accommodate the Canadian Pacific Railway. Until the late-60s the hotel operated as the Northlander Motor Lodge built by the company of the same name and owned by Captain H.J.C. Terry, in namesake for his shipping firm, Northland Navigation. Parks Canada acquired it in 1968 upon signing a 42-year lease in the interest of environmental protection of the National Park. Part of the lease agreement was to rename it in connection with the location, Glacier National Park.

Until 1997 the hotel was disconnected from the power grid and operated on diesel. It was required to operate year-round, 24/7 to accommodate tourists, even in the cold winter. The location offered quick access to hiking and skiing trails in the Selkirk Mountains.

In 2008, Yoho and Abbott Ridge investments sold the business to Malcolm and Linda Campbell for $2.6 million. The sale was so expensive the hotel fell into disrepair until Parks Canada ordered it demolished. The hotel closed on September 30, 2012 and soil was remediated post-demolition by 2018.
