= Glacier National Park (Canada) =

National park in British Columbia

- Parc national des Glaciers
- IUCN category II (national park)
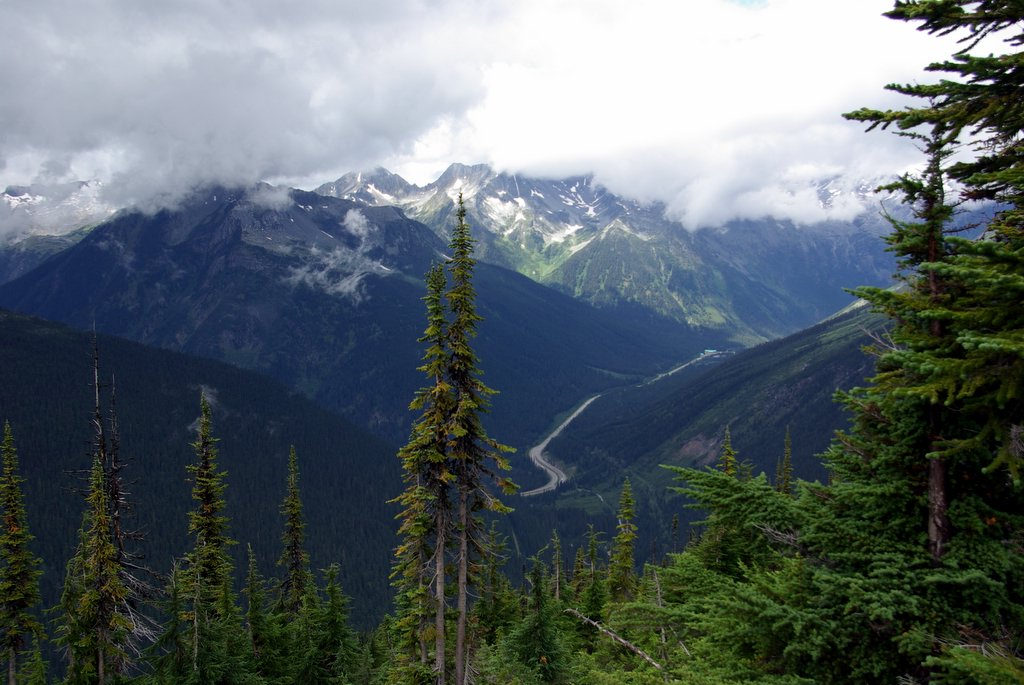
- Rogers Pass, a central feature in the park

- Location within Canada Location within British Columbia
- Interactive map of Glacier National Park
- Location: Columbia-Shuswap, British Columbia, Canada
- Nearest city: Revelstoke, British Columbia
- Coordinates: 51°18′0″N 117°31′7″W
- Area: 1,349 km^{2} (521 sq mi)
- Established: October 10, 1886
- Governing body: Parks Canada
- Website: parks.canada.ca/pn-np/bc/glacier

Glacier National Park is part of a system of 43 parks and park reserves across Canada, and one of seven national parks in British Columbia. Established in 1886, the park encompasses 1,349 km^{2} (521 sq mi), and includes a portion of the Selkirk Mountains, which are part of the larger Columbia Mountains. It also contains the Rogers Pass National Historic Site.

The park's history is closely tied to two primary Canadian transportation routes, the Canadian Pacific Railway (CPR), completed in 1885, and the Trans-Canada Highway, completed in 1963. Rogers Pass in the centre of the park eluded explorers until 1881. The railway brought with it tourism, the establishment of Glacier National Park and the construction of a popular alpine hotel. The heavy winter snows and steep, avalanche-prone valleys of the park have been a major obstacle to transportation, necessitating much railway engineering and avalanche control measures.

The park contains high peaks, large, active glaciers, and one of Canada's largest cave systems. Its dense forests support populations of large mammals, birds, and alpine species. The region is noted for its heavy snowfall. The park has an extensive network of trails, three campgrounds, and four backcountry huts and cabins. Due to the major transportation routes that bisect it, Glacier National Park sees large numbers of visitors.

== History ==
The Selkirk Mountains were first noted by Europeans when explorer David Thompson of the North West Company skirted around them on the Columbia River in 1811. He named them Nelson's Mountains, after Lord Horatio Nelson, but they were later renamed after an executive for the rival Hudson's Bay Company, Lord Thomas Douglas Selkirk.

Finding a pass through the Selkirks became a priority after construction of the Canadian Pacific Railway began. Completion of the railway was a condition of the Colony of British Columbia upon entering Canadian Confederation in 1867. In 1865, Canadian Pacific Surveyor Walter Moberly led an expedition up the Illecillewaet River (which he named, using the Okanangan word for "swift water"). Despite recently discovering Eagle Pass through the nearby Monashees, Moberly failed to find a pass through the Selkirks after getting sidetracked in the Tangier Creek drainage. His party refused to explore further due to the lateness of the season, and Moberly was forced to retreat.

=== Rogers Pass ===
An expedition led by Major Albert Bowman Rogers up the Illecillewaet discovered a viable pass in 1881. Rogers was awarded a five thousand dollar prize for locating a route through the mountains. In 1885, the CPR constructed a line through Rogers Pass and the following year trains were travelling west to the Pacific for the first time in Canada. The federal government and the CPR quickly realized the tourism potential of the mountainous, heavily glaciated area. Following a trip by Prime Minister John A. Macdonald and his wife Agnes through the Rockies on the newly completed Trancontinental Railroad, he returned to Ottawa inspired, and led the creation of Glacier and Yoho National Parks, both established on October 10, 1886. They were the second and third national parks in the country, after Banff, a year earlier.

=== Glacier House ===
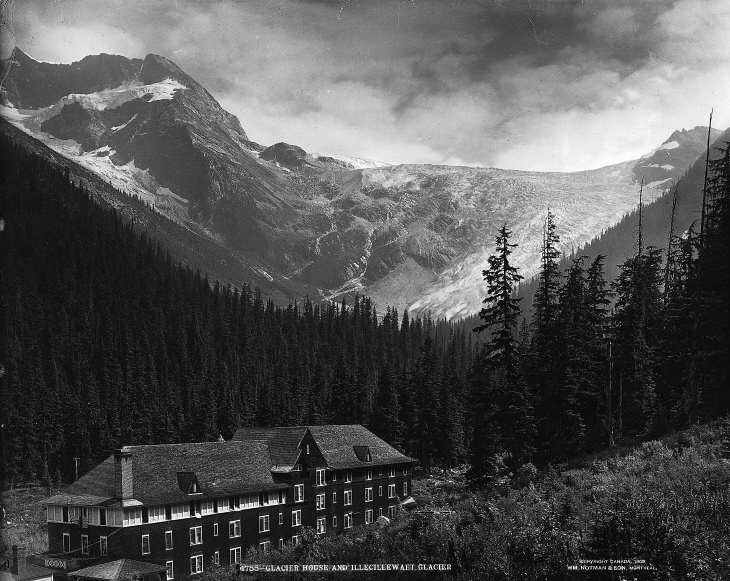
Glacier House in 1909

The grade of the railway approaching Rogers Pass was too steep to allow for dining cars on the trains, so the CPR built a hotel west of the pass in 1886. This added to a collection of CPR-owned hotels across Canada, including Mount Stephen House in Yoho National Park, built in the same year and with the same floor plan. Glacier House, located near the terminus of the Illecillewaet Glacier (called the Great Glacier at the time), became a centre for tourism, mountaineering, glaciology, and photography in the Selkirks. The hotel was expanded in 1905 and 1911. It was considered one of western Canada's premier tourist destinations at the turn of the twentieth century.

The hotel attracted alpinists from around the world. Owing to its elevation, climbers could be in the high alpine within hours of leaving their room. In 1899, the CPR contracted the services of several Swiss guides to assist the less mountain-savvy tourists through the high country. Throughout the Glacier House period, many first ascents were made on peaks within the park. The hotel also attracted naturalists and scientists keen to study the mountain environment. Mary Vaux Walcott and her brothers, George and William Vaux, visited the area many times, and began the first scientific studies of the Illecillewaet Glacier.

=== Mountaineering ===
Glacier House is considered "the first center of alpinism" in North America by American Alpine Club historian William Lowell Putnam. It saw an influx of European and American professional climbers in its first two decades of operation. William Spotswood Green was the first European climber to make note of the excellent climbing possibilities of peaks near the CPR line. Green and Henry Swanzy made the first recorded ascents of major peaks in the summer of 1888, climbing Mount Bonney and Green's Peak. Harold Topham, a British climber, made many first ascents in 1890 including Mount Fox; he later joined with Henry Forster, and two Swiss climbers, Emil Huber and Carl Sulzer to explore the southern peaks of the park. Huber and Sulzer also claimed the prized first ascent of the dramatic Mount Sir Donald.

Arthur Oliver Wheeler, a cartographer, climber, and founding member of the Alpine Club of Canada (ACC), came to Glacier House in 1901. This started a thirty-year relationship with the northern Selkirks, which saw Wheeler map the region, publish large reference works on its geography, and explore much of the park's terrain. An ACC hut near the Illecillewaet campground bears his name, as well as a peak and a pass. Professor Charles Ernest Fay, first president of the American Alpine Club, after visiting the park in the 1890s, publicized it in the club's magazine. By the 1900s, almost all of the park's prominent peaks had seen human tracks.

=== Connaught Tunnel and the Trans-Canada Highway ===
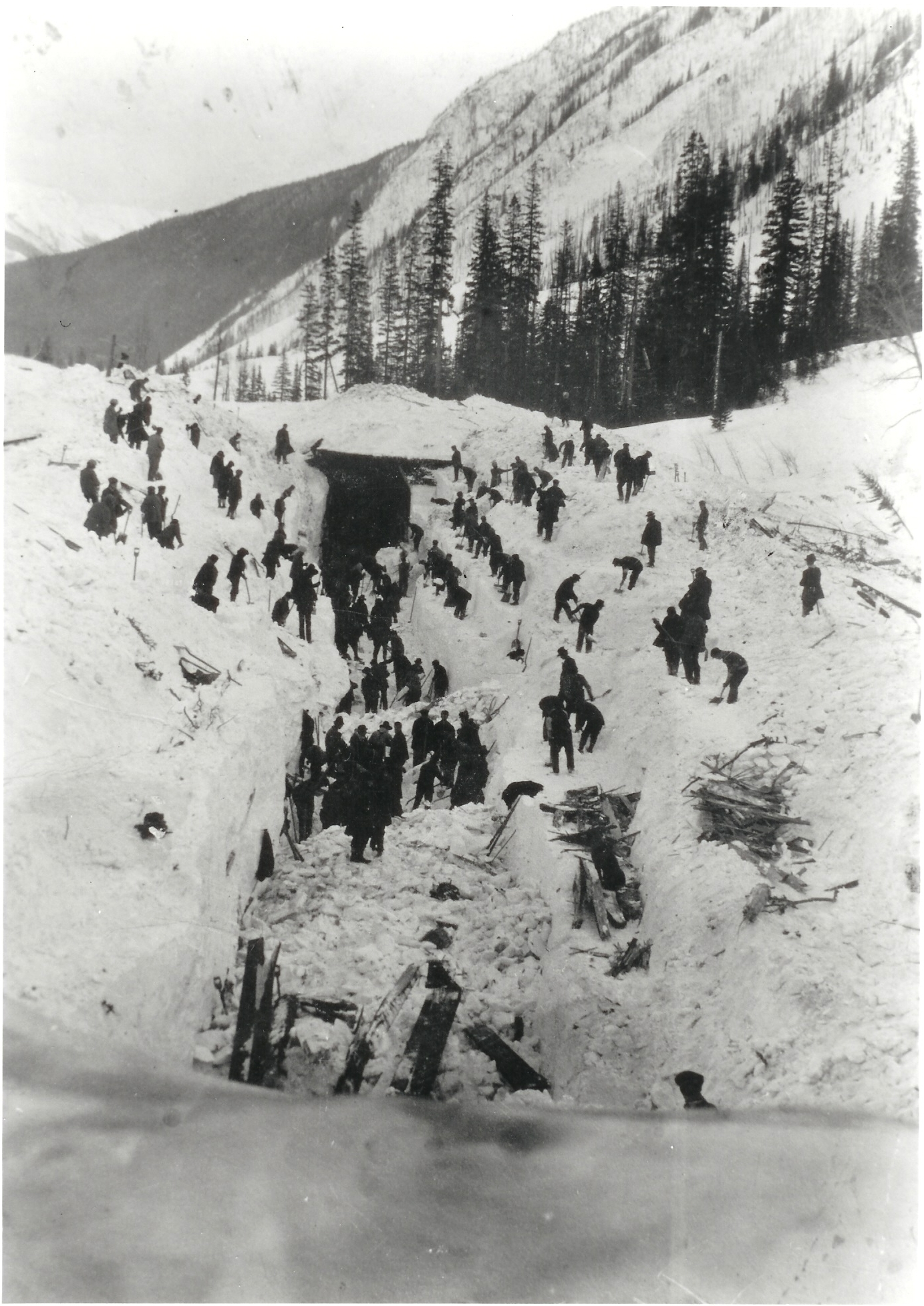
CPR workers attempt to rescue buried colleagues in the 1910 Rogers Pass avalanche

After its first winter in operation in 1886, it became clear to the CPR that the heavy snows of Rogers Pass were going to be a serious challenge. Extensive snow sheds were built to shelter the rails from frequent avalanches. These wood sheds became a fire hazard in the summer months, so a separate summer track was built. In 1910, while clearing one slide, another avalanche came down Avalanche Mountain, killing 62 men. More than half the workers killed in the slide were of Japanese descent. In all, two hundred railway employees were killed between 1886 and 1916. In 1912, the CPR admitted defeat and started the construction of an eight-kilometre tunnel under the pass and Mount Macdonald. The Connaught Tunnel opened in 1916.

The new tunnel bypassed Glacier House's siding, and the resulting lack of rail passengers spelled the end for the once-popular hotel. It was closed in 1925, and torn down four years later. The park saw few visitors besides campers from the Alpine Club of Canada's summer camps for the next thirty years. Until this point, automobile travellers crossing the Columbia Mountains had to use the circuitous Big Bend Highway, which followed the upper reaches of the Columbia River north in a large loop. With the planned inundation of much of that valley by hydro projects outlined in the Columbia River Treaty, a new highway route was needed. In 1963, the Trans-Canada Highway was built through Rogers Pass, bringing tourists back to the park in large numbers. Parks Canada built several new campgrounds and expanded the trail system.

== Geography ==
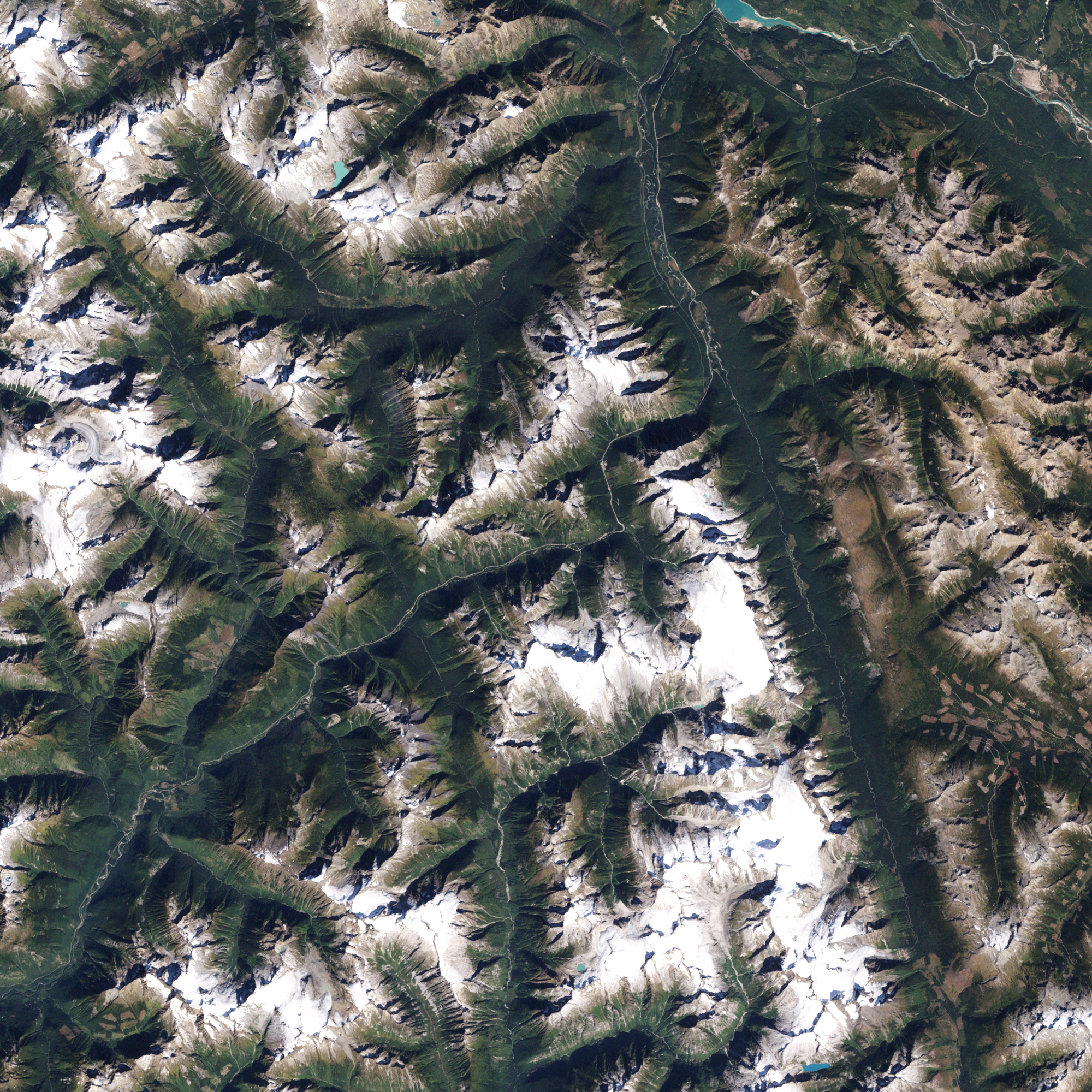
Glacier National Park, as seen from space

The park covers the northern part of the Selkirk Mountains, a sub-range of the Columbia Mountains. It contains numerous glaciers and large, swift waterways. The park is bisected by two major transportation routes, the Trans-Canada Highway and the Canadian Pacific Railway. The nearest towns are Revelstoke to the west, and Golden to the east.

=== Mountains ===
The Columbia Mountains rise from the plateaus of the Central Interior and extend eastward to the Rocky Mountain Trench. Geologically distinct from the nearby Rockies, the range is divided into four sub-ranges: the Cariboos, Monashees, Selkirks, and the Purcells. Glacier encompasses a portion of the northern Selkirks and a narrow strip of the northern Purcells. The topography of the park varies between rounded mountains and ridges in the east, north, and west, and sharp, steep-sided peaks in the central and southern regions. A.O. Wheeler measured many of the park's mountains in 1901 and 1902 using a complex system of fixed points and photographs. In the early 20th century, the area was referred to as the "Canadian Alps". Most names are from historical figures, including explorers, surveyors, mountaineers, and railway and Hudson's Bay Company executives.

==== Major peaks and ranges ====
The highest point in the park is Mount Dawson, at 3,377 metres (11,079 ft). The precipitous Mount Sir Donald stands at 3,284 metres (10,774 ft), Mount Macdonald at 2,883 metres (9,459 ft), Mount McNicoll at 2,610 metres (8,560 ft), and Mount Abbott at 2,465 metres (8,087 ft). Peaks of the Hermit Range, the Bonney and Bostock Groups, the Van Horne Range, Purity Range and the Dawson Range, all lie wholly or in part within the park, including Uto Peak at 2,927 metres (9,603 ft) in the Sir Donald Range.

=== Glaciers ===
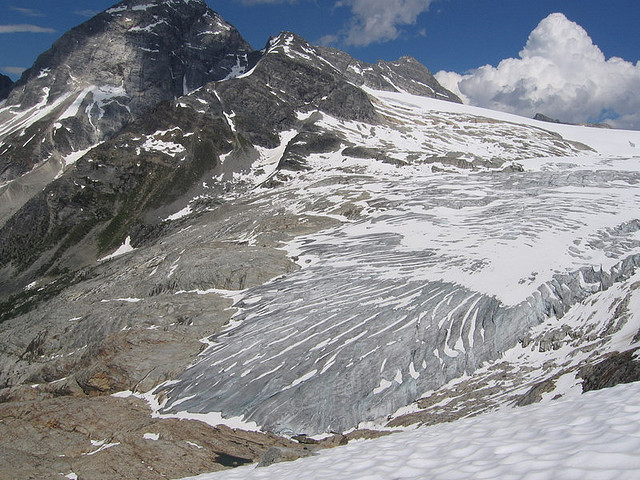
Illecillewaet Glacier

The park has 131 glaciers over 0.05 square kilometres (0.019 sq mi) in size, covering 133 square kilometres (51 sq mi) of the park. Throughout its history, North America has seen cycles of glaciation, where ice sheets advanced and retreated across the terrain. The last glacial period ended about 12,000 years ago, before which all but the highest peaks of the park were covered in ice. The movements of these rivers of ice formed the steep-sided, U-shaped valleys of the park. They also rounded the lesser peaks; ranges in the west of the park show this effect. The glaciers in the park are on whole shrinking and retreating; they are also some of the most studied glaciers in North America.

The glaciers of the park have been dramatically reduced in size in the late 20th and early 21st centuries. Precise measurements of glacial areas started with the Vaux family and A.O. Wheeler in the 1900s. Modern measurements using satellite imagery began with Simon Ommaney's work in the 1980s. Regular inventories of the park’s glaciers have been performed since, with the latest collating data up to 2011. The most recent inventory noted a reduction of 19.4 square kilometres (7.5 sq mi) of glacial surface area from 2000 to 2011.

Due to its location near the highway and railway, the Illecillewaet Glacier is the most visited and photographed. Formerly known as the Great Glacier, it was a major tourist attraction during the Glacier House period from 1886 to 1925. The glacier's terminus, formerly a short walk from the Glacier House site, has retreated far up the mountainside. The névé of the glacier spreads far to the south, also spawning the Geikie Glacier. Most of the large glacial features are south of the Trans-Canada corridor. Other large features include the Deville, Dawson, Asulkan, Bishops, Black, Duncan, Grand, and Avalanche. The park's glaciers have a variety of appearances, with high altitude features smooth and uniform, cracked and riddled with crevasses on the slopes, and black with debris on the valley bottoms. In summer, many of the glaciers take on a red tint; this is the result of a variety of snow algae known as watermelon snow.

=== Rivers ===
All watercourses in the park are part of the Columbia River drainage basin. Park rivers are swift-running and glacially-fed, and have helped carve out the steep valleys and canyons. They carry much silt and rocky debris with them, and often have a milky white appearance. In the summer months, these rivers have noticeable diurnal cycles; they run high in the afternoons as the snow and ice melt is at its peak, then drop considerably with lower nighttime temperatures.

The major rivers are the Illecillewaet, the Beaver, and the headwaters of the Incomappleux and Duncan Rivers. Large creeks and brooks include Mountain, Cougar (which runs underground through the Nakimu Caves), and Battle. The Beaver and Illecillewaet flood occasionally; 1983 and 2012 saw flooding damage to the highway and railway.

== Geology ==
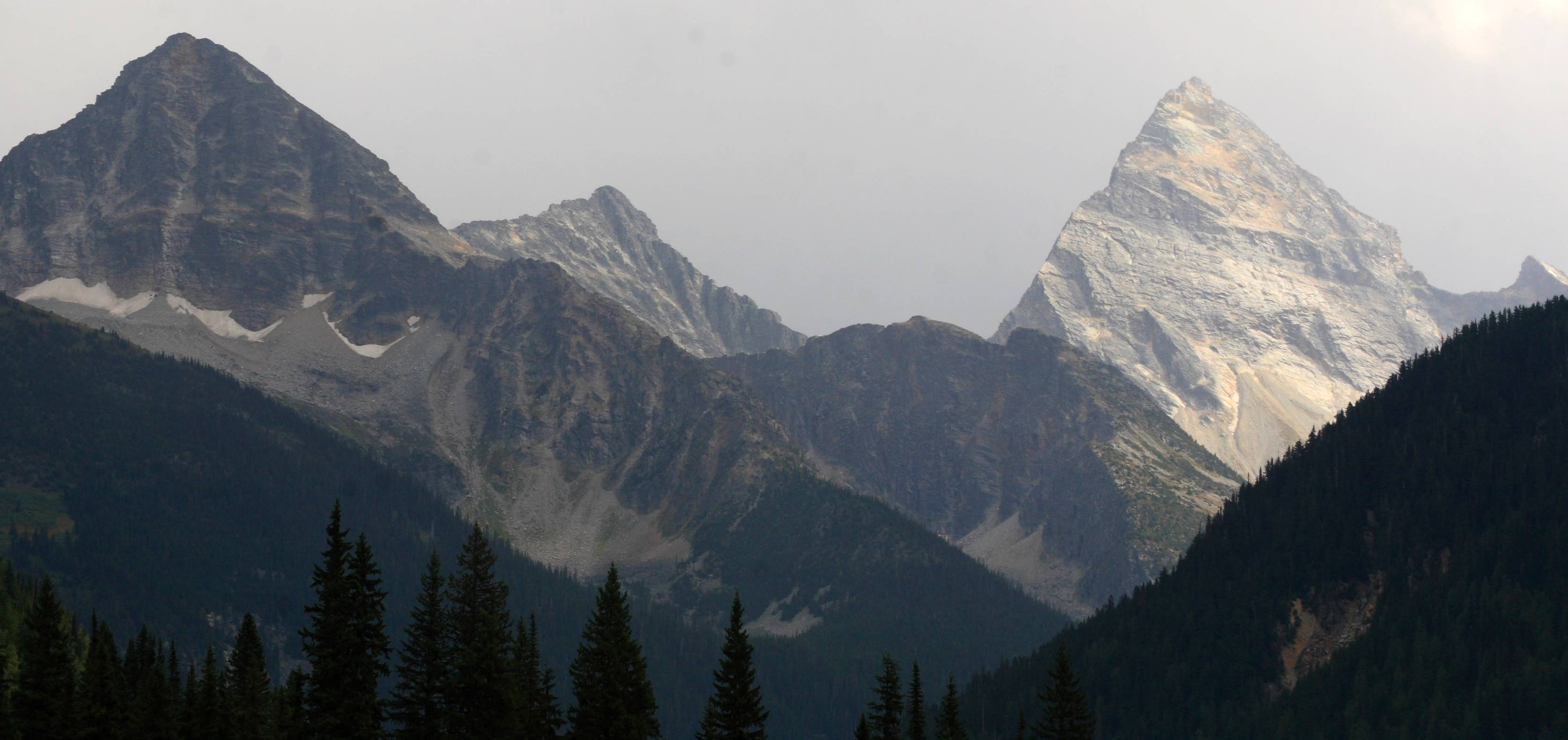
Eagle Peak (left), Uto Peak, and Mount Sir Donald

The geology of the northern Selkirks reveals the tremendous tectonic changes that have shaped the terrain of western North America. Like much of British Columbia, the region was first studied by the prolific surveyor and geologist Dr. George Mercer Dawson in 1890. Topographical maps were first produced by A.O. Wheeler in the early 1900s, and in the 1970s, Wheeler's grandson, Dr. John Wheeler, conducted an extensive geological survey from land and air.

From Rogers Pass, layers of quartzite and slate are visible, revealing the fact that the range was part of a large, silty continental shelf 600 million years ago. 185 million years ago, successive plate movements from the west began to crumple and compress this material, driving some of it deep underground, and some into the heights of the Selkirks. Lime from coral and other organic life was compressed into limestone, which is seen in the Cougar Brook area. Veins of marble are present in the metamorphic rock of the high peaks. Although erosion and the effects of the glaciers are constantly grinding down the mountain peaks, the pressure of the underlying rock continues to drive them upward. Geologists have classed the rocks of the Columbia Mountains into groups, several of which appear in the northern Selkirks. The slates are in the Horsethief Creek and Lardeau groups, quartzite is in the Hamill group, limestone is part of the Badshot Formation, while the metamorphic rocks are classed in the Shuswap Metamorphic Complex.

=== Caves ===
The limestone strata in the park is subject to water erosion by Cougar Brook, a process that has formed the Nakimu Caves. First discovered in 1907, and originally named the Caves of Cheops, then Deutchmann Caves, this 6-kilometre (3.7 mi) long cave system is one of the largest in Canada. The limestone is broken down and softened by carbonic acid in the brook's water. The water also contains pulverised rock from glacial processes, which serve to further etch and cut new passages in the rock. The caves contain a large concentration of a rare substance known as moonmilk - this is a suspension of calcium carbonate kept intact by bacteria. Due to its sensitive nature, and damage done to cave environments by early tourists, Parks Canada has closed the caves to the general public. Access by organized groups and experienced speleologists is allowed with a permit.

== Ecology ==
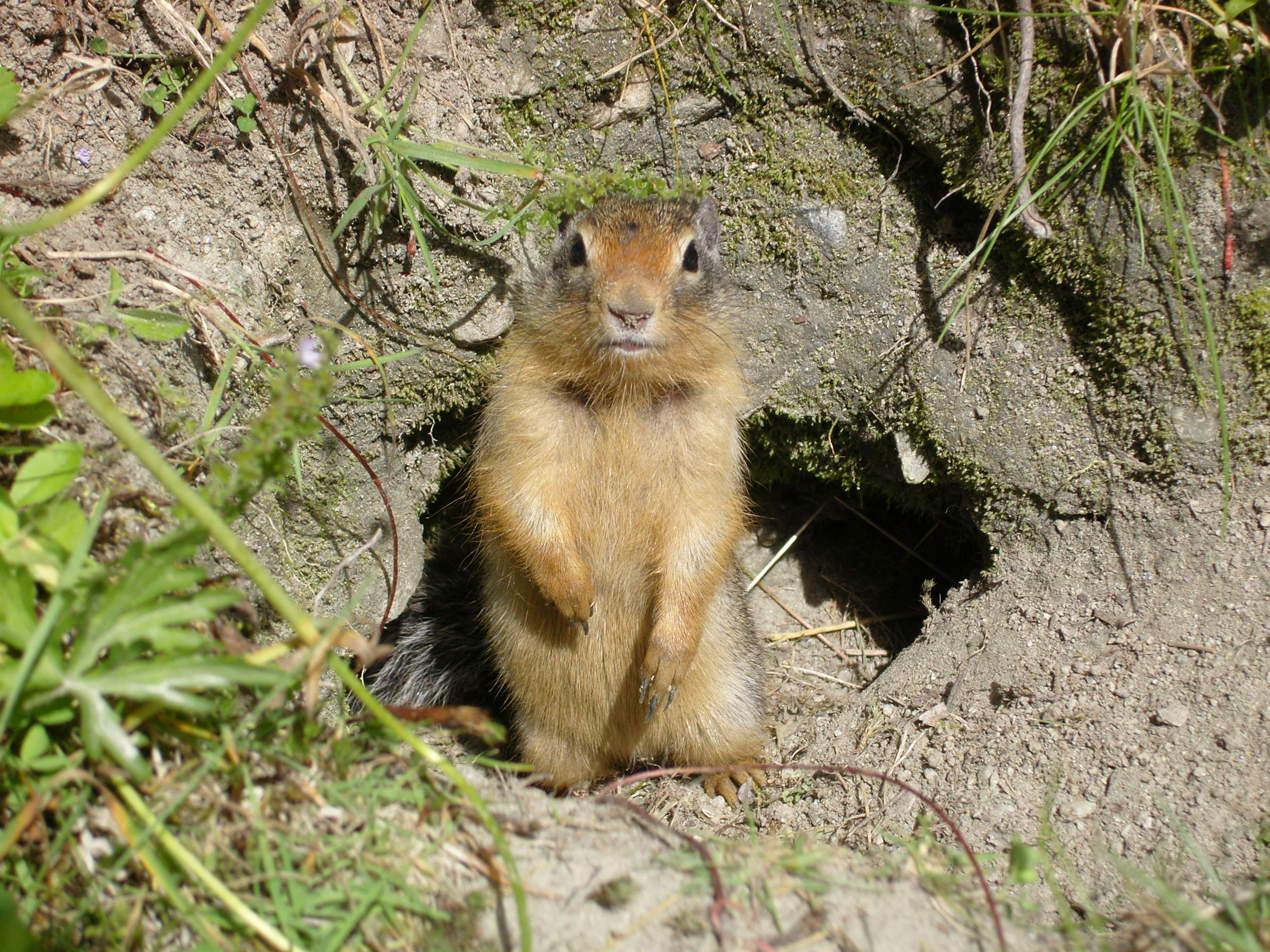
A Columbian ground squirrel at Rogers Pass

Glacier National Park covers a range of habitats, from lush temperate rainforest in the western valleys, to inhospitable ice- and rock-covered alpine areas, to drier fir and pine forests on the eastern boundary. Four of British Columbia's biogeoclimatic zones are found within the park: Interior cedar/hemlock, Engelmann spruce/subalpine fir, Interior Douglas-fir in the eastern extremities, and alpine tundra at high elevations. Parks Canada characterizes these zones as "rainforest, snow forest, and no forest". Animal life in the park ranges from large mammals like caribou and grizzly bear to bird species such as Steller's jay and the golden eagle.

=== Flora ===
The valleys on the western side of the park support dense wet forests, with a thick understory. The widest valleys, such as the Illecillewaet, contain a rare wetlands environment, featuring skunk cabbage and water hemlock. Outside of the wetlands, the lower valleys are covered by Western Red cedar, western white pine, western hemlock, Interior douglas fir, and white birch. Ground species include devil's club, blueberries, liverwort, and fern species.

At middle elevations, the subalpine zone appears. This forest has Engelmann spruce, mountain hemlock, and subalpine fir. The understory is thick here with rhododendron and berry species, as well as deep beds of moss and lichens. At higher elevations, this forest opens up to meadows and slide chutes, which are covered in a lush growth of grasses, herbaceous shrubs, and alpine wildflowers. Parks botanists and others have identified 546 species of flowering plants in the park. Late July to mid-September see an impressive display of alpine blooms.

The alpine meadows continue into the harsh alpine tundra zone, where poor soil, heavy snowfall, cold temperatures, and a very short growing season discourage all but the hardiest sedge grasses, heathers, and lichens.

=== Fauna ===
Glacier's rich forests support a large wildlife population, which Parks staff monitor regularly. There are fifty-three mammal species found within the park. Bears dominate the snow zone; the berry-rich avalanche slides provide an important food source for both black and grizzly species. They spend the winters in deep dens hibernating. Other predators include the northern Rocky Mountain wolf, coyote, red fox, wolverine, cougar, and Canada lynx.

Mountain goats are the most common ungulates in Glacier National Park; a 1985 study counted 300 in the high peaks and valleys of the park. Caribou migrate through certain park valleys, while elk, mule and white-tailed deer can be found throughout. The deep snows of winter drive most ungulates out of the park into the lower elevations of the nearby Rocky Mountain Trench and Columbia valleys. Moose are seen in the park on rare occasions. Several species of squirrels are found in the lower forests, and alpine mammals include pika, hoary marmots, and martens.

Glacier has 235 observed bird species, but the majority are migratory and only seen in the summer months. The 30 species who are year-round residents include woodpeckers, golden eagles, owls, ravens, Steller's jays, and golden-crowned kinglets. Unpredictable explosions of pine siskins, sometimes reaching hundreds of thousands in number, will appear and stay year round, but be gone the next year. American dippers feed in the many waterfalls and cascades of the park.

== Climate ==
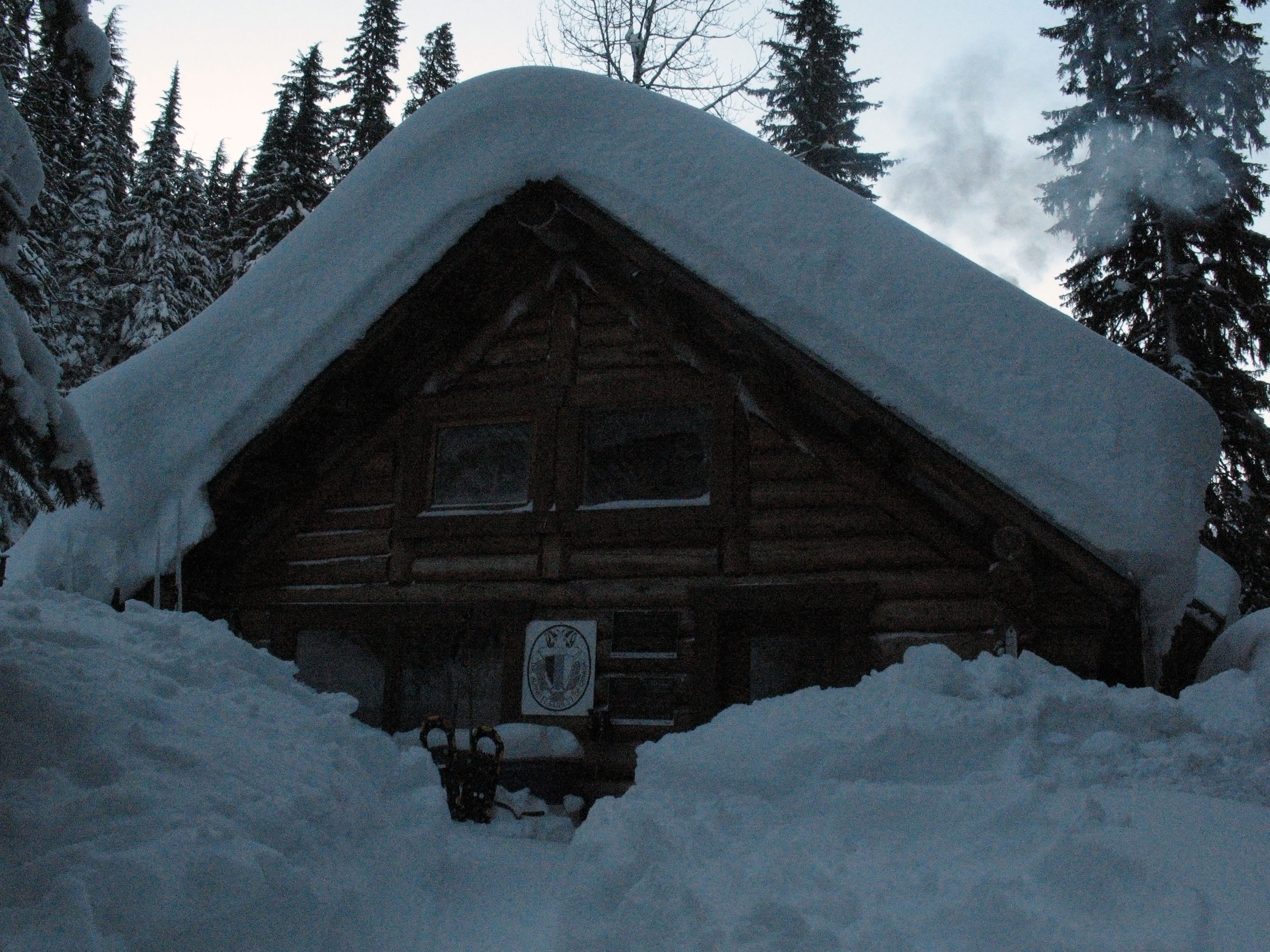
Snow accumulation on the Arthur O. Wheeler Hut near the Illecillewaet campground

Located within the Interior Wetbelt, precipitation is a major environmental factor in the area. The park straddles two prevalent weather systems, with warmer, wetter air from the Pacific meeting the colder, drier air of continental weather systems. The moist air is driven to higher elevations by the mass of the Columbia Mountains. The result is frequent rain and snowstorms, especially during winter months. The mean annual precipitation in subalpine areas is 1.995 metres (6 ft 6.5 in) This contributes to the large icefields and glaciers that cover much of the park's high elevations. Rogers Pass can receive up to 17 metres (56 ft) of snow over the course of a winter.

The eastern edge of the park, along the Purcells, is in the rain shadow and is relatively drier. The area can see wide variations in temperature and weather due to the extreme topography. Winter temperatures in the Selkirks are moderate compared to similar elevations in the Rockies to the east, with summer average highs reaching the high teens Celsius.

Rogers Pass has a subarctic climate (Dfc) or what might be called a subalpine climate with short but mild and rainy summers and long, cold, and extremely snowy winters. Precipitation is heavy and very reliable year round and peaks during the month of January.

Climate data for Glacier National Park Rogers Pass, elev. 1,340 metres (4,400 ft) (1981−2010)
Month	Jan	Feb	Mar	Apr	May	Jun	Jul	Aug	Sep	Oct	Nov	Dec	Year
Record high °C (°F)	3.3 (37.9)	6.1 (43.0)	12.8 (55.0)	17.0 (62.6)	27.0 (80.6)	29.0 (84.2)	32.0 (89.6)	32.8 (91.0)	28.0 (82.4)	21.0 (69.8)	7.2 (45.0)	4.0 (39.2)	32.8 (91.0)
Mean daily maximum °C (°F)	−6.1 (21.0)	−3.5 (25.7)	1.9 (35.4)	6.6 (43.9)	11.1 (52.0)	16.4 (61.5)	19.8 (67.6)	19.7 (67.5)	13.5 (56.3)	4.9 (40.8)	−2.6 (27.3)	−7 (19)	6.2 (43.2)
Daily mean °C (°F)	−8.3 (17.1)	−6.6 (20.1)	−2.1 (28.2)	2.1 (35.8)	5.8 (42.4)	10.3 (50.5)	13.1 (55.6)	12.8 (55.0)	8.0 (46.4)	1.8 (35.2)	−4.5 (23.9)	−9.1 (15.6)	1.9 (35.4)
Mean daily minimum °C (°F)	−10.5 (13.1)	−9.7 (14.5)	−6.1 (21.0)	−2.5 (27.5)	0.4 (32.7)	4.2 (39.6)	6.3 (43.3)	5.8 (42.4)	2.5 (36.5)	−1.3 (29.7)	−6.3 (20.7)	−11.2 (11.8)	−2.4 (27.7)
Record low °C (°F)	−34.5 (−30.1)	−31 (−24)	−26.7 (−16.1)	−21.1 (−6.0)	−8 (18)	−2.2 (28.0)	−2.2 (28.0)	−3 (27)	−8.9 (16.0)	−19.4 (−2.9)	−34.5 (−30.1)	−38.9 (−38.0)	−38.9 (−38.0)
Average precipitation mm (inches)	220.2 (8.67)	133.6 (5.26)	109.5 (4.31)	81.1 (3.19)	75.4 (2.97)	89.9 (3.54)	94.7 (3.73)	87.8 (3.46)	90.9 (3.58)	138.1 (5.44)	199.8 (7.87)	176.8 (6.96)	1,494.6 (58.84)
Average rainfall mm (inches)	10.1 (0.40)	4.7 (0.19)	20.9 (0.82)	40.2 (1.58)	67.6 (2.66)	89.7 (3.53)	94.7 (3.73)	87.8 (3.46)	89.0 (3.50)	89.3 (3.52)	32.6 (1.28)	3.4 (0.13)	630.0 (24.80)
Average snowfall cm (inches)	210.1 (82.7)	128.8 (50.7)	88.6 (34.9)	40.9 (16.1)	7.8 (3.1)	0.16 (0.06)	0.0 (0.0)	0.0 (0.0)	1.9 (0.7)	48.9 (19.3)	164.2 (64.6)	173.4 (68.3)	864.7 (340.4)
Average precipitation days (≥ 0.2 mm)	21.5	16.5	17.7	15.4	16.8	17.9	16.4	14.8	13.8	18.0	20.9	20.5	210.2
Average rainy days (≥ 0.2 mm)	0.93	1.3	5.9	11.3	16.0	17.9	16.4	14.8	13.7	13.3	4.0	0.42	115.9
Average snowy days (≥ 0.2 cm)	21.3	16.3	15.5	8.3	2.5	0.15	0.0	0.0	0.48	7.7	19.3	20.4	112.0
Source: Environment Canada.

Climate data for Glacier National Park Mount Fidelity, elev. 1,890 metres (6,200 ft) (1981−2010)
Month	Jan	Feb	Mar	Apr	May	Jun	Jul	Aug	Sep	Oct	Nov	Dec	Year
Record high °C (°F)	5.0 (41.0)	8.9 (48.0)	12.5 (54.5)	17.2 (63.0)	21.5 (70.7)	24.5 (76.1)	27.0 (80.6)	27.8 (82.0)	24.0 (75.2)	20.0 (68.0)	9.5 (49.1)	8.0 (46.4)	27.8 (82.0)
Mean daily maximum °C (°F)	−5.7 (21.7)	−4.3 (24.3)	−1.1 (30.0)	3.3 (37.9)	7.6 (45.7)	11.0 (51.8)	15.2 (59.4)	15.6 (60.1)	10.4 (50.7)	3.0 (37.4)	−3.5 (25.7)	−6.6 (20.1)	3.7 (38.7)
Daily mean °C (°F)	−8.1 (17.4)	−7.2 (19.0)	−4.3 (24.3)	−0.2 (31.6)	4.1 (39.4)	7.4 (45.3)	11.0 (51.8)	11.2 (52.2)	6.7 (44.1)	0.2 (32.4)	−5.8 (21.6)	−9 (16)	0.5 (32.9)
Mean daily minimum °C (°F)	−10.6 (12.9)	−10 (14)	−7.5 (18.5)	−3.7 (25.3)	0.6 (33.1)	3.7 (38.7)	6.7 (44.1)	6.8 (44.2)	2.9 (37.2)	−2.6 (27.3)	−8.1 (17.4)	−11.4 (11.5)	−2.8 (27.0)
Record low °C (°F)	−29.5 (−21.1)	−33.5 (−28.3)	−26.1 (−15.0)	−16.7 (1.9)	−10 (14)	−5.5 (22.1)	−2 (28)	−3 (27)	−11.7 (10.9)	−25.5 (−13.9)	−32 (−26)	−31 (−24)	−33.5 (−28.3)
Average precipitation mm (inches)	265.0 (10.43)	180.3 (7.10)	173.1 (6.81)	128.3 (5.05)	110.0 (4.33)	134.7 (5.30)	125.1 (4.93)	119.5 (4.70)	115.1 (4.53)	197.6 (7.78)	257.5 (10.14)	231.6 (9.12)	2,037.8 (80.22)
Average rainfall mm (inches)	5.3 (0.21)	1.2 (0.05)	5.2 (0.20)	21.8 (0.86)	70.4 (2.77)	125.2 (4.93)	123.3 (4.85)	118.7 (4.67)	101.6 (4.00)	62.3 (2.45)	14.2 (0.56)	0.7 (0.03)	649.9 (25.58)
Average snowfall cm (inches)	259.7 (102.2)	179.1 (70.5)	167.9 (66.1)	106.5 (41.9)	39.6 (15.6)	9.5 (3.7)	1.8 (0.7)	0.7 (0.3)	13.5 (5.3)	135.3 (53.3)	243.3 (95.8)	231.0 (90.9)	1,387.9 (546.3)
Average precipitation days (≥ 0.2 mm)	22.1	17.6	19.6	16.7	16.6	17.8	15.5	14.0	13.8	18.9	21.9	21.6	216.1
Average rainy days (≥ 0.2 mm)	0.56	0.15	1.7	6.6	13.9	17.6	15.5	14.0	13.0	8.9	2.1	0.08	94.09
Average snowy days (≥ 0.2 cm)	22.0	17.5	19.3	14.1	7.1	1.6	0.38	0.23	1.8	13.9	21.3	21.6	140.81
Source: Environment Canada

=== Avalanche control ===
Maintaining the Trans-Canada Highway through the snowy Rogers Pass is a constant battle. Parks Canada works with provincial highways crews and the Canadian Armed Forces to keep the highway open as much as possible. Parks staff play both a research and prevention role by monitoring snowpack levels and predicting avalanche probability, as well as working with the Canadian Forces to trigger controlled avalanches. The Royal Canadian Horse Artillery operate 105mm Howitzer cannons, based at circular gun positions along the highway. The highway is closed to traffic, shells are fired at trigger points identified by Parks forecasters, and smaller, more controlled avalanches are started.

== Facilities ==
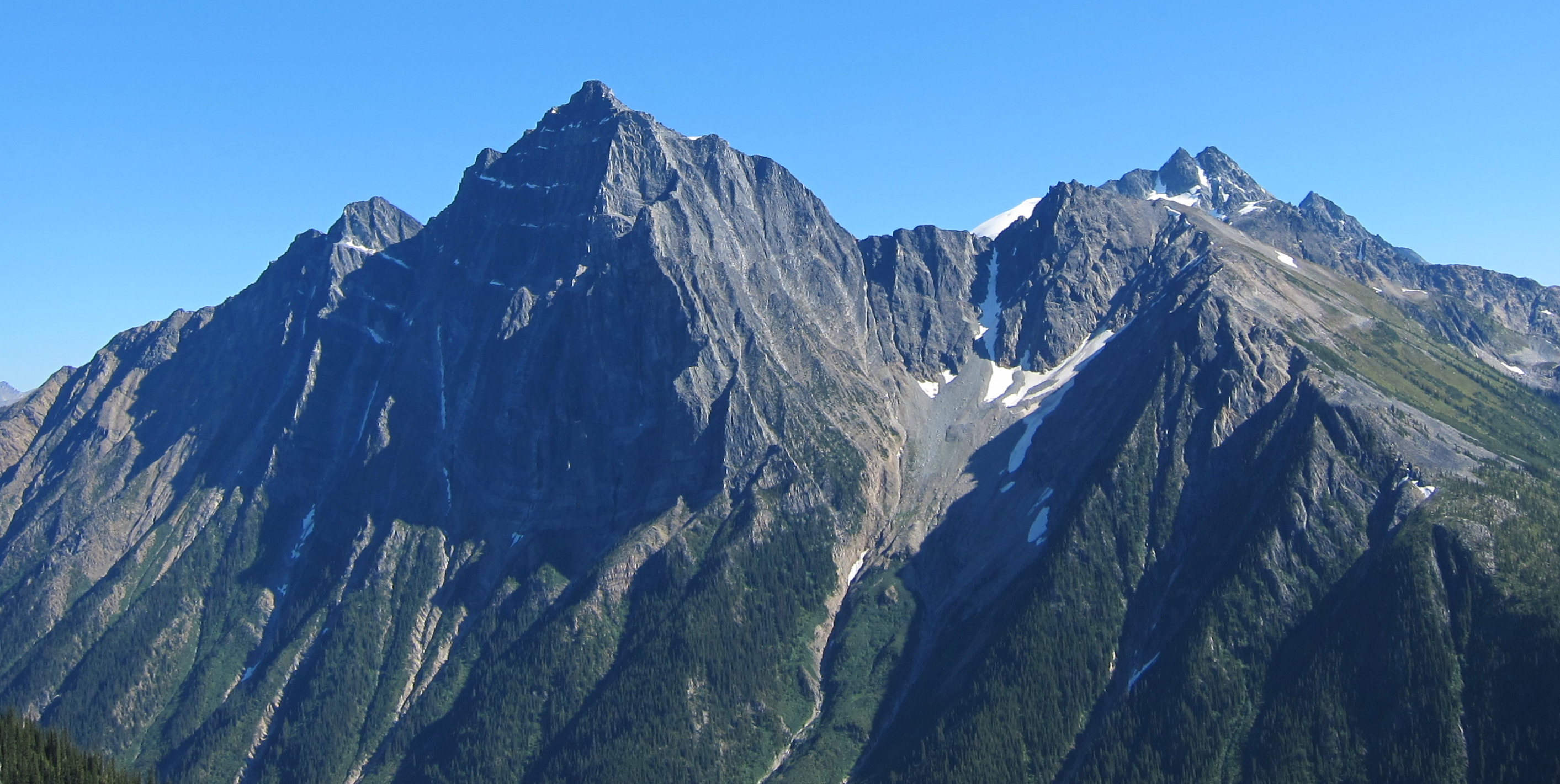
Mount Macdonald

Although the park sees over four million visitors each year, the majority are only passing through on the Trans-Canada Highway. About 15% stop to use park facilities. Of the visitors who experience the park from outside their vehicles, two-thirds are from outside of Canada. There are 140 kilometres (87 mi) of established hiking trails in the park.

The Parks Canada administration and Rogers Pass Discovery Centre are located at Rogers Pass. The interpretive program for Glacier and Mount Revelstoke National Parks is based at the centre. It includes a theatre, an exhibit hall with railway models, natural history displays and wildlife specimens, and a bookstore.

There are three campgrounds in the park. Illecillewaet is the largest, with two smaller campgrounds located at Loop Brook and Sir Donald. There are also five designated backcountry camping areas. Parks and the Alpine Club of Canada maintain four alpine huts and cabins for backcountry users. The Wheeler Hut is the oldest and largest, and is located near the Illecillewaet camping area. The Asulkan hut sits at 2,100 metres (6,900 ft) on the Asulkan Pass, the Sapphire Col hut is a basic shelter near The Dome, and the Glacier Circle cabin in the Beaver River valley is a base for travelling in the southern areas of the park. None of the camping facilities in the park are maintained during winter months.

== See also ==
- Glacier National Park (U.S.)
- List of National Parks of Canada
- National Parks of Canada
