= Nakimu Caves =

Coordinates: 51°16′45″N 117°35′30″W

The Nakimu Caves are a cave system located in Glacier National Park in British Columbia, Canada. The caves run for six kilometres in the central region of the park. The name means "grumbling spirits" in the Shuswap language. They were formed by the action of Cougar Brook on a soluble limestone strata. The access is through Balu Pass.

The caves were discovered in 1902 by D. Woolsey and W. Scott. They were more thoroughly explored in 1904 by Revelstoke resident Charles Deutchmann, and were called both Cheop's Caves and Deutchmann Caves before being called Nakimu. Deutchmann signed a contract with Parks Canada to operate tours in the caves. A teahouse was constructed near the cave mouth and a road was built from the Illecillewaet River valley. During the heyday of Glacier House in the early 1900s, Deutchmann constructed a series of wooden stairs and boardwalks and the caves were visited heavily by tourists. The natural features were significantly damaged by human contact during the period. The Nakimu Caves had for a period what was considered the only true "show" cave among the Canadian national parks, although this section was closed in 1935 because of decreased tourist attendance. Parks removed the remnants of Deutchmann's construction, and closed the caves completely to all but experienced cavers with permits.

The caves consist of marbloid rocks from the Cambrian period, many of which exhibit scalloping patterns. The cave contains cauliflower-shaped agglomerations of a substance called moonmilk; this is a precipitate of calcium carbonate and bacteria.
