= 1910 Rogers Pass avalanche =

Disaster in British Columbia, Canada

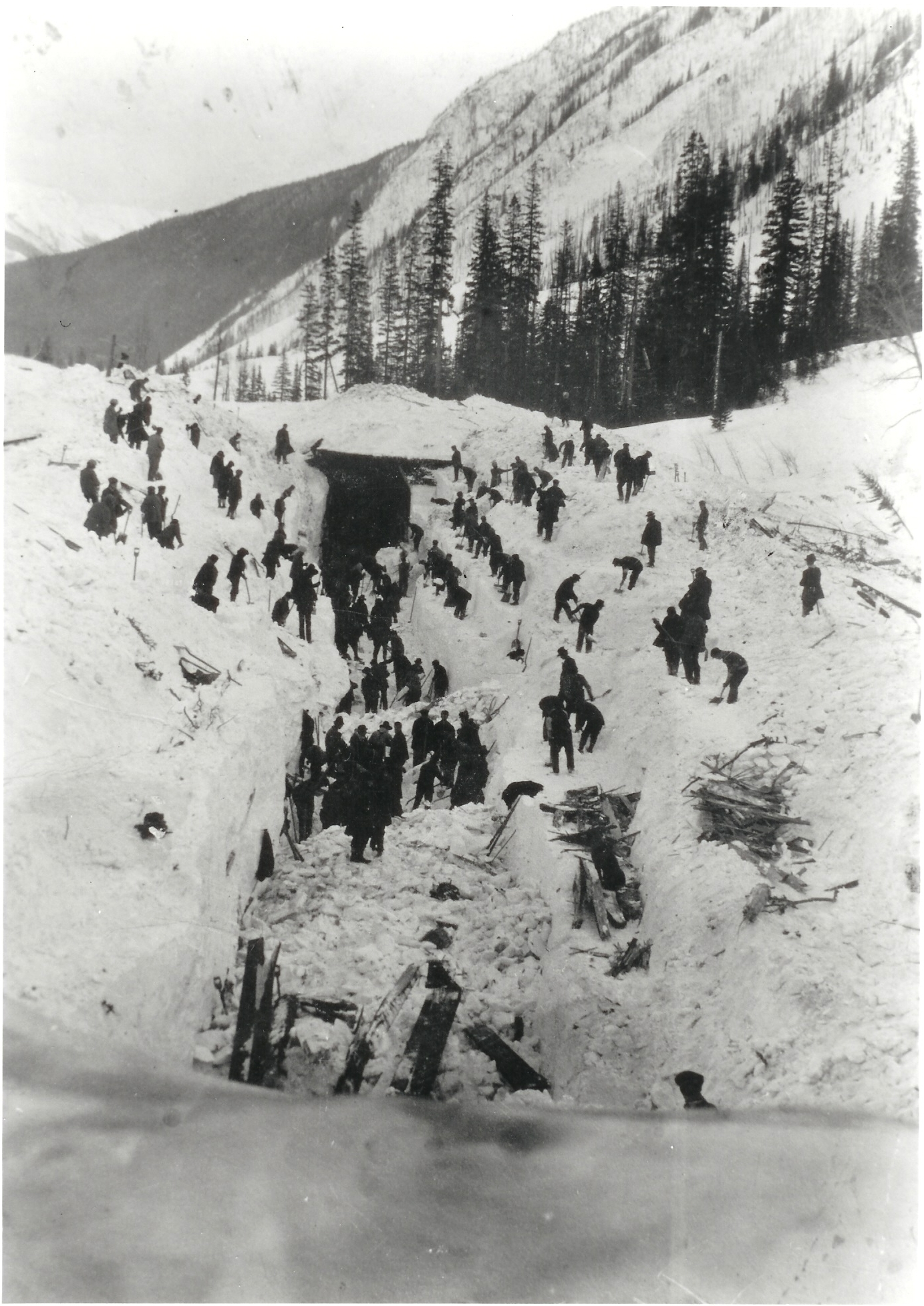
- Workers recover bodies and clear the tracks on March 5

Details
- Date: March 4, 1910; 23:30
- Location: Rogers Pass, British Columbia
- Coordinates: 51°17′00″N 117°30′43″W
- Country: Canada
- Operator: Canadian Pacific Railway
- Incident type: Avalanche

Statistics
- Trains: 1
- Deaths: 58
- Injured: 1

The 1910 Rogers Pass Avalanche killed 58 men clearing a railroad line just outside of Revelstoke in Rogers Pass through the Selkirk Mountains in British Columbia on March 4, 1910. It is Canada's worst avalanche disaster.

== Rogers Pass ==
The Canadian Pacific Railway's line through Rogers Pass completed its transcontinental railroad through to Canada's west coast, and at the time was the only such link. It was therefore of vital importance to keep it open through the winter months. Although completed in November 1885 it was soon abandoned as throughout that winter, up to 12 metres of snow buried the line and avalanches tore away newly-laid sections of track. A costly system of 31 'snow sheds' was constructed to protect the most vulnerable sections of line, covering 6.5 km (4.0 mi) in all. However, most of the route through the pass was still unprotected, meaning that men and equipment were often called upon to clear the track.

== March 1910 ==
The winter of 1909–1910 had conditions which were particularly conducive to avalanches, with many slides having already happened throughout January and February. On March 1, 96 people had been killed further south in the Wellington avalanche in Washington state. Three days later on the evening of March 4, work crews were dispatched to clear a big slide which had fallen from Cheops Mountain, and buried the tracks just south of Shed 17. The crew consisted of a locomotive-driven rotary snowplow and 63 men. Time was critical as westbound CPR Train Number 97 was just entering the Rocky Mountains, bound for Vancouver. Half an hour before midnight as the track was nearly clear, an unexpected avalanche from Avalanche Mountain swept down the opposite side of the track to the first fall. Around 400 metres of track were buried. The 91-ton locomotive and plow were hurled 15 metres to land upside-down. The wooden cars behind the locomotive were crushed and all but one of the workmen were instantly buried in the deep snow. The only survivor was locomotive fireman Billy Lachance, who had been knocked over by the wind accompanying the fall but otherwise remained unscathed.

When news of the disaster reached nearby Revelstoke a relief train consisting of 200 railmen, physicians and nurses was sent to the scene. They found no casualties to treat; it became a mission to clear the tracks and recover the bodies beneath 10 metres of snow. Many of the dead were found standing upright, frozen in position, reminiscent of Pompeii. 58 workers were killed. Among the dead were 32 Japanese workers.

== Response ==
The disaster was not the first to befall the pass; in all over 200 people had been killed by avalanches there since the line was opened 26 years previously. The CPR finally accepted defeat and in 1913 began boring the five mile long Connaught Tunnel through Mount Macdonald, at the time Canada's longest tunnel, so bypassing the hazard of Rogers Pass. It was opened on December 13, 1916, and the railway abandoned the pass.

== See also ==
- List of rail accidents in Canada
- List of rail accidents (1910–1919)
- 1910 in Canada
- Wellington, Washington
