= Mount McNicoll =

Mountain in British Columbia, Canada

- Location within British Columbia
- Interactive map of Mount McNicoll

Highest point
- Elevation: 2,610 m (8,560 ft)
- Prominence: 335 m (1,099 ft)
- Parent peak: Nordic Mountain
- Coordinates: 51°27′01″N 117°34′11″W

Geography
- Location: British Columbia, Canada
- District: Kootenay Land District
- Parent range: Selkirk Mountains
- Topo map: NTS 82N5 Glacier

Climbing
- First ascent: Unknown

Mount McNicoll is a mountain in the northern Selkirks in Glacier National Park, in the Canadian province of British Columbia, located southeast of Mount Pearce. It is the fifth-highest peak in its range. It is on the Columbia River drainage. Mount McNicoll is named for David McNicoll (1852–1916), the general manager, director, and vice-president of the Canadian Pacific Railway.

== Routes ==
Unknown.
