= Mount Macdonald =

Mountain in British Columbia, Canada

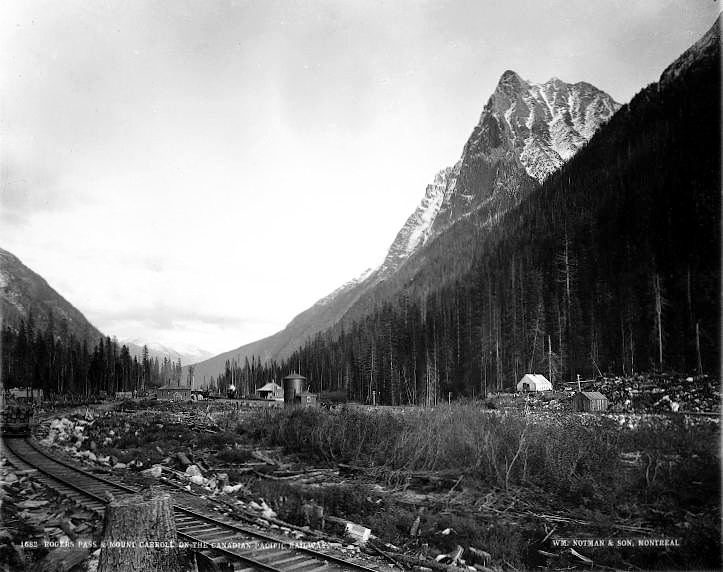
- Rogers Pass and Mount Macdonald (then Mount Carroll) on the Canadian Pacific Railway, 1887

Highest point
- Elevation: 2,883 m (9,459 ft)
- Prominence: 518 m (1,699 ft)
- Parent peak: Uto Peak
- Listing: Mountains of British Columbia
- Coordinates: 51°18′30″N 117°28′18″W

Geography
- Location within British Columbia
- Interactive map of Mount Macdonald
- Location: British Columbia, Canada
- District: Kootenay Land District
- Parent range: Duncan Ranges ← Selkirk Mountains
- Topo map: NTS 82N6 Blaeberry

Climbing
- First ascent: 1886 by DO Lewis and several members of CPR Engineering

Mount Macdonald is a mountain peak located in the Selkirk Mountains of British Columbia, Canada, immediately east of Rogers Pass in Glacier National Park. It is notable as the location of the Canadian Pacific Railway's Connaught and Mount Macdonald Tunnels. At 14.7 km, the Mount Macdonald tunnel is the longest railway tunnel in the Western Hemisphere.

The original name of the peak was Mount Carroll (for a member of the CPR engineering team under A. B. Rogers), but was renamed to honor the first Prime Minister of Canada, Sir John A. Macdonald, by a Privy Council Order in Council #551 on 4 April 1887.

== Climate ==
Based on the Köppen climate classification, this mountain is located in a subarctic climate zone with cold, snowy winters and mild summers. Temperatures can drop below −20 °C with wind chill factors below −30 °C. Precipitation runoff from the mountain drains into tributaries of the Beaver River.

== Gallery ==
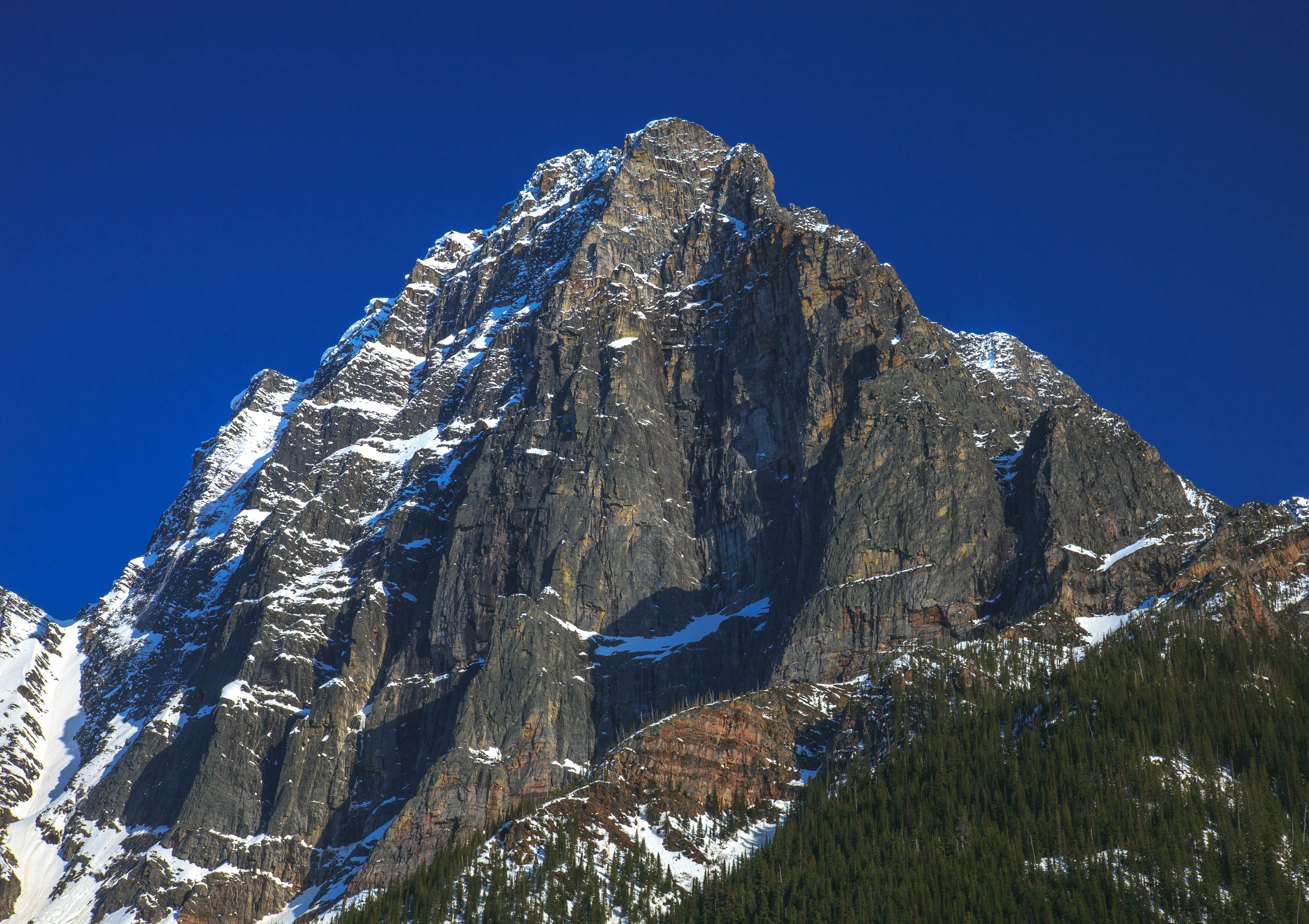
Mount Macdonald's north face

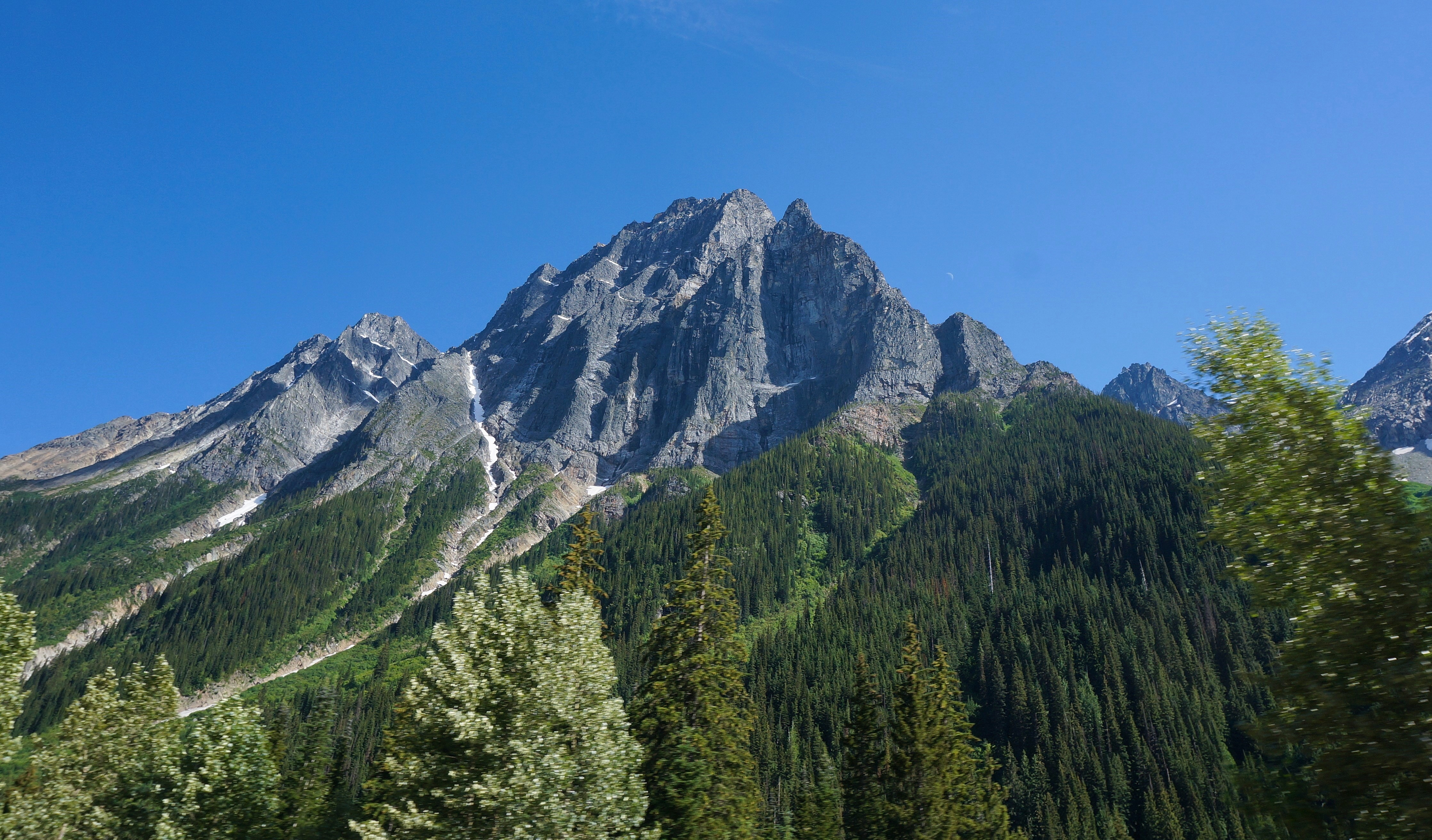
North aspect

== See also ==
- Mountain peaks of Canada
- Mountain peaks of North America
