= Rogers Pass (British Columbia) =

Mountain pass in Canada

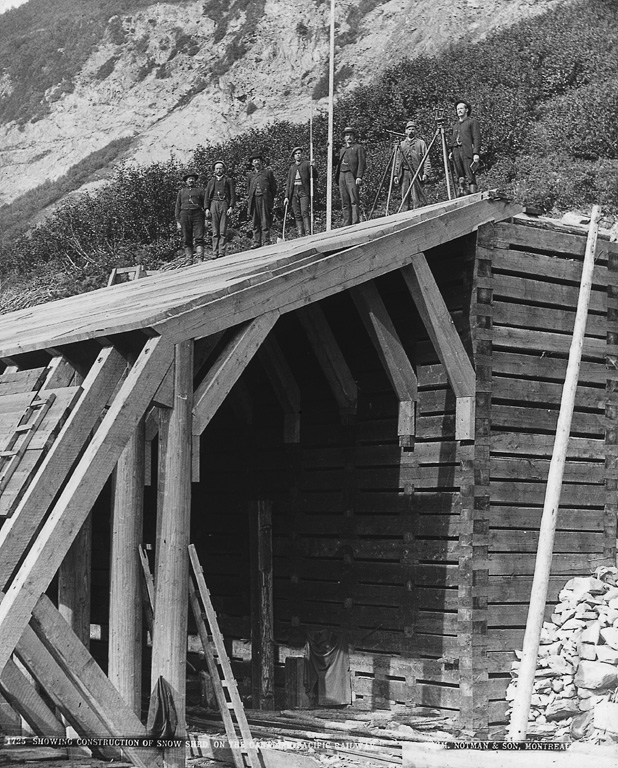
- Snow shed construction, Rogers Pass, 1887.

- Location within British Columbia
- Elevation: 1,330 m (4,360 ft)
- Traversed by: Highway 1 (Trans Canada Highway); CP (formerly)

Location
- Location: Revelstoke / Donald
- Range: Selkirk Mountains
- Coordinates: 51°18′05″N 117°28′35″W
- Topo map: NTS 82N5 Glacier

Rogers Pass is a high mountain pass through the Selkirk Mountains of British Columbia, but the term also includes the approaches used by the Canadian Pacific Railway (CP) and the Trans-Canada Highway. In the heart of Glacier National Park, this National Historic Site has been a tourist destination since 1886.

== Topography ==
Rogers Pass is the lowest route between the Sir Donald and Hermit ranges of the Selkirks, providing a shortcut along the southern perimeter of the Big Bend of the Columbia River from Revelstoke on the west to Donald, near Golden, on the east.

The pass is formed by the headwaters of the Illecillewaet River to the west and by the Beaver River to the east. These rivers are tributaries of the Columbia, which arcs to the north.

== Railway ==
=== Proposal and planning ===
During the 1870s, when the transcontinental was being planned, the preferred route through the Canadian Rockies was the northerly Yellowhead Pass. After awarding the contract, the government allowed CP to amend the designated crossing to the Kicking Horse Pass. Although believing the change advantageous, hindsight indicates the Yellowhead and CP's 1898 Crowsnest Pass would have provided a more economical and strategic combination. Poor judgement best describes this unfortunate decision that created lasting impediments for both the railway and highway.

=== Discovery of the pass ===
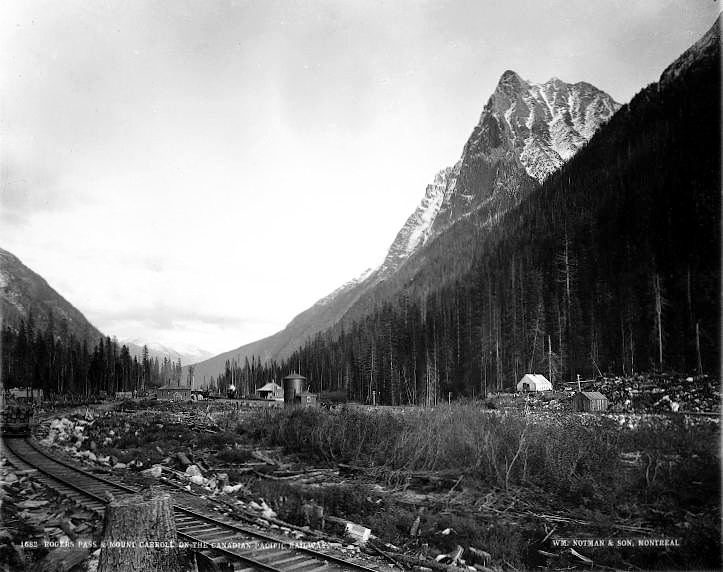
Mt. Macdonald (formerly Mt. Carroll), eastern slope, northeast from summit, 1887. Water tower and 2nd station in centre.

While the transcontinental advanced across the prairies, the railway sought a way over the unexplored Selkirks. In April 1881, CP offered Major A.B. Rogers naming rights and a $5,000 bonus to locate a pass. Walter Moberly had discovered Eagle Pass just to the west, and based on suggestions in Moberly's reports, Rogers started out from what is now Revelstoke, up the Illecillewaet River. On May 28, 1881, the party followed a branch of the river past "Syndicate Peak" (now Mount Sir Donald), discovering a large level opening between the mountains where the waters flowed east and west. (Some secondary sources state that Rogers only saw the pass from a distance, but this is contradicted by first-hand reports.) To get a better view of the landscape, Rogers, his nephew A.L. Rogers and some of their Shuswap guides then climbed to the crest of a nearby mountain ridge, later identified as the ridge between Mount Macdonald and Avalanche Mountain. From here they could see the Beaver River valley on the east side of the Selkirks. Running out of food, the party turned back west. Although they had found a pass, they had been unable to explore its eastern approach, a distance of 18 miles (29 km) from the junction of the Beaver and Columbia rivers. Returning in 1882 from the east, Rogers followed the Beaver River and Connaught Creek (formerly Bear Creek), and on July 24, 1882, he reached the same pass, confirming its existence and the feasibility of a railway route. Rogers refused to cash the $5,000 cheque, and instead framed it upon his wall until CP General Manager William Cornelius Van Horne offered him a gold watch as an incentive to cash it. Folklore has generated many later variations of this story.

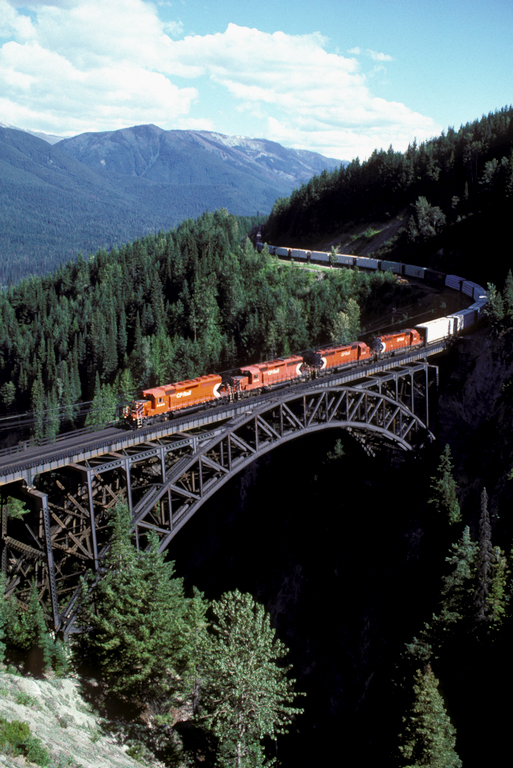
CP freight train, Stoney Creek Bridge, 1988.

The discovery was due in part to the efforts of Moberly, his assistant Albert Perry and their First Nations guides, who had explored the Illecillewaet River on the west side of the pass fifteen year earlier. In later life Moberly stated that Perry reached the pass in 1866, but there is no contemporaneous evidence for this.

=== Planning and construction ===
Rogers blindly believed the pass presented no special engineering difficulties. By May 1883, the westward railhead had only reached Medicine Hat, still leaving time to find an alternative to the equally problematic Kicking Horse Pass. Moberly advocated Howse Pass. During the time it took to determine a practicable Kicking Horse/Selkirks route, the railhead had advanced up the Bow Valley making it too late to use Howse, which required an access from the North Saskatchewan River Valley.

Since the immediate capital costs for the Selkirks and Big Bend options were similar, the additional operating costs expected from the increased mileage eliminated the latter. As a general rule, if the interest payable on a capital investment was less than the expected savings on operating costs, CP made the investment. Decisions were a trade-off between immediate costs and delayed costs. Later traffic revenue enabled upgrades.

The acute capital shortage during 1885 meant months of unpaid payroll, and minor strikes. Captain Sam Steele and his small North-West Mounted Police force protected construction manager James Ross from confrontations with workers. When the North-West Rebellion drew Steele away, Ross formed his own 25-man armed police force. To survive the capital crisis, infrastructure costs were reduced to a bare minimum. Not only did untreated wooden trestles provide all bridging, but cuttings were of minimum width, track was not ballasted, and no snow sheds were built. Ballasting occurred only three years later. Although accurately predicting construction costs was difficult, especially in a mountainous region, total overruns were reasonable.

The eastern approach up the Beaver River required some of the largest trestles on the line.

In early February 1885, three avalanches struck. At MacKenzie camp, 6 miles (10 km) west of the summit, a worker was buried. At McDermot camp, 2 miles (3 km) away, three buried men were never found. At the summit, three occupants escaped through a camp store window. Later that month avalanches totally destroyed the store, and buried six men in the vicinity. These slides, followed by heavy summer rainfall, delayed the work. Abandoning the damaged right-of-way on the western slope, north of the river, CP built the switchback loops well clear of avalanche paths.

The railhead crossed the summit that August. After the last spike ceremony that November, the line was shut down for the winter. After slide damages were repaired, the line opened to through traffic the following June.

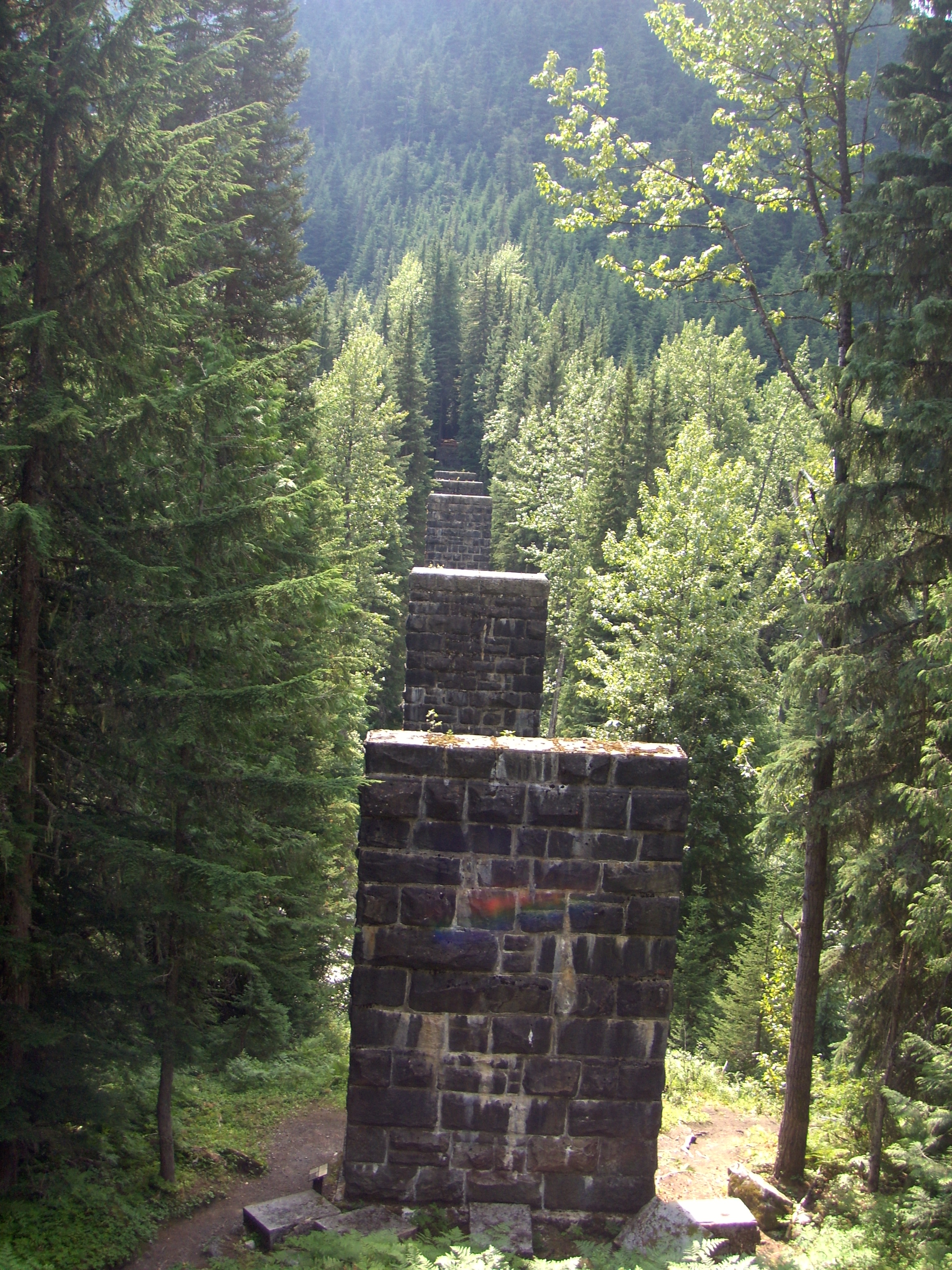
Piers for lower loop viaduct (south of highway), Rogers Pass, 2007.

=== Route (Elevation in ft) ===
Values in Brackets: Miles from Field. View chart definition.

Route details. Only the crest and eastern slope of the Connaught Tunnel route is underground.

Pre-1916 Miles	Post-1916 Miles	..	1891 Ttable	1898 Ttable	1899 Stns	1907 Ttable	1910 Ttable	1916 Ttable Miles	Comments
from Field (approximately)			Miles from Montreal					from Winnipeg	
102.6	98.2	Illecillewaet							
			2,499	2,499	2,497.9	2,497	2,490.7	1,075	
99.9		Laurie							
					2,495.0				
97.7	93.2	Flat Creek							Appears in 1922? timetable.
			Not a listed stop						Appears in 1922? timetable.
Forming part of the Loops, on the lowest crossing of Loop Creek (south of the Illecillewaet River and north of today's highway) a deck plate girder resting on concrete abutments replaced the wooden trestle in 1906. Toronto Foundry Co. installed ironwork on one or more of the Loops crossings at this time.
94.1	89.7	Ross Peak/Ross Peak Siding							Not to be confused with much later MacDonald tunnel station.
			2,490	2,490	2,489.0	2,489	2,482.2	1,067	Not to be confused with much later MacDonald tunnel station.
Part of the Loops, the wooden trestles over the Illecillewaet River were replaced. On the lower crossing, stone piers supported the deck plate girders installed in 1898 and 1906. On the upper crossing, concrete abutments supported the deck plate girders installed in 1906.
91.2		Loop Spur							
					2,486.5				
90.4		Cambie							North end of the lower trestle per photo.
			Not a listed stop						North end of the lower trestle per photo.
Part of the Loops, the wooden trestles across Loop Creek (south of today's road) were replaced. Stone pillars, erected within the framework of the lower trestle, supported the deck plate girders installed in 1904 and 1906. The same replacement process occurred on the upper trestle in 1906.
87.2		Glacier House				Glacier			Not to be confused with later station near west portal.
			2,483	2,483	2,482.5	2,482	2475.3	1,060	Not to be confused with later station near west portal.
84.9		Rogers Pass (first)							Initially called Summit (near the Memorial monument), then Rogers Pass.
			Not a listed stop						Initially called Summit (near the Memorial monument), then Rogers Pass.
84.0		Rogers Pass (84.2 third) & (84.0 fourth)							Immediately north of the Discovery Centre. Small move after 1910 avalanche.
			—N/a	—N/a		2,479	2,472.1	1,056	Immediately north of the Discovery Centre. Small move after 1910 avalanche.
83.0		Rogers Pass (second)							About 1.1 km (0.7 mi) west of the nearest highway showshed on the eastern slope. Moved one mile west after 1899 avalanche.
			2,479	2,479		—N/a	—N/a	—N/a	About 1.1 km (0.7 mi) west of the nearest highway showshed on the eastern slope. Moved one mile west after 1899 avalanche.
80.0		Hermit							Flag stop.
			Not a listed stop						Flag stop.
77.9		Bear Creek							
			2,474	2,474	2,473.2	2,473	2,466.0	1,050	
77.1	77.1	Stoney Creek							
			Not a listed stop						
Two construction workers died on the Stoney Creek trestle at Mile 76.7. In 1894, the Hamilton Bridge Co. replaced the record 286-foot (87 m) high trestle with the often-photographed Stoney Creek Bridge, which was strengthened in 1905.
74.7	74.7	Surprise Creek				Cutbank			
					2,470.0	Not a listed stop			
73.5	73.4			Cedar Creek			Cedar	Sturdee	
			—N/a	2,470	2,468.9		2,461.6	1,046	
Mountain Creek bridge at Mile 71.3 contained the most lumber at over two million board feet. During 1897–1902, fills and a 585-foot (178 m) long bridge replaced the 1,086-foot (331 m) long trestle. Strengthened in 1929, the bridge was replaced in 1978.
70.4	70.4	Griffith							
			Not a listed stop						
67.8		Six-Mile Creek						Anzac	Later called Rogers.
			2,465	2,465	2,463.9	2,462	2,455.9	1,040	Later called Rogers.

=== Early operation ===
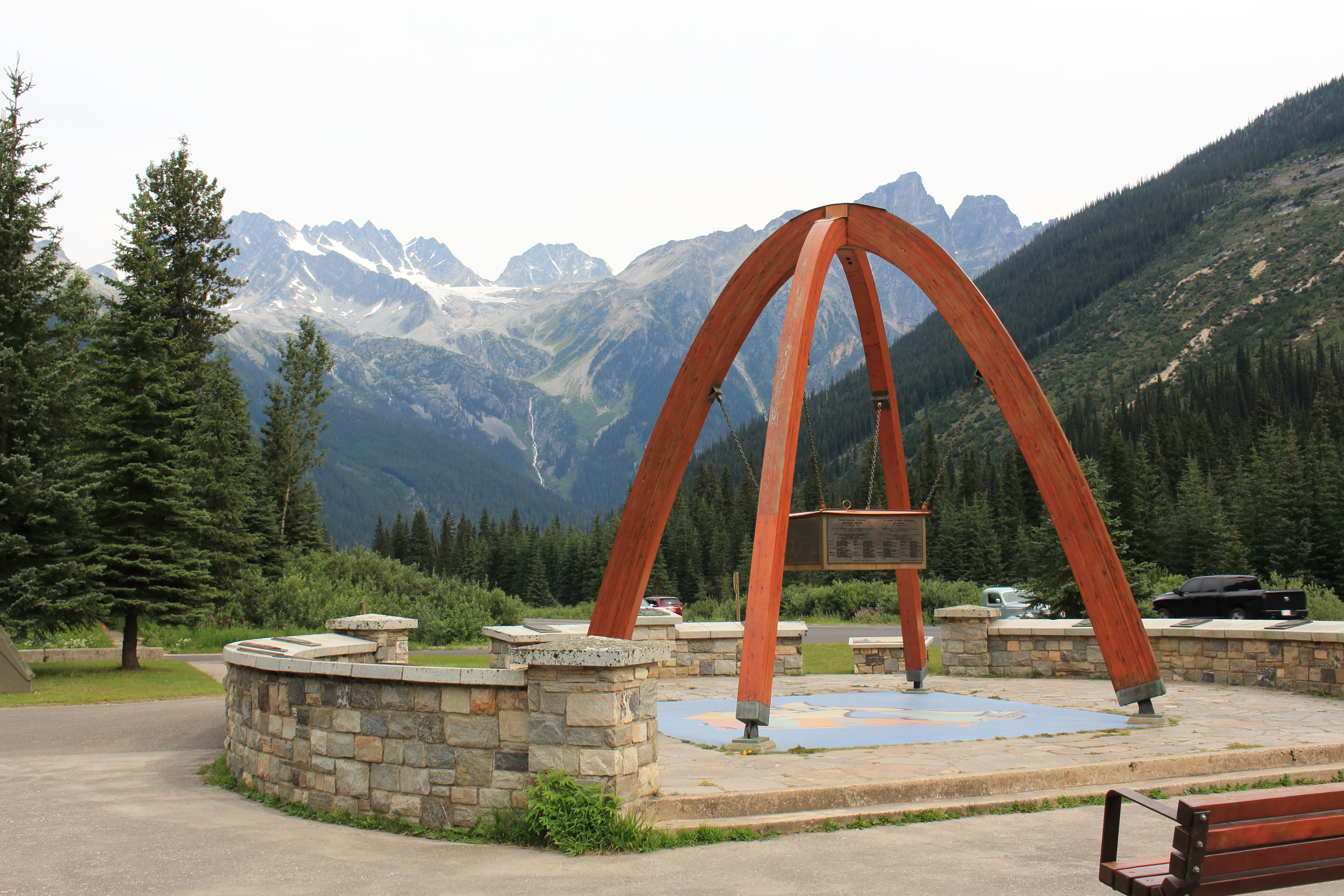
Memorial monument, near summit, Rogers Pass, 2015.

CP's traffic predictions proved largely correct. Contrary claims that early traffic would be mainly eastbound were unfounded, but became a reality within 20 years. Two pusher locomotives, each needing crews, were adequate for each side. However, pusher gradients were expensive to operate. Most loaded freight trains required a single pusher, because they were longer than 9 cars. Wyes were at the Selkirk pushing extremities of Beavermouth (east) and Albert Canyon (west). At the summit, a roundhouse and rail yard existed. Some days no freight trains passed, but on the arrival of a steamer in Vancouver, there could be a quick succession eastward for several days. Double heading replaced rear pushing from 1907. Local traffic was negligible.

Usually, passenger trains did not need pushers, and until 1902, the 5– to 9–car service was daily. On rare occasions, trains were as long as 12 cars. The 1886 average mountain speed of 12 mph (19 km/h) had increased to 18 mph (29 km/h) by 1902. By 1913, to maintain this speed, the 9-car trains required a pusher. Scheduled stops for breakfast, lunch, and dinner existed at Field, Glacier House, and North Bend. Albert Canyon was a scenic stop. The twice daily summer service from 1908 continued into the winter, instead of reducing to one train, and increased to three trains the following summer.

In 1905, CP installed a water-powered bucket system to fill the coal hopper. The next year, the four-locomotive engine house was enlarged to accommodate six locomotives. In 1907, a track deviation created more yard space to handle increased freight. Housing key staff and extensive equipment, the pass functioned as if it were a divisional point. Assigning the most powerful locomotives, the Selkirk section had 12 in 1898 and 18 in 1908. Pushers increased from 5 in 1908 to 11 in 1914. Oil storage facilities were built for the 1912 conversion to oil-fired locomotives in the mountains, eliminating firemen and fire patrols. Additionally, the constant steam pressure increased the tonnage capacity.

In 1915, seven employees received 25-month sentences for creating ghost employees.

One year after the tunnel opening, the right-of-way over the pass was handed over to the Parks Department for a wagon road, and the snow sheds were removed. Some sections of the abandoned railway eventually became walking rail trails in Glacier National Park.

=== Avalanches ===
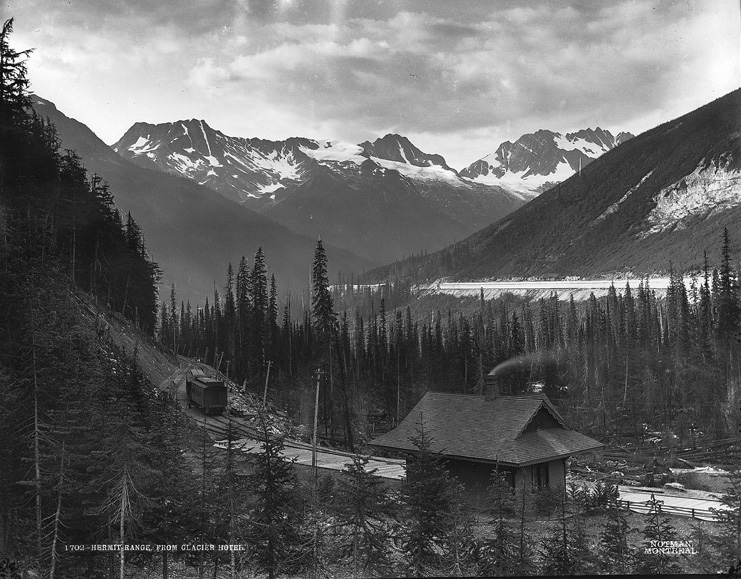
Northwestward, Glacier House Station and Hermit Range, 1887.

The extent and cost of snow sheds had been grossly underestimated. Snow shed construction continued until 1890, but only in places displaying consistent problems, and only where diversions were not a cheaper option. Sheds were patrolled in winter for avalanche damage, and in summer for fires started by smokestacks. An increased section gang shovelled out both slides and drifts. Wing plows could not disperse the really deep snow. A rotary snowplow was shared with Eagle Pass until a dedicated one arrived in February 1890. However, rotaries cannot handle avalanches containing rocks or timber. These combined measures ensured that blockages from 1889/90 onward were nearly always cleared within hours.

The 31 sheds built had a combined length of 6.5 km (4.0 mi). During the first 25 years of the line, 200 people died in avalanches. Single avalanches killed 6 employees in 1887, 7 or 8 in 1899, and about 60 in the 1910 catastrophe. The failure to rebuild snow sheds after the prior track deviation, and the inadequate design strength of an existing shed, proved devastating. On at least four occasions, avalanches struck passenger trains in the pass, seemingly causing no passenger injuries.

During summer months, trains ran on separate tracks outside the sheds. Although the tunnel removed the avalanche danger for that section, the problem persisted along neighbouring segments.

=== Community ===
In 1886, the features of a transient construction community remained. Drinking and gambling characterized the 15 hotels. A single provincial police officer maintained the peace. Transitioning to respectability, formal dances were held. The hamlet of about 50, included two general stores, two hotels, a butcher, a barber, and CP boarding house.

Storekeeper James M. Carroll was postmaster 1890–1892, his store appearing to have barely outlasted his competitor. In 1893, the Queens Hotel, the only one remaining, was renamed the Dewdrop Inn. William Cator, CP agent, was postmaster 1893–1899. In 1899, the population was 25–30, a community newspaper operated, and a school existed. John Taylor, CP agent, was postmaster 1899–1901.

When the station relocated, the community buildings followed suit. Public functions were initially held in the CP boarding house. Residents built a new boarding house for the manager, after she was terminated for not housing scabs during a strike.

C.D. Morris, who opened a store within a tent in 1901, erected a permanent store, boarding house and hall. Lodge, church, and public gatherings used this hall. In 1904, he added 15 or 16 bedrooms and a bathroom to the boarding house to cater for the big summer demand from workers and tourists. He was postmaster 1901–1903. His store clerk, John O. Forbes, and brother, William B. Morris, later filled the role. A 1910 fire destroyed this hotel/boarding house. The store was saved, but badly scorched. The 1916 fire that destroyed the Morris store and residence preceded the move to the new community of Glacier near the west portal. The school similarly relocated.

=== Superseding tunnels ===
Beneath Rogers Pass are the 8.0 km (5.0 mi) Connaught Tunnel (1916) and the 14.7 km (9.1 mi) Mount Macdonald Tunnel (1988). The former once held, and the latter still holds, the title of longest railway tunnel in North America. Connaught handles eastbound traffic, and Mount Macdonald westbound.

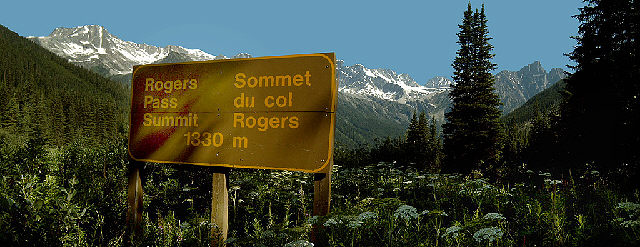
Summit, Rogers Pass, 2005

== Trans-Canada Highway ==
=== Proposal ===
In 1908, a new wagon road was built from Laggan. Two decades later, a proper highway linked Lake Louise and Golden. The selection of a Golden–Revelstoke link via the 174-kilometre-longer (108 mi) Big Bend, rather than over the Selkirks, was the snowplowing difficulty. This road finally opened in 1940. A proposal to upgrade to Trans-Canada Highway standards a decade later, determined that the Selkirks route would be cheaper, and not conflict with the Columbia River hydro-electric potential.

=== Construction and opening ===
Constructed 1956–1962, headquarters of the four camps was one-quarter mile (400 m) from the Glacier station. The former schoolhouse was the dining hall, a former railway house the office, and prefabricated cabins housed the employees. Radio reception was poor. Entertainment, such as movies, or a haircut, required train travel to the nearest towns. Similarly, all supplies came in by train for the workforce of about 500 who built the 28-mile (45 km) highway.

West of the summit, much of the original route was used. To the east, excavations uncovered the remnants of the roundhouse destroyed by the 1899 slide. The provincial government held an official opening ceremony in July 1962, whereas the federal one was the following September. This scenic route reduced bus travel time by five hours.

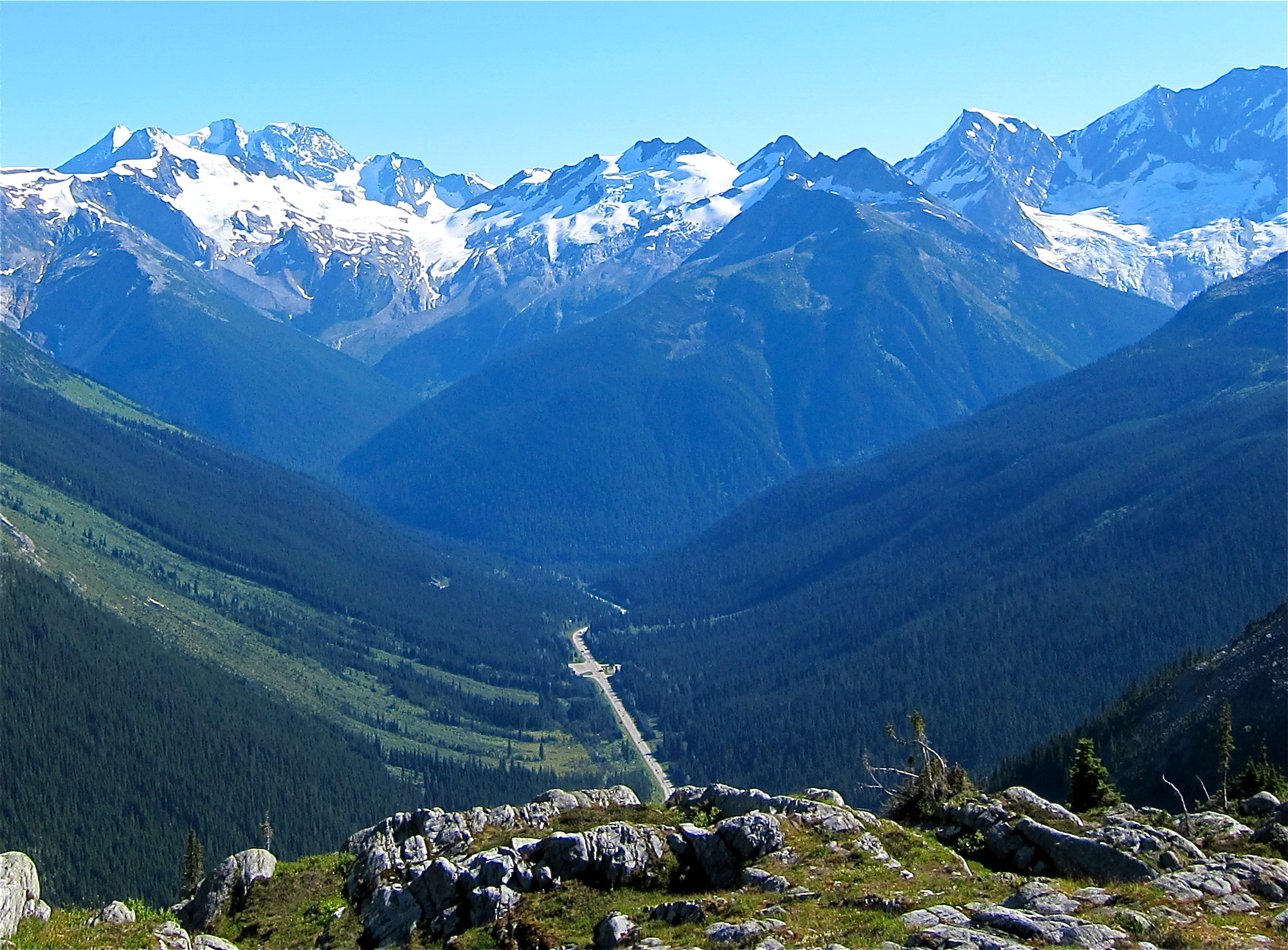
Western approach, Rogers Pass, 2011

=== Avalanche control ===
Prior to 1962, snow sheds provided the only control measure. Three concrete sheds exist on the eastern slope. To keep the highway and railway open during the winter, the Royal Canadian Artillery has since used 105-millimetre (4.1 in) howitzers to knock down unstable snow under controlled circumstances to reduce avalanche hazards. Stopping is prohibited in high-risk locations.

=== Facilities ===
Camping, cabins, and an information centre make up the Glacier park facilities. The Northlander Motor Hotel, opened in 1964, was renamed Glacier Park Lodge. The teal-roofed lodge, restaurant and gas station were the only services for 150 kilometres (93 mi). After expiring in 2010, the lease continued on a month to month basis. The new owners, who acquired the property in 2008, failed to meet their legal obligations to the previous owners, Parks Canada, and others. Parks Canada terminated the lease in 2012. The gas station and lodge, closed in 2009 and 2012 respectively, were both demolished in 2018.

== Non-avalanche accidents and emergencies ==
=== Railway ===
1886: When a man walking the tracks stepped from the path of an approaching train, another train to his rear cut him in two. That week, three rear cars, plus the caboose, from an ascending freight train, broke away and rolled back down the slope, smashing into a following freight train. The latter engineer died instantly, and the several occupants of the caboose sustained fatal or serious injuries, but two children were thrown clear.

1887: A carpenter, who fell from a bridge in the vicinity, rolling 40 feet (12 m) into a stream, suffered a likely fatal skull fracture.

1888: A westbound passenger train waited at snow shed 7, while a crew, standing on a flat car, fought a fire at shed 13. When the coupling broke, the runaway car carried the crew eastward down the slope. All jumped clear, except the conductor, who unable to brake, passed through the burning shed, and jumped just before the car smashed into the stationary train. That year, a young snow shed worker, who refused to seek and pay for medical treatment, died of fever. On his person was $3,000 in cash.

1889: When a freight and passenger train collided in a snow shed to the east, one person was seriously injured and the locomotives received extensive damage.

1890: A cook deliberately poisoned a brakeman, who later died.

1891: A car inspector slipped while boarding and fell beneath the moving passenger train, which cut off his left leg below the knee.

1897: An employee lost three fingers that were caught while coupling cars. The locomotive taking him to hospital derailed, delaying his arrival.

1898: During loading operations, a log slipped and fractured a worker's skull. In a coma for days, the outcome appeared to be total deafness from burst eardrums.

1900: While uncoupling a pusher from an eastbound freight, a brakeman slipped and fell in front of the pusher, sustaining such leg injuries that he died the next day.

1906: Two trains collided when a CPR mainline passenger train ran into a mudslide in the vicinity. Some injuries, but no deaths, were reported.

1907: While clearing track just west of Glacier, a snowplow plunged 20 feet (6 m) down a bank, dislodging a stove and inflicting severe injuries to the right thigh of a worker. Later that year, while infilling a trestle a few hundred feet east of depot, the brakes failed as the final cars were being emptied. When the 14-car train derailed, the employees jumped clear, but the locomotive fell upon the fireman, fatally crushing him. The engineer fractured his leg, and two others sustained lesser injuries. Two months later, by snow shed 17, a brakeman fell from an eastbound train, costing him his left arm.

1908: During excavations with a steam shovel, a bank gave way, burying a worker who suffocated. Later that year, two workers suffered serious injuries when a rail being placed slipped and fell on them.

1909: To the east at Griffith's siding, an eastbound train hauling 12 empty cars derailed. The locomotive and 9 cars rolled down an incline killing the engineer and fireman. Months later, an unmanned locomotive left the pass yard, and derailed 2 miles (3 km) east down the grade.

1911: A body found near Six-Mile Creek suggested a hopper, who boarded a freight train at the pass, had jumped to his death.

1912: When an eastbound passenger train ran into snow slide, three cars derailed, but no serious injuries occurred. However, a slide at Albert Canyon struck the rescue wrecker. The locomotive and three cars toppled over, killing a crew member and injuring three others.

1913: An engineer, who fell into an underground draining trough of heated oil at the roundhouse, later died from the scalding.

1914: Run over by a train, a man survived with serious injuries.

1915: The victims bowled over, a train cut off one man's legs, and the leg above the ankle for a seven-year-old boy.

Refer Connaught Tunnel and west portal vicinity for later incidents in the general area.

=== Highway ===
1967: Near the west portal, a runaway loaded gravel truck collided head on with an eastbound bus carrying 25 passengers. The bus driver, a trainee driver, and three passengers died.

1968: A bus carrying 14 children and two adults plunged 135 feet (41 m) down a gorge, but the occupants suffered only fractures and minor injuries.

1994: To avoid a head-on collision with a highway sanding truck, a tour bus carrying 21 passengers swerved into a snowbank. One passenger sustained a broken leg, and another an injured shoulder.

2000: A tour bus passing through a snow shed drifted into the oncoming lane. A head-on collision with a truck killed both drivers and four passengers. The remaining 21 passengers suffered minor to critical injuries.

2007: After crossing the centre line and crashing through a concrete guardrail, a 24-passenger bus, carrying 11 people and a driver, came to rest on the passenger side. Two passengers incurred non-life threatening injuries.

=== Aircraft ===
1964: A Jodel D.11 crashed. Records sealed.

1969: A Piper PA-28 crashed. Records sealed. After a passenger bailed out to direct traffic, the pilot of a Cessna 185 landed on the highway.

1977: A couple died in a light plane crash in the vicinity of Glacier.

2017: The pilot of a Boeing A75N1 bi-plane survived a crash near the summit. Six months later, the two occupants died when a Mooney M20D crashed in the mountains about 10 kilometres (6.2 mi) southwest of Glacier.

== Climate ==
Rogers Pass has a subarctic climate (Köppen Dfc) with an average high in January of about −7 °C (19 °F) and in July of about 20 °C (68 °F). With an average 9.3 m (31 ft) snowfall per year, Rogers Pass is among the snowiest places in Canada. Encompassing 134 individual paths in the steep terrain, avalanches are common in winter.

Climate data for Rogers Pass, British Columbia
Month	Jan	Feb	Mar	Apr	May	Jun	Jul	Aug	Sep	Oct	Nov	Dec	Year
Mean daily maximum °C (°F)	−7.3 (18.9)	−3.6 (25.5)	1.6 (34.9)	6.6 (43.9)	11.0 (51.8)	15.9 (60.6)	19.6 (67.3)	19.4 (66.9)	13.3 (55.9)	5.0 (41.0)	−2.9 (26.8)	−7.2 (19.0)	5.9 (42.7)
Daily mean °C (°F)	−9.7 (14.5)	−6.6 (20.1)	−2.5 (27.5)	1.9 (35.4)	5.6 (42.1)	9.9 (49.8)	12.8 (55.0)	12.6 (54.7)	7.9 (46.2)	1.8 (35.2)	−4.9 (23.2)	−9.4 (15.1)	1.6 (34.9)
Mean daily minimum °C (°F)	−12.1 (10.2)	−9.6 (14.7)	−6.5 (20.3)	−2.8 (27.0)	0.2 (32.4)	3.9 (39.0)	5.9 (42.6)	5.8 (42.4)	2.3 (36.1)	−1.4 (29.5)	−6.8 (19.8)	−11.6 (11.1)	−2.7 (27.1)
Average precipitation mm (inches)	223.1 (8.78)	156.4 (6.16)	112.2 (4.42)	74.6 (2.94)	70.9 (2.79)	95.9 (3.78)	92.1 (3.63)	91.6 (3.61)	90.0 (3.54)	130.3 (5.13)	196.6 (7.74)	213.4 (8.40)	1,547.3 (60.92)
Average snowfall cm (inches)	216.9 (85.4)	151.8 (59.8)	95.2 (37.5)	41.0 (16.1)	8.5 (3.3)	0.2 (0.1)	0 (0)	0 (0)	2.1 (0.8)	44.7 (17.6)	165.3 (65.1)	206.8 (81.4)	932.5 (367.1)

== See also ==
- Canadian Rockies
- Other CPR grades in British Columbia: Field Hill, Big Hill, Spiral Tunnels, Eagle Pass
