= Uto Peak =

Mountain in British Columbia, Canada

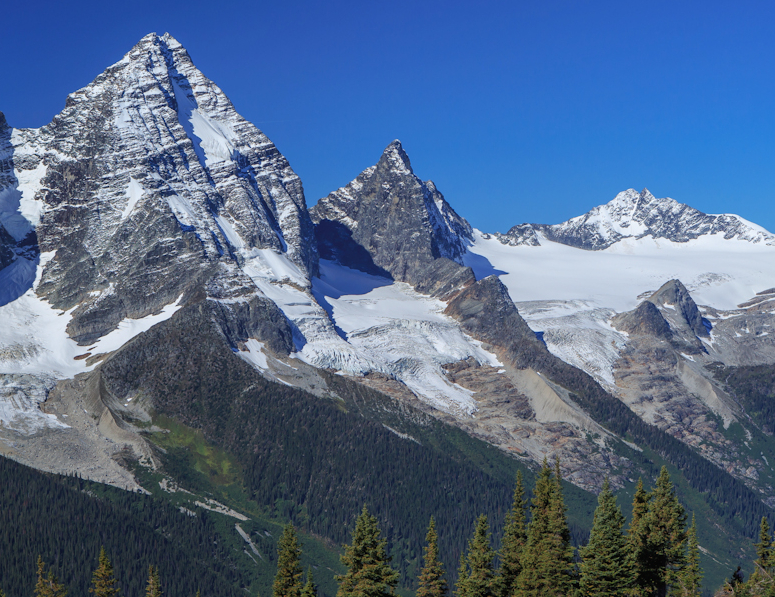
- Uto Peak centered between Mount Sir Donald (left), and Avalanche Mountain (right)

Highest point
- Elevation: 2,927 m (9,603 ft)
- Prominence: 381 m (1,250 ft)
- Parent peak: Mount Sir Donald
- Listing: Mountains of British Columbia
- Coordinates: 51°16′20″N 117°26′25″W

Geography
- Location within British Columbia
- Country: Canada
- Province: British Columbia
- District: Kootenay Land District
- Parent range: Selkirk Mountains
- Topo map: NTS 82N6 Blaeberry

Climbing
- First ascent: 1890 by Emil Huber and Karl Sulzer

Uto Peak is a mountain immediately north of Mount Sir Donald in the Selkirk Mountains of British Columbia, Canada. It was first climbed in 1890 by Emil Huber and Carl Sulzer.

The mountain is named for the Uto section of the Swiss Alpine Club, which counted Huber and Sulzer amongst its members. The Uto section is in turn named after a historic name for the Uetliberg mountain that overlooks the city of Zürich in Switzerland.

== Climate ==
Based on the Köppen climate classification, the mountain has a subarctic climate with cold, snowy winters, and mild summers. Temperatures can drop below −20 °C with wind chill factors below −30 °C. Precipitation runoff from the mountain drains west into the Illecillewaet River, or east into the Beaver River.

== Gallery ==
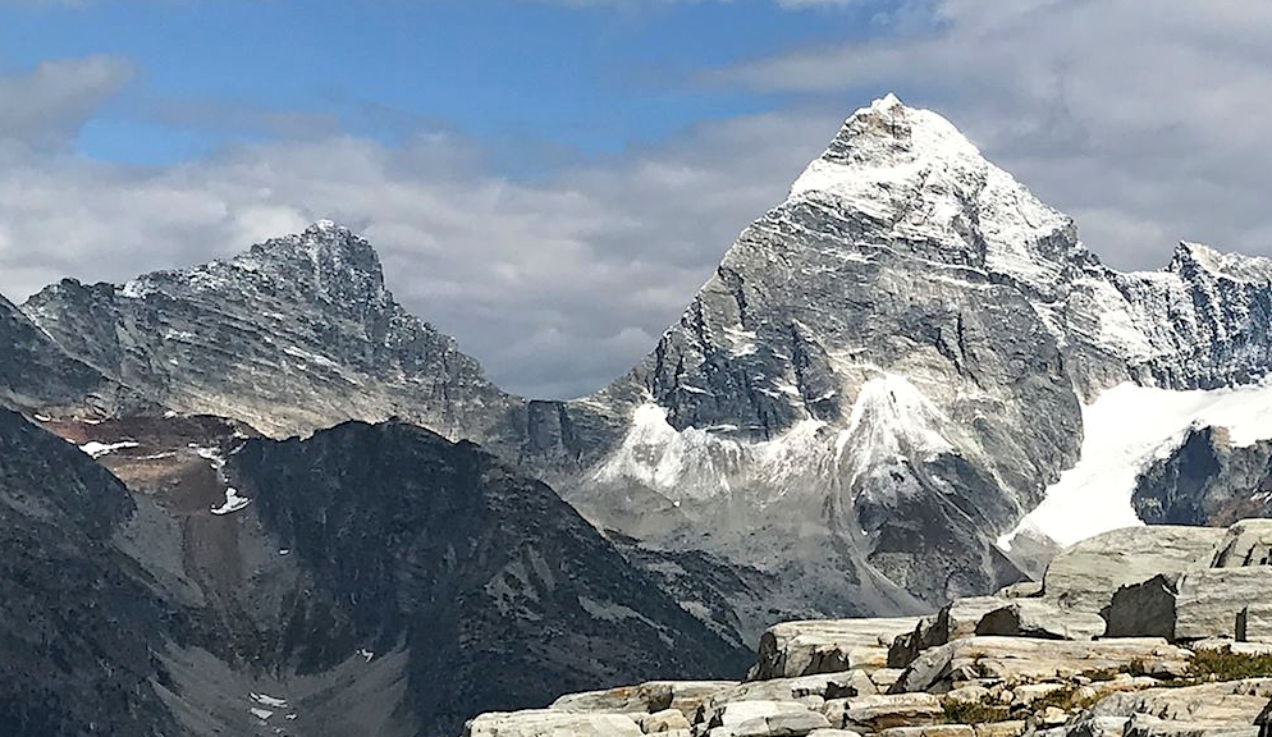
Uto Peak (left) and Mount Sir Donald

== See also ==
- List of mountains of Canada
- Geography of British Columbia
