= Mount Sir Donald =

Mountain summit in British Columbia, Canada

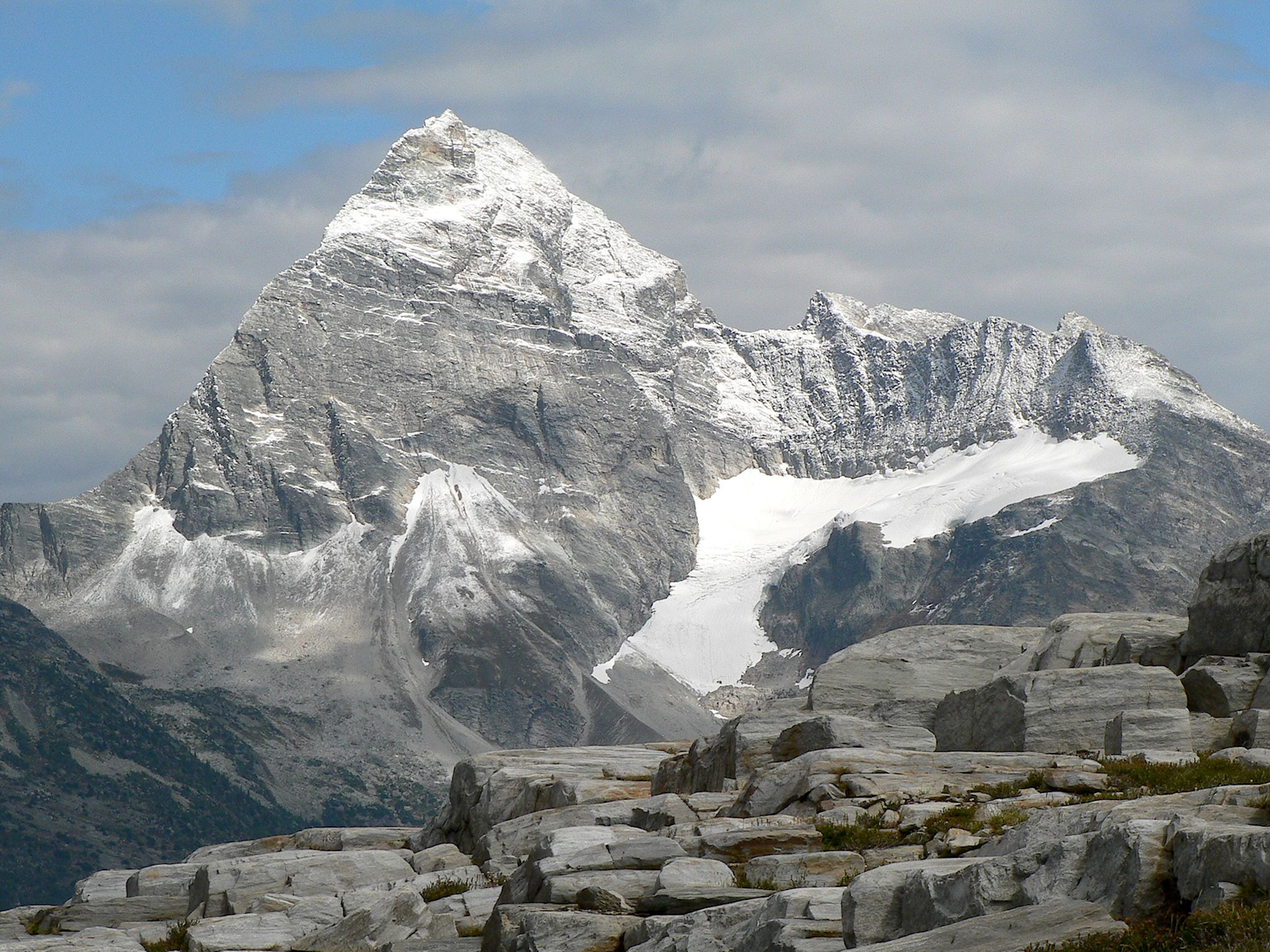
- Mount Sir Donald from Abbott Ridge

Highest point
- Elevation: 3,284 m (10,774 ft)
- Prominence: 874 m (2,867 ft)
- Parent peak: Mount Dawson
- Coordinates: 51°15′47.2″N 117°25′53.0″W

Geography
- Location within British Columbia Location within Canada
- Location: British Columbia, Canada
- District: Kootenay Land District
- Parent range: Selkirk Mountains
- Topo map: NTS 82N6 Blaeberry

Climbing
- First ascent: Emil Huber, Carl Sulzer, Harry Cooper, 1890

Mount Sir Donald is a 3,284-metre (10,774-foot) mountain summit located in the Rogers Pass area of Glacier National Park in the Selkirk Mountains of British Columbia, Canada. Its good rock quality and classic Matterhorn shape make it popular for alpine rock climbers, and the Northwest Arete route is included in the popular book Fifty Classic Climbs of North America.

It was originally named Syndicate Peak in honor of the group who arranged the finances for the completion of the Canadian Pacific Railway, but was later renamed after Donald Smith, 1st Baron Strathcona and Mount Royal, head of the syndicate.

The first ascent was made in 1890 by Emil Huber and Carl Sulzer of Switzerland and porter Harry Cooper. As of the 1910s, an average of three or four ascents per year were being made.

== Climate ==
Based on the Köppen climate classification, the mountain has a subarctic climate with cold, snowy winters, and mild summers. Temperatures can drop below −20 °C with wind chill factors below −30 °C. Precipitation runoff from the mountain drains west into the Illecillewaet River, or east into the Beaver River.

== See also ==
- List of mountains of Canada
- Geography of British Columbia
