= Beaver River (Columbia River tributary) =

Location
- Country: Canada
- Province: British Columbia
- District: Kootenay Land District

Physical characteristics
- Source: Beaver Glacier
  - location: Glacier National Park
  - coordinates: 51°03′36″N 117°17′47″W
- Mouth: Columbia River
  - location: Kinbasket Lake
  - coordinates: 51°32′N 117°26′W
- Basin size: 1,150 km^{2} (440 sq mi)
- Discharge
  - location: Near the mouth
  - average: 41.9 m^{3}/s (1,480 cu ft/s)
  - minimum: 2.08 m^{3}/s (73 cu ft/s)
  - maximum: 429 m^{3}/s (15,100 cu ft/s)

The Beaver River, also known as the Beavermouth Creek or Beaver Creek, is a tributary of the Columbia River in British Columbia, Canada, joining that river in the Rocky Mountain Trench northwest of the town of Golden. It enters the Columbia via Kinbasket Lake.

The Beaver River is the eastern egress from the Rogers Pass and its valley is the route of the Trans-Canada Highway and Canadian Pacific Railway on that side of the pass, and it is located in Glacier National Park. Its lower reaches are officially named Beaver Canyon. The pass between the Beaver River and the Duncan River forms the dividing line between the Selkirks and the Purcell Mountains.

A semi-decommissioned hiking trail follows the Beaver from the Trans-Canada highway for much of its length, including now-abandoned spurs to Copperstain Pass and Glacier Circle. The trail no longer receives maintenance from Parks Canada, which closed remaining stream crossings in 2009.

== See also ==
- List of tributaries of the Columbia River
- List of rivers of British Columbia
