= Mount Donkin =

Mountain in the country of Canada

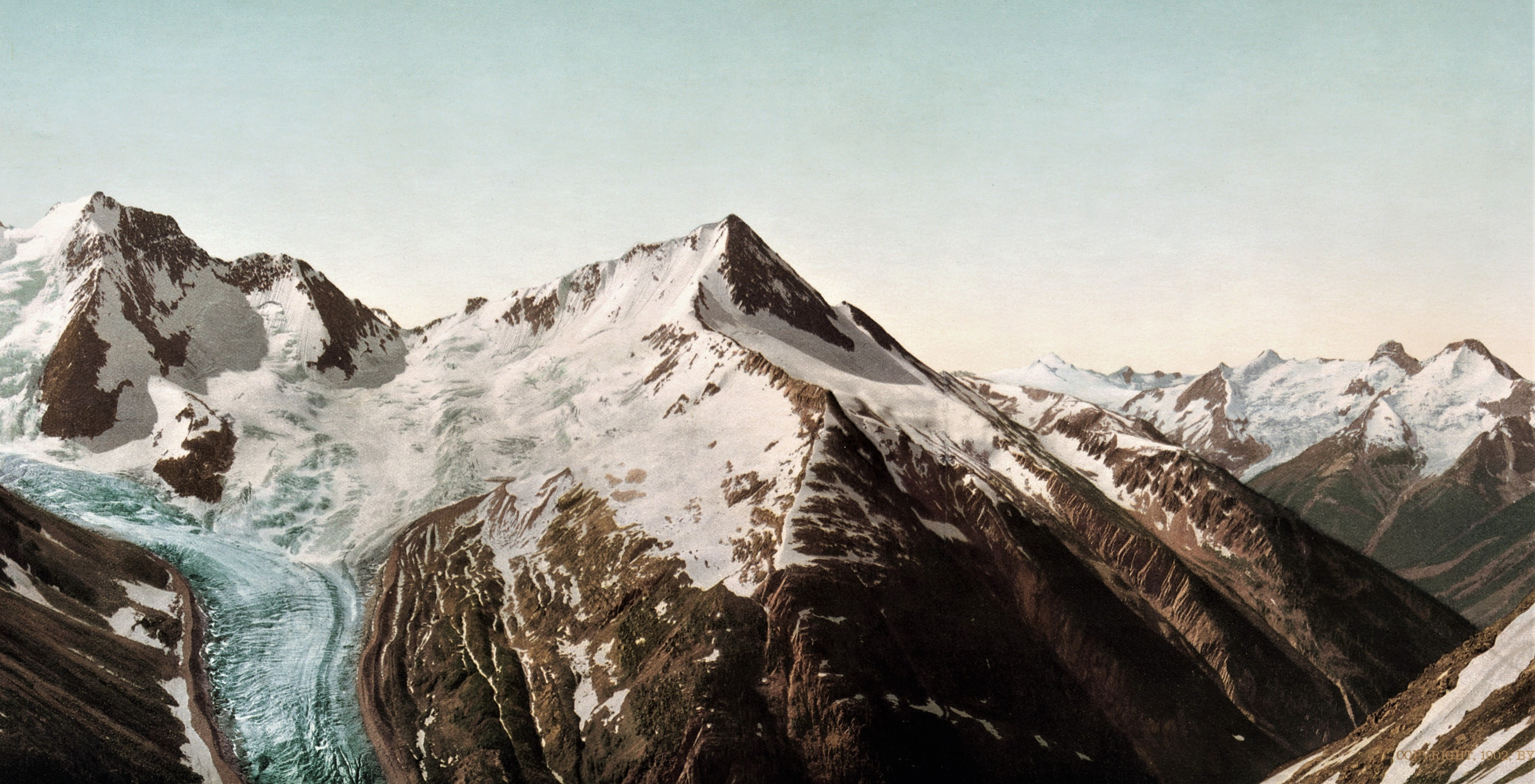
- North aspect centered, with Michel Peak to left

Highest point
- Elevation: 2,940 m (9,646 ft)
- Prominence: 345 m (1,132 ft)
- Parent peak: Mount Dawson (3,377 m)
- Isolation: 1.89 km (1.17 mi)
- Listing: Mountains of British Columbia
- Coordinates: 51°08′59″N 117°28′13″W

Naming
- Etymology: William Frederick Donkin

Geography
- Location within British Columbia Location within Canada
- Interactive map of Mount Donkin
- Country: Canada
- Province: British Columbia
- District: Kootenay Land District
- Protected area: Glacier National Park
- Parent range: Selkirk Mountains; Dawson Range
- Topo map: NTS 82N3 Mount Wheeler

Climbing
- First ascent: 1890

Mount Donkin is a 2,940-metre (9,646-foot) summit in British Columbia, Canada.

== Description ==
Mount Donkin is located in Glacier National Park and is part of the Selkirk Mountains. Precipitation runoff from the mountain drains into tributaries of the Incomappleux River. Mount Donkin is more notable for its steep rise above local terrain than for its absolute elevation. Topographic relief is significant as the summit rises 1,840 metres (6,037 ft) above the Incomappleux River in 2.5 km (1.6 mi). The nearest higher neighbor is Michel Peak on Mount Dawson, 1.89 km (1.17 mi) to the east.

== History ==
While in the Selkirks in 1888, Rev. William Spotswood Green, Alpine Club, London, named this mountain after fellow club member William Frederick Donkin (1845–1888), Honorary Secretary of the Alpine Club, who perished that year in the Caucasus. The nearby Mount Fox was also named in memory of another member of the club, Harry Fox, who also perished with Donkin during their attempt to be the first to climb Koshtan-Tau. The bodies of Donkin, Fox, and their two Swiss guides (Kaspar Streich and Johann Fischer) were never found.

The first ascent of the summit was made in 1890 by Harold Ward Topham, who also has a nearby mountain named after him, Mount Topham.

The mountain's toponym was officially adopted on May 29, 1901, by the Geographical Names Board of Canada.

== Climate ==
Based on the Köppen climate classification, Mount Donkin is located in a subarctic climate zone with cold, snowy winters, and mild summers. Winter temperatures can drop below −20 °C with wind chill factors below −30 °C. This climate supports the Donkin Glacier on the northeast slope of the peak.

== Gallery ==
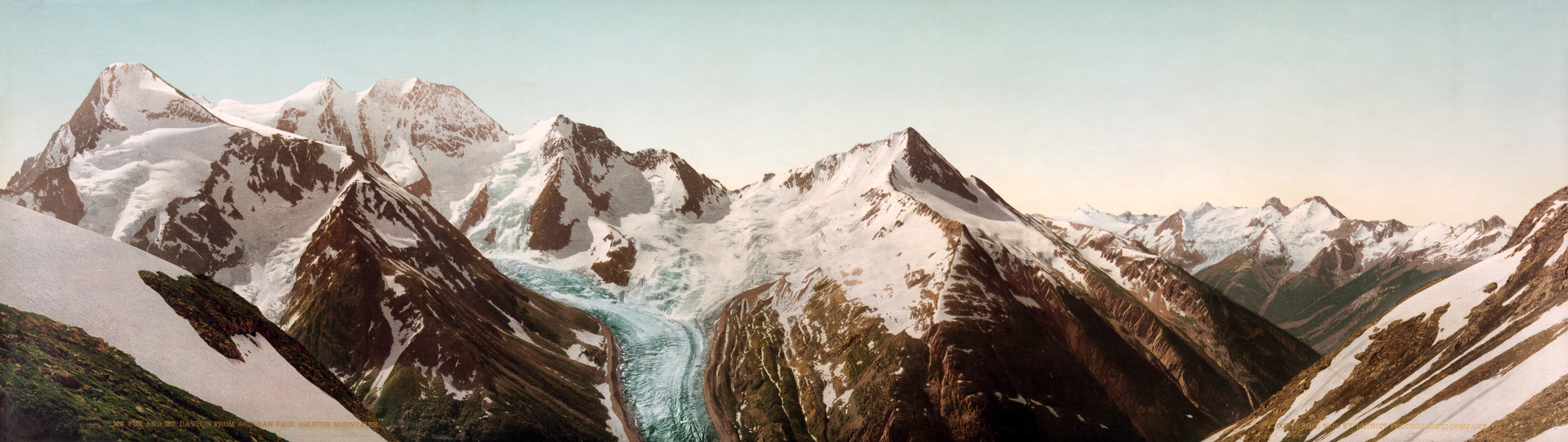
Mt. Fox (upper left), Mount Dawson (in back), Mt. Donkin (right of center). View is from Asulkan Pass near Youngs Peak.

== See also ==
- Geography of British Columbia
