= Tone Dale House =

Coordinates: 50.98500°N 3.24189°W

- Tonedale House
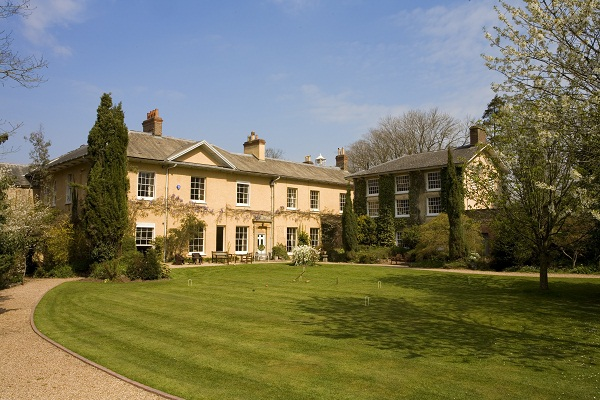
- Interactive map of Tone Dale House
- Location: Wellington, Somerset, England

History
- Built: 1801 or 1807

Site notes
- Owner: Benjamin & Victoria Fox

Listed Building – Grade II
- Official name: Tonedale House
- Designated: 1 July 1976
- Reference no.: 1344790

Tone Dale House (or Tonedale House) is a Grade II listed country house built in 1801 or 1807 by Thomas Fox in Wellington, Somerset, England. Wellington lies 7 miles (11 km) west of Taunton in the vale of Taunton Deane, 1 mile (1.6 km) from the Devon border. Tone Dale House, also known as House of Fox, offers views of Somerset which include the Quantock hills to the north and the Blackdown Hills to the south.

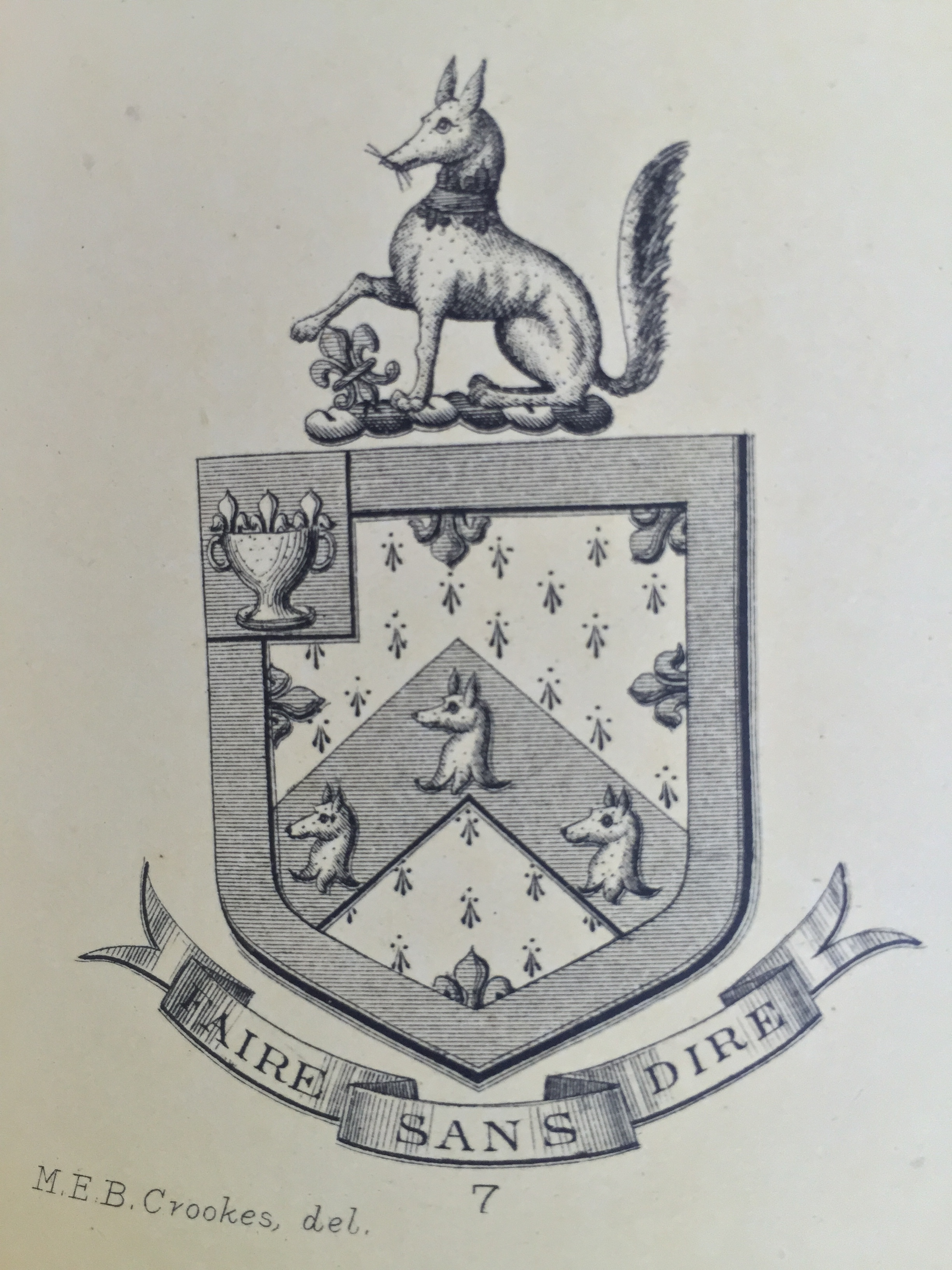
Fox family crest

== History ==
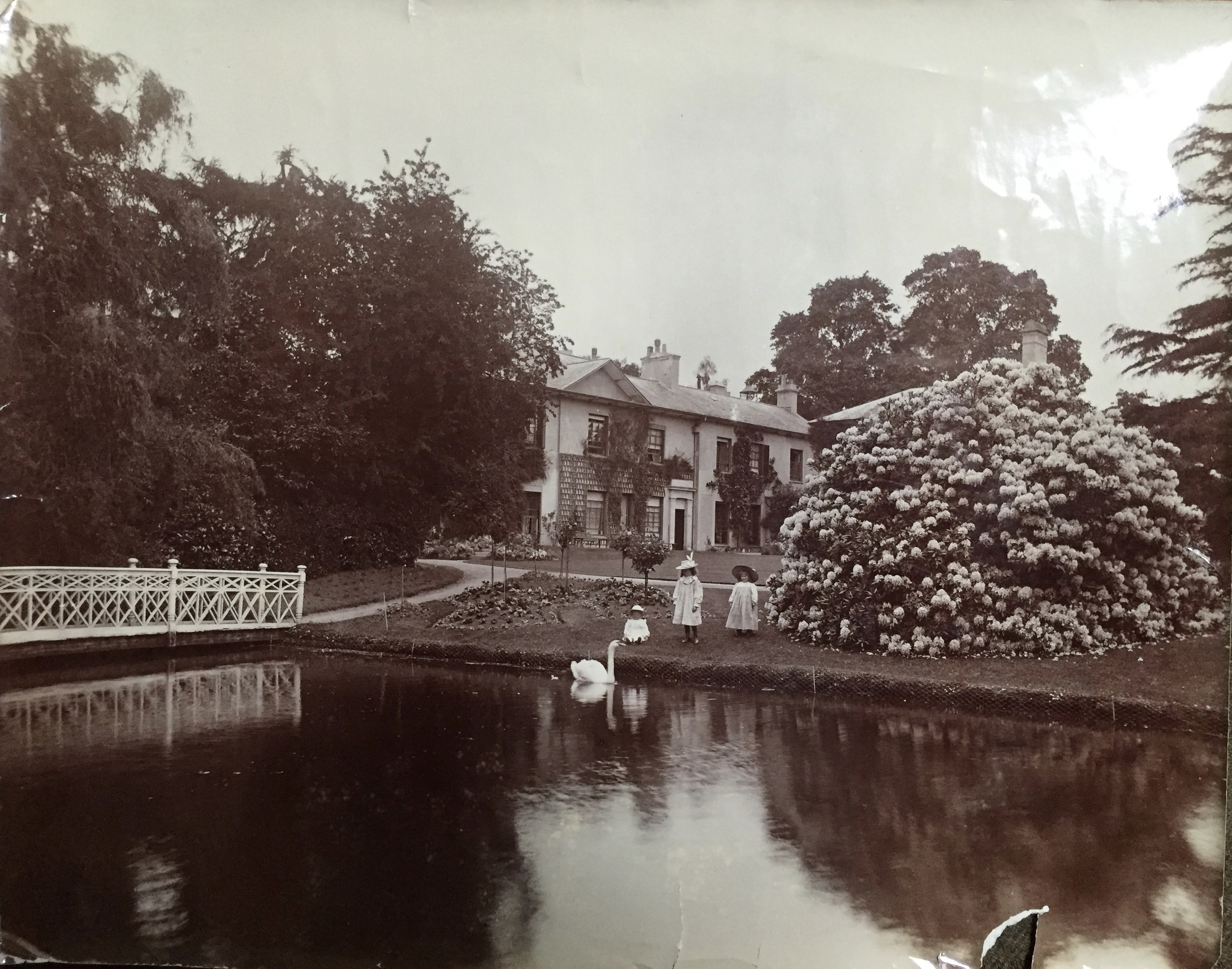
House across Mill Leat

In 1772, Thomas Fox (1747–1821), the son of Edward Fox and Anna Were, became a partner in the family's long-established Fox Brothers textile manufacturing business in Wellington, Somerset. He became the sole proprietor in 1796 and changed the company's name. Their main production sites were Tonedale Mills and Tone Works in Wellington and Coldharbour Mill Working Wool Museum, Uffculme, Devon. "It was the practice...for many well-to-do manufacturers and merchants to build fine houses in the country, becoming country gentlemen themselves, their ladies priding themselves on their idleness." Thomas Fox and his wife Sarah, however, built their Palladian Villa house in 1801 or 1807 beside their woollen mill.

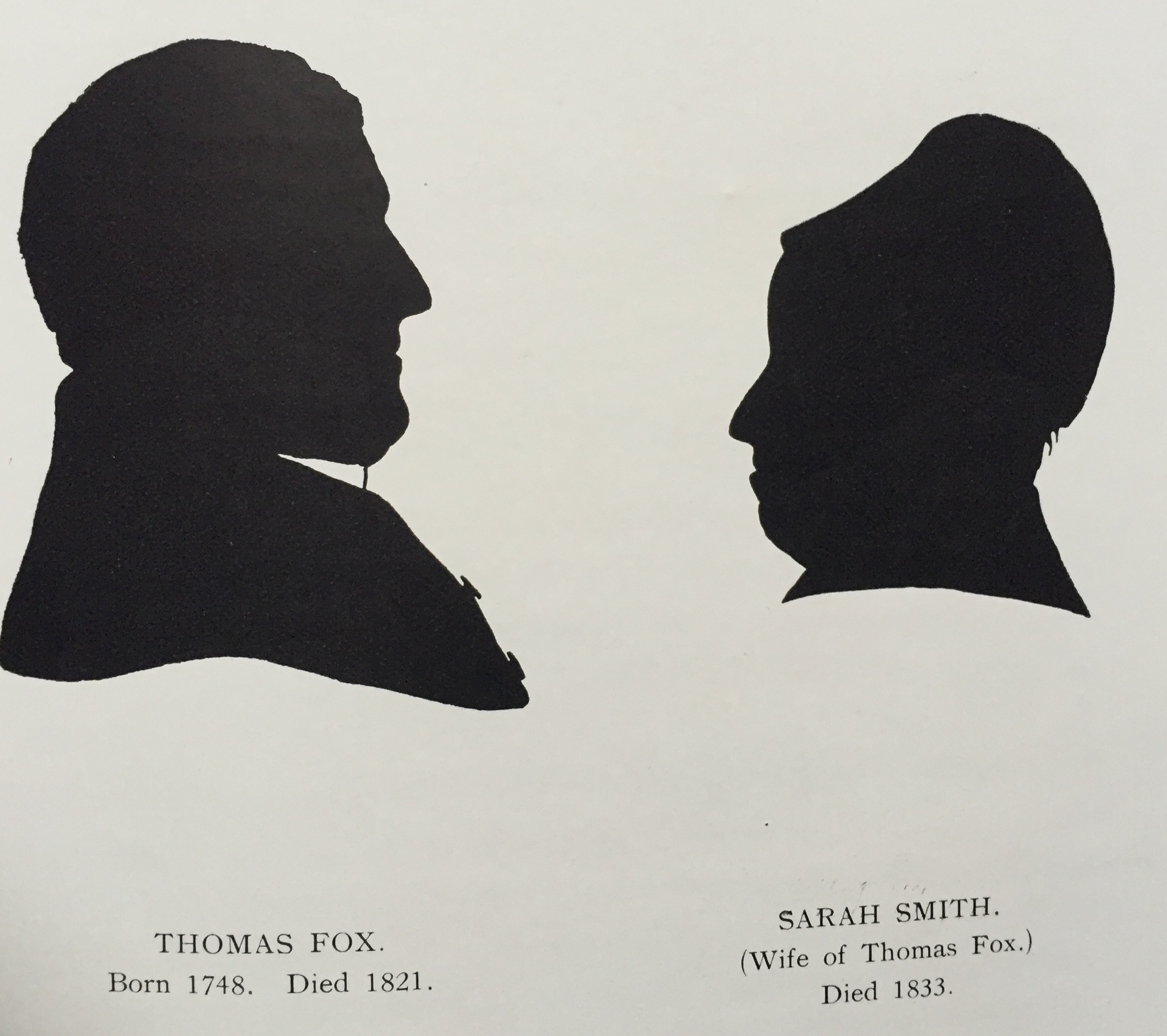
Thomas and Sarah Fox

== Thomas Fox ==
Edward Fox (1719–1782) was married to Anna Were (1722–1788), whose family had long been established as textile manufacturers in Wellington in the county of Somerset. Their son, Thomas (17 January 1747 – 29 April 1821) became a partner in his grandfather Thomas Were's firm, Were and Co., and married Sarah Smith, the daughter of Thomas Smith, a London banker. They had 15 children, of whom seven sons and three daughters survived to adulthood.

The sons who participated in the family business were:

- Thomas (1786–1862)
- Edward (1789–1845)
- Sylvanus (1791–1851)
- Samuel (1794–1874)
- Henry (1800–1876)
- Charles (1801–1860)

The Wellington Fox family is descended from Francis Fox of St Germans by way of Edward Fox of Wadebridge. The history of the family was documented by Charles Henry Fox in Chronicles of Tonedale: Two Centuries of Family History (1879).

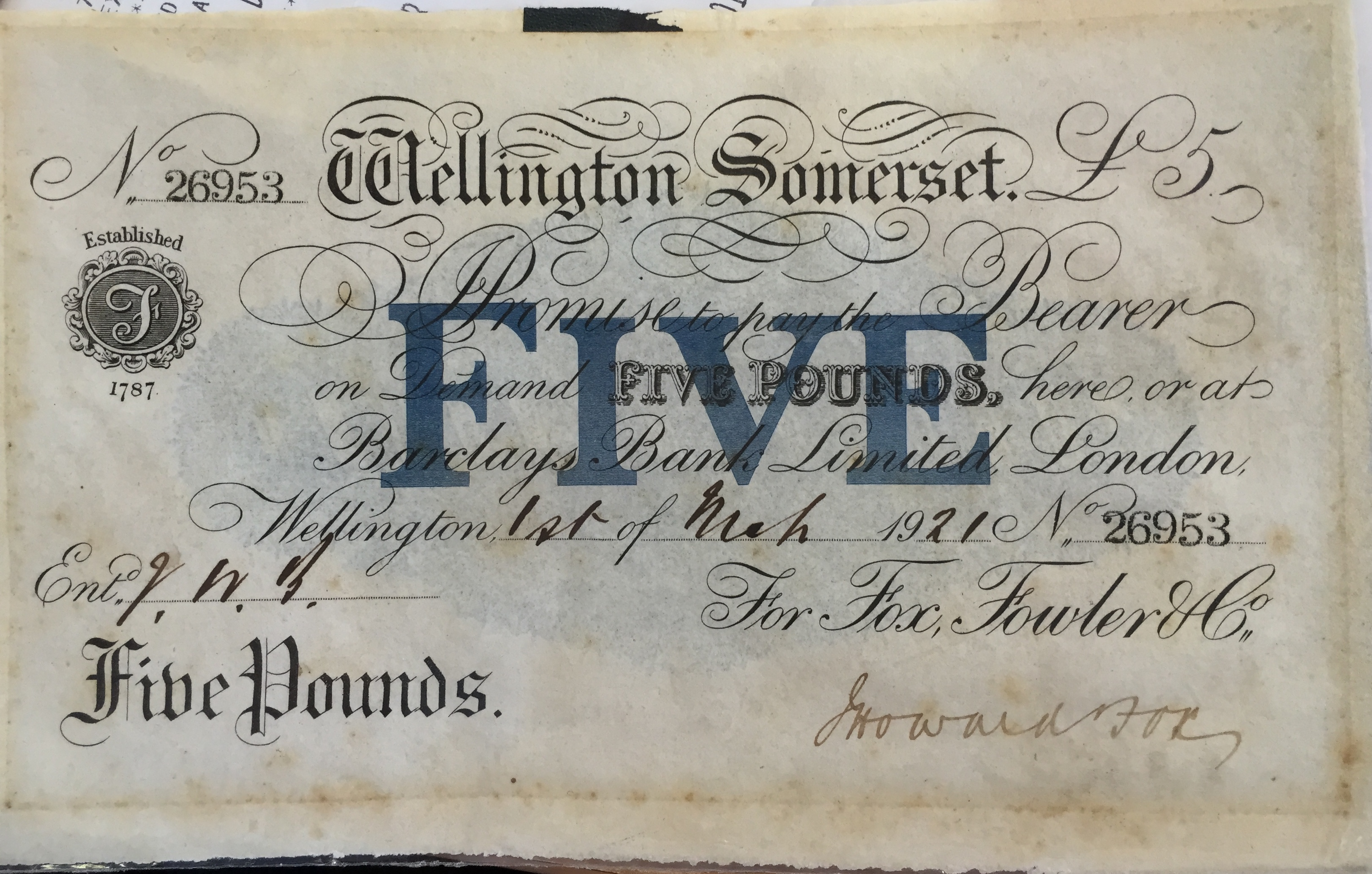
Fox, Fowler Bank of Wellington £5 note

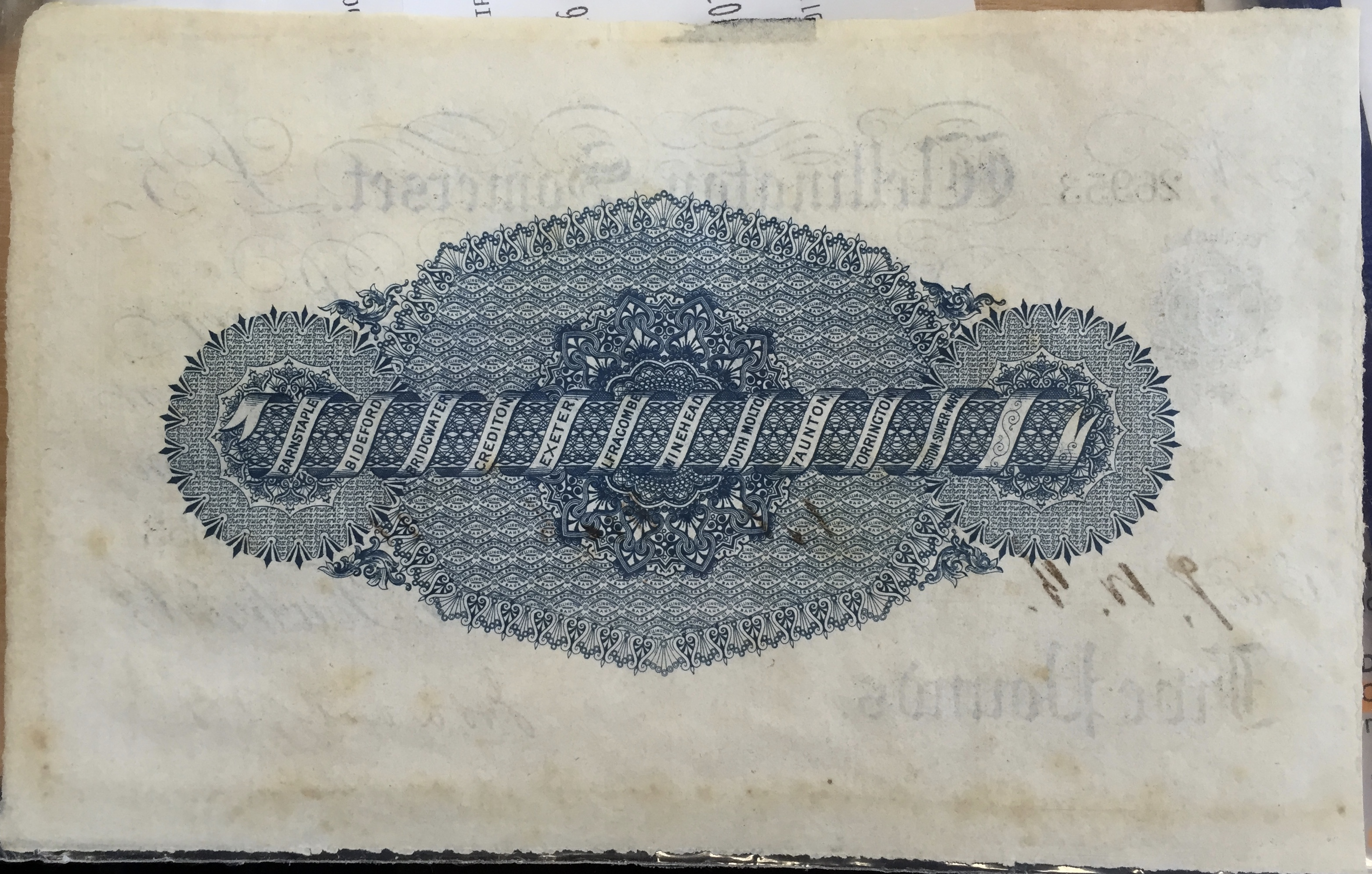
Back of £5 note depicting bank branch names

== Fox Fowler & Co. Bank ==
Thomas Fox started the Fox, Fowler and Company bank in Wellington which rapidly expanded and ran successfully, until it merged with Lloyds Bank in 1927. It was the last private bank in England to issue its own notes and they were legal tender until 1964. There are nine notes left in circulation. The British Museum have another example on display. The bank established its Head Office at the old family house in Fore Street, Wellington (today the Lloyds Bank branch) – they opened branches at Wellington, Exeter, Crediton, Minehead, Taunton, Bridgwater, Weston-super-Mare, Torrington, Bideford, Barnstaple, Ilfracombe and South Molton.

The original £5 note is on display at Tone Dale House – one of the last nine and possible the only one left uncanceled.

Many of the hundreds of banks in the country in the early 19th Century issued notes for use in their locality. In Wellington, the Fox Bank issued its own notes as early as 1787. But the 1844 Bank Charter Act effectively gave a monopoly of bank note production in England and Wales to the Bank of England, although other banks that issued notes were allowed to continue issuing them until they were taken over or went out of business.

By the 1920s the viability of small regional banks was threatened by the strength of the then five major national banks. Although the Fox Bank had deposits of about £3,500,000 and more than 50 branches. John Howard Fox began talks with Lloyds Bank in early 1921 and a takeover was completed later that year. Significantly, his mother was a relative of Howard Lloyd, a director of Lloyds Bank from 1906 to 1920. John Howard Fox became a director of Lloyds Bank and remained on the board until 1949.

In its lifetime, the Fox Bank issued a few £1 notes, 26,998 £5 notes, some 5 guinea (£5.05) notes, 200 £10 notes and 2,155 £20 notes. The later issues were traditional in design, similar to the Bank of England notes of the era. The final batch of Fox notes, 100 £5 notes with serial numbers 26901 to 26988 was issued in 1921 as presentation notes for bank branches and individuals. Those notes all have the date 1 March 1921 and are the last legal tender bank notes ever issued by a commercial bank in England and Wales. They were all marked 'canceled' either by a rubber stamp or perforations. Two notes, number 26999 issued to Gerald Fox and number 27000, issued to John Howard Fox, were marked 'Issued as a specimen'.

Very few of the Fox banknotes are known to survive today – perhaps a dozen or so of the £5 notes. All the rest were burnt when no longer legal tender or were lost. Wellington Museum has a facsimile of a £5 note that is generally on display. Two of the last banknotes are housed at The House of Fox (Tone Dale House) in Wellington.

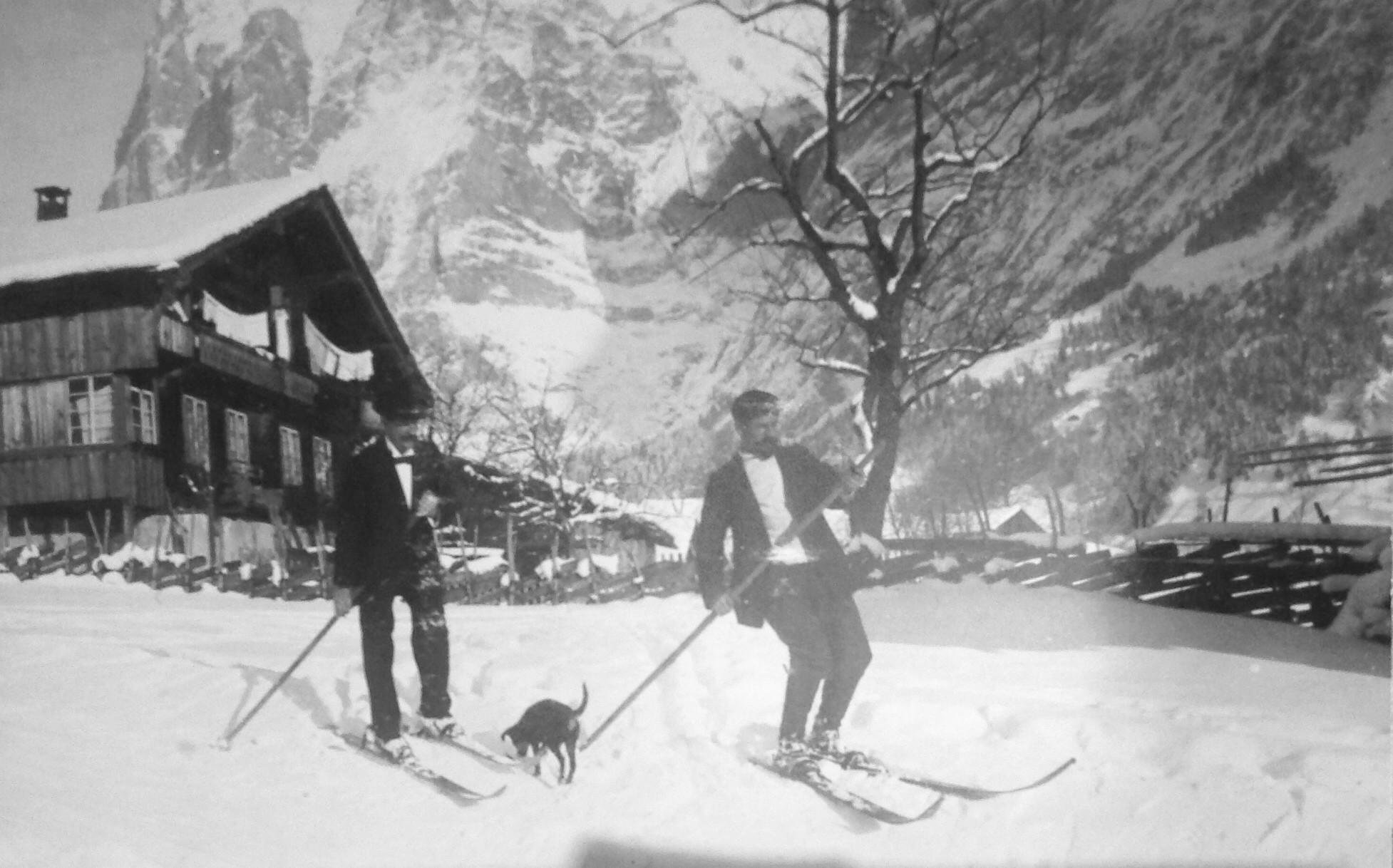
Gerald Fox on the downhill skis in 1891

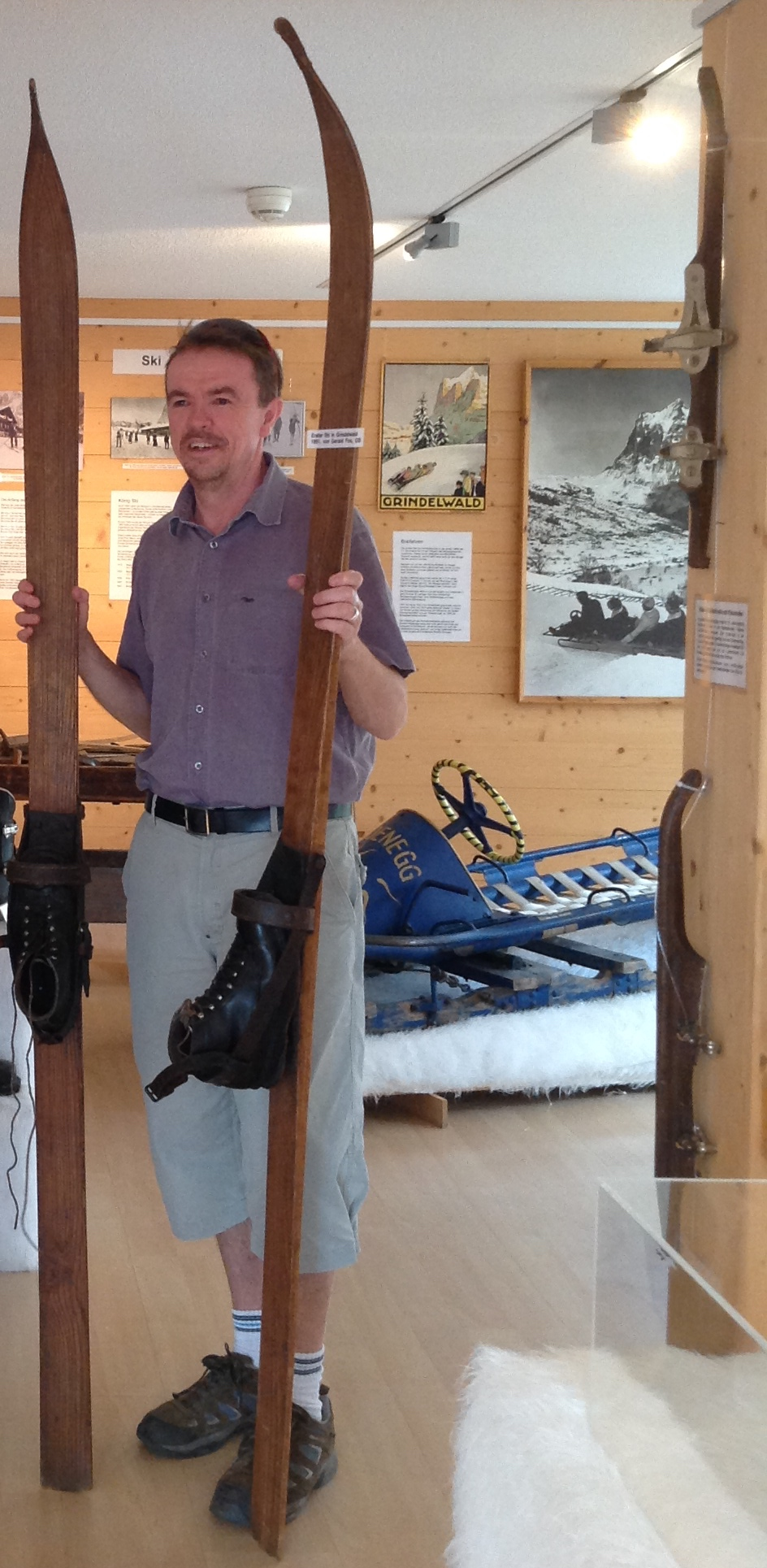
Ben Fox with the original Gerald Fox skis at Grindelwald, Switzerland in 2014

== Fox skis ==
The first person to ski in Grindelwald, Switzerland was Englishmen Gerald Fox (who lived at Tone Dale House) who put his skis on in his hotel bedroom in 1891 and walked out through the hotel bar to the slopes wearing them.

In January 1891 Gerald Fox and his cousin Thomas Fox brought the first skis to Grindelwald from Norway where they had learned to use them. Although not the first skis seen in Switzerland, they were the first in the Bernese Oberland. For some years the old Baer Hotel had had winter visitors who skated, curled and tobogganed. The Foxes were regarded as slightly mad as they demonstrated their skis. They put them on indoors and skied out of the hotel entrance, using a single long pole. Neither the guests nor the local inhabitants saw a future for this sport, though they conceded that it was quite a good way of getting about compared with snow shoes. However, some of the local youths were prevailed upon to learn the rudiments and, though the sport did not catch on immediately, there was thus a nucleus of keen local inhabitants available to teach the visitors who came in increasing numbers as the years went by.

== Wellington Park ==
In March 1902 a committee was appointed by Wellington Urban District Council to examine ways in which land for the creation of a public park or recreation ground could be obtained. The council received a letter from Joseph Fox of Messrs Fox Brothers & Co., offering to donate to the town not only 1.6 hectares of ground including the Beech Grove, but also to lay it out at the company's expense as a public park. Fox Bros appointed Robert Veitch & Sons of Exeter to design and lay out the park, the landscape scheme being provided by F W Meyer. The park was opened to the public at a ceremony held on 2 May 1903.

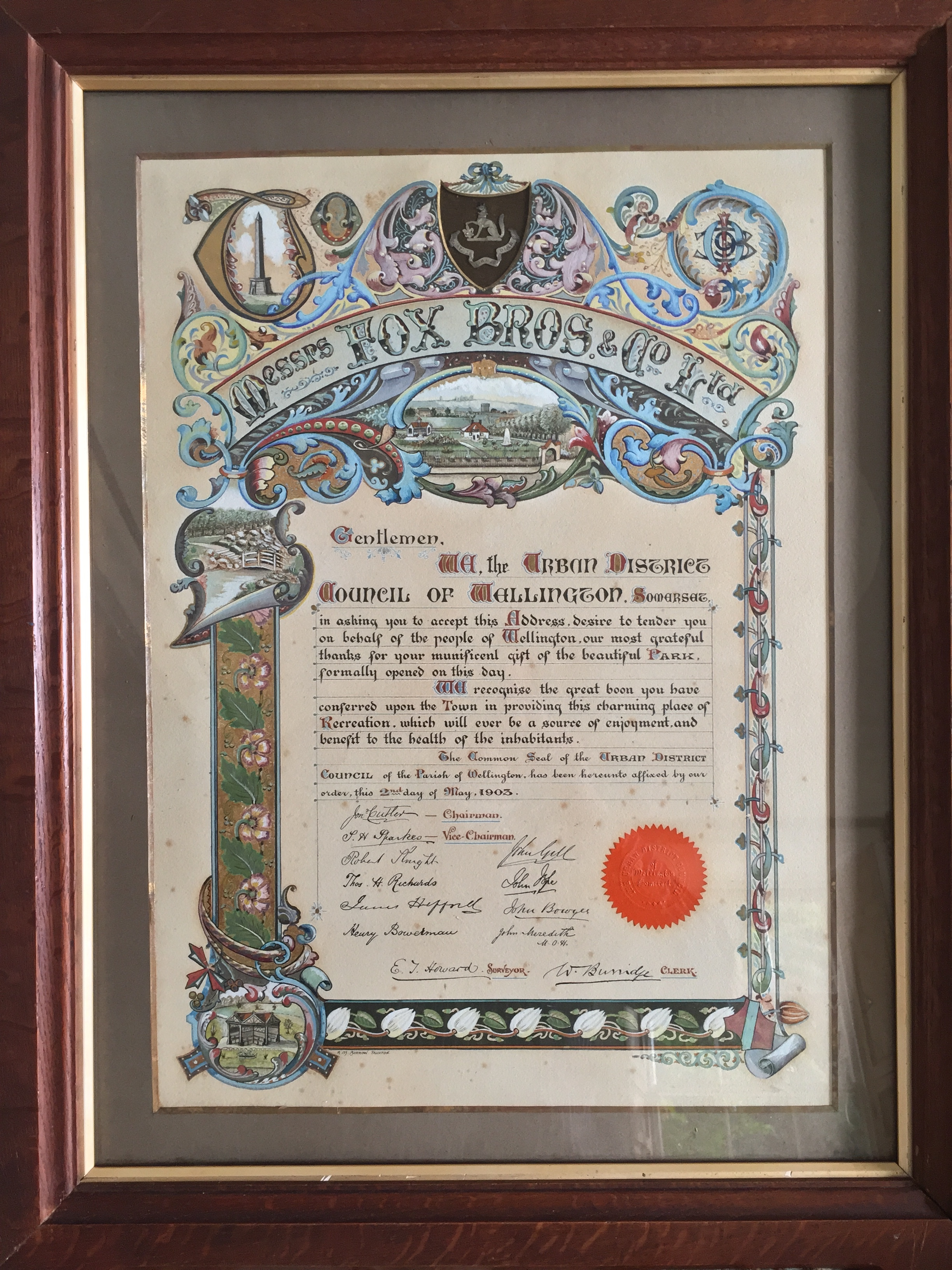
Wellington Park – thank you gift

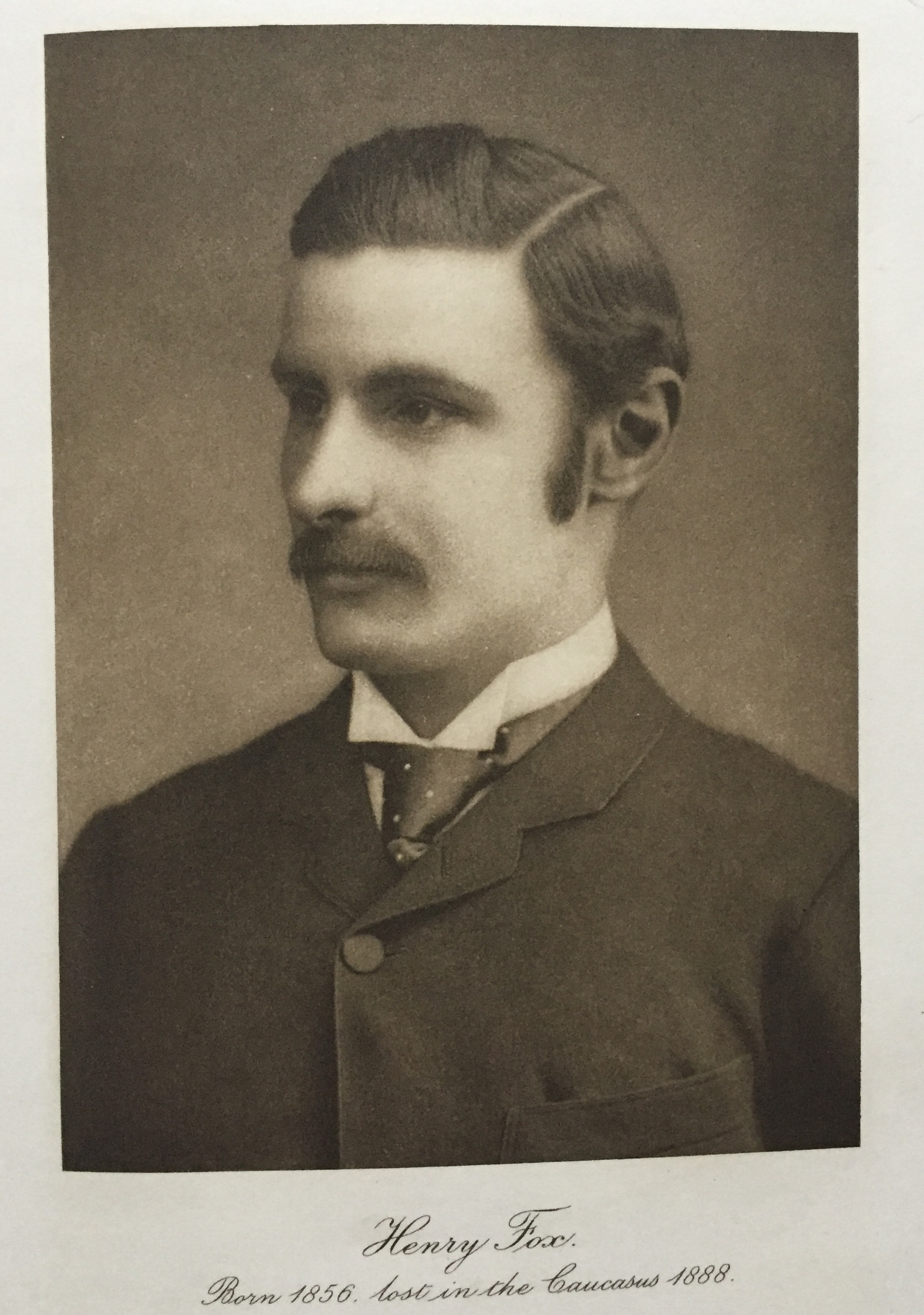
Henry Fox, lost in the Caucasus 1888

== Other Fox family residents ==
=== Harry Fox (Mountaineer) ===
Harry Fox (30 September 1856 – on or after 30 August 1888) was an English gentleman (also lived at Tone Dale House) who was a sportsman and adventurer. He played cricket and rugby for his county, and began climbing mountains in the mid-1880s.

Harry played and financed cricket and rugby in Somerset; he played cricket for Somerset County Cricket Club from 1877 to 1882, and remained as a vice-president of the club until his death. He founded Wellington Rugby Football Club in 1874, and was an administrator and captain of the Somerset Rugby Football Union. After retiring as a rugby player, he continued to take part as an umpire.

In 1884 he started mountaineering, and within two years he was well known in the mountain climbing community, and a well-regarded alpine explorer. In 1888, he travelled with William Frederick Donkin to the Caucasus Mountains in the Russian Empire in a bid to be the first people to climb Koshtan-Tau, but the pair, along with their Swiss guides, died in an accident.

For the purposes of his will, Fox's death was recorded as being "on or since the 30th August, 1888, at some place unknown." The value of his personal estate was just over £7,639, and as he was not married nor had children, his estate was shared between his eldest brother, Charles Dillworth, and his four sisters, Sarah, Anna, Alice and Louisa. A cricket pavilion was erected in his memory at Wellington Cricket Club in Somerset, and a mountain in the Dawson Range in Canada was named Mount Fox in his honour.

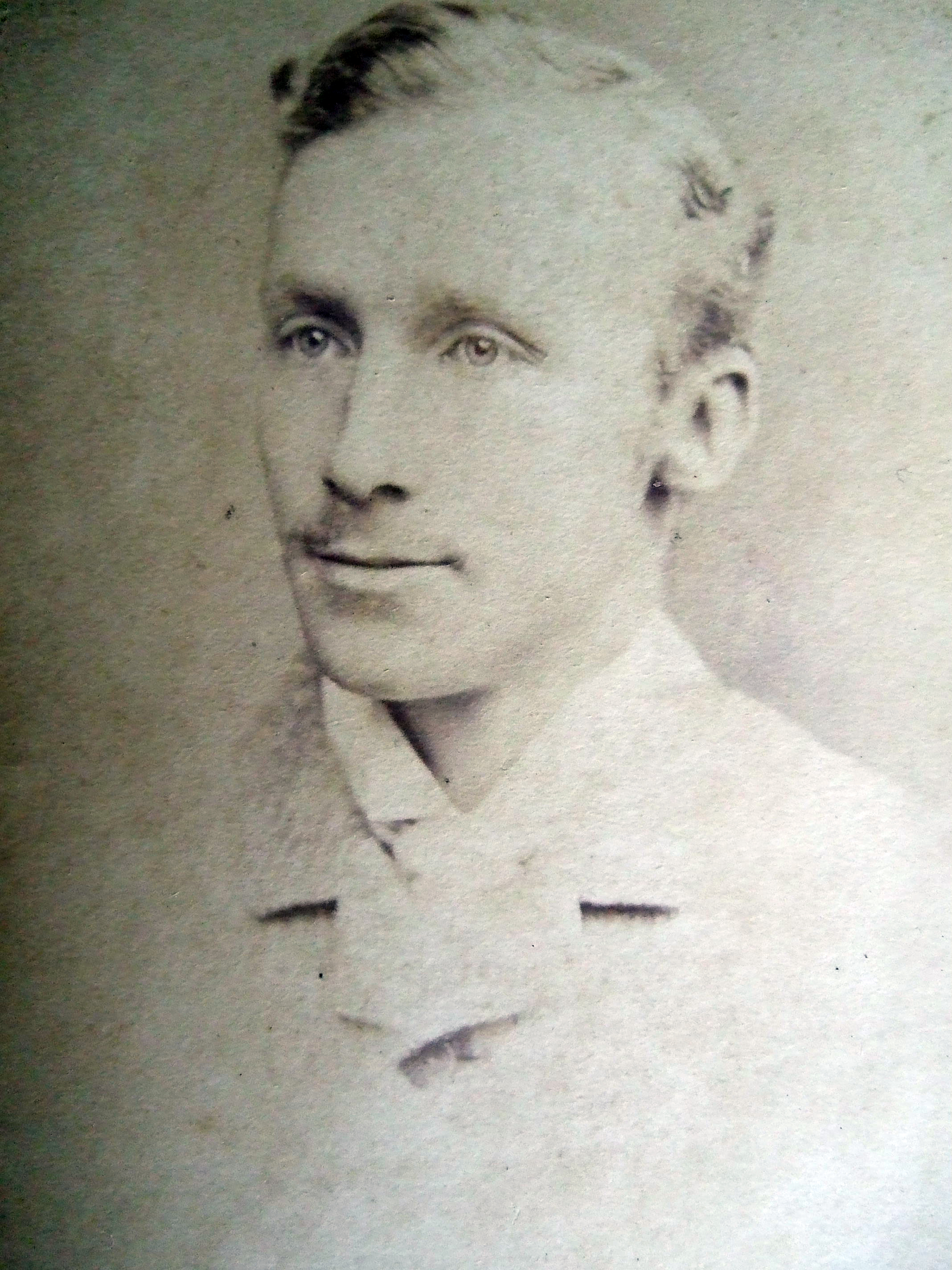
Francis Hugh Fox

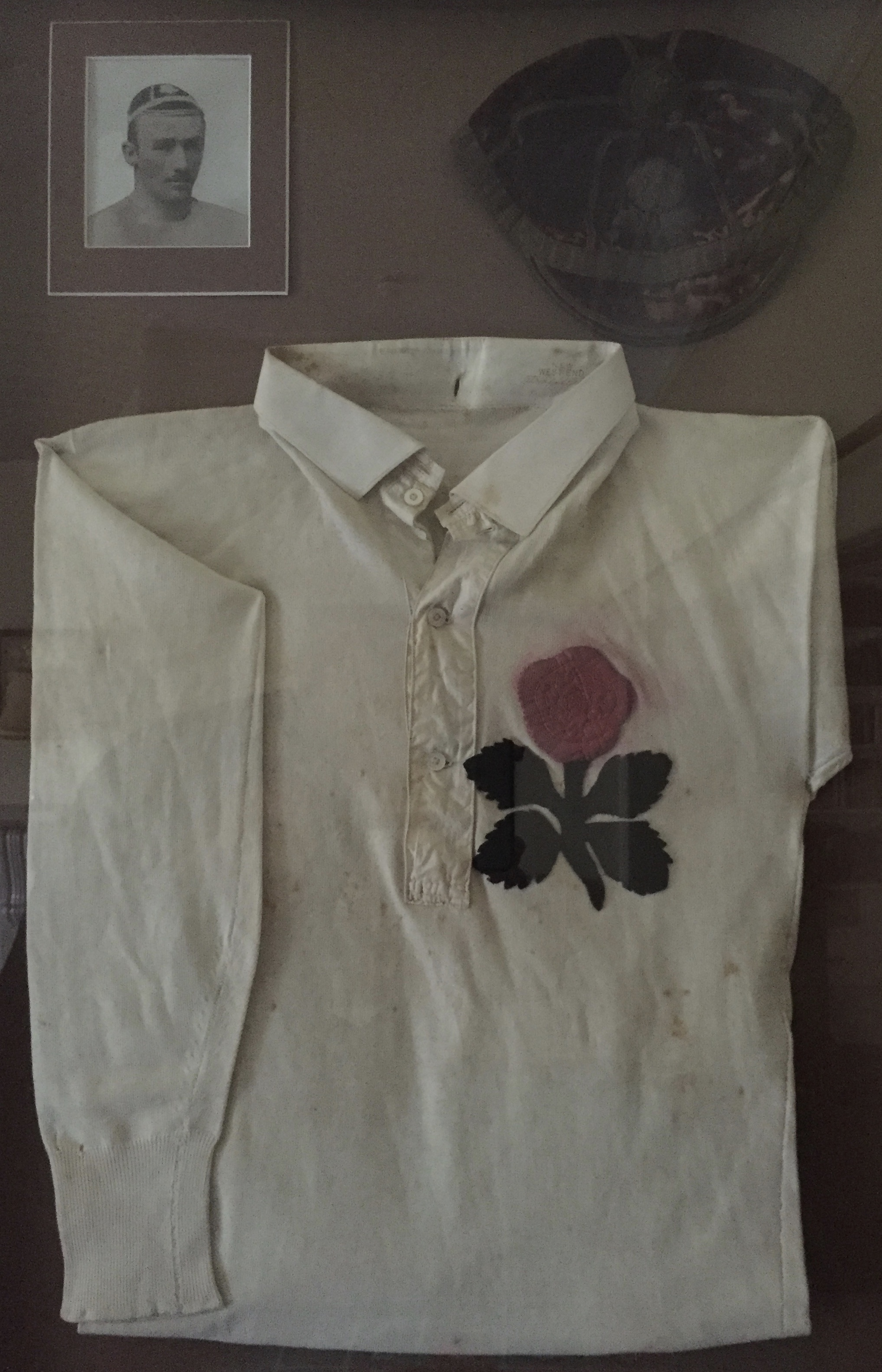
F.H.Fox England XI shirt and cap, 1890

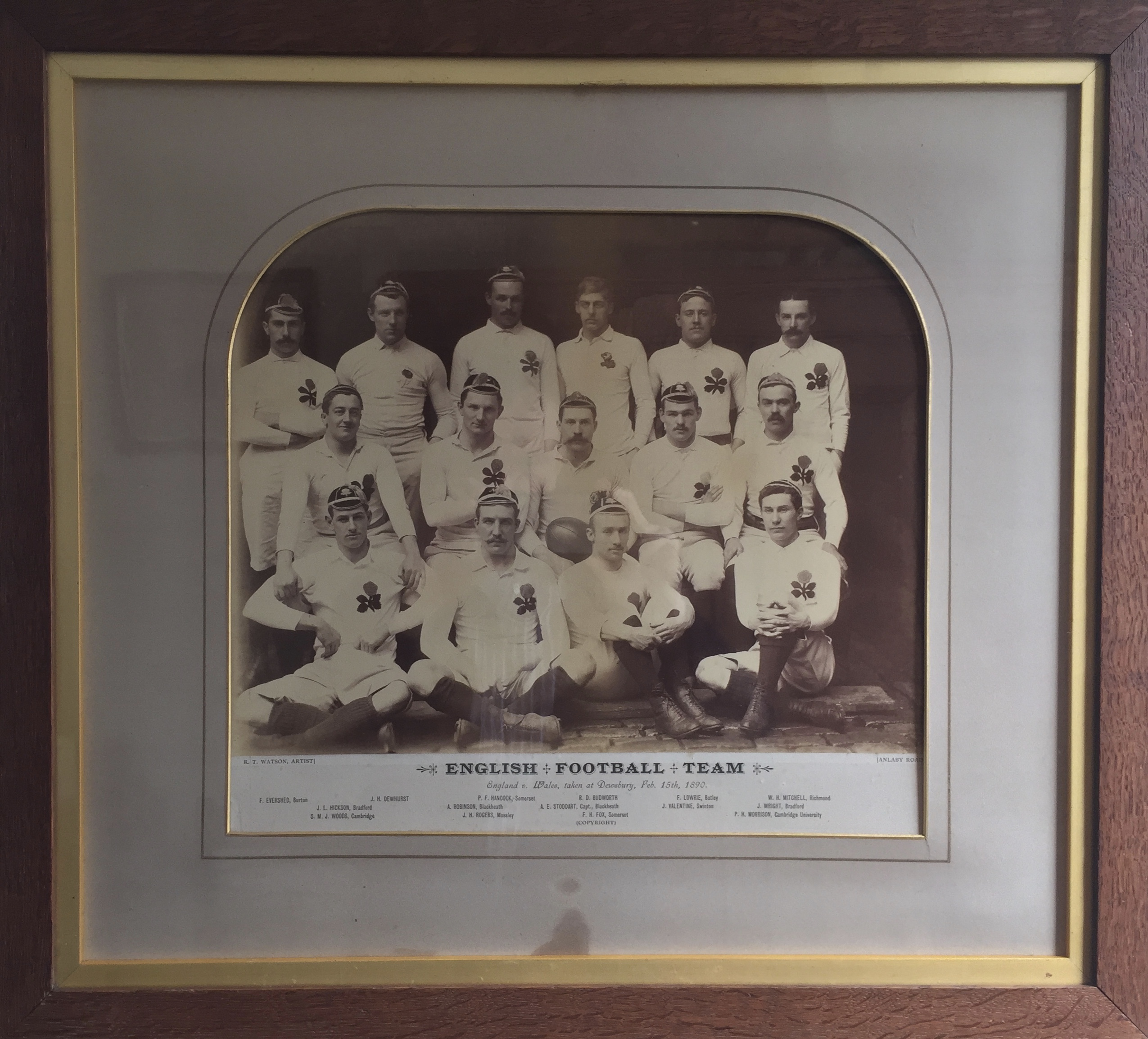
English XI Rugby Team, 1890: FH Fox centre, front row

=== Francis Hugh Fox (England XI Rugby Football Captain) ===
Francis Hugh Fox (12 June 1863 – 28 May 1952) was an English rugby union forward who played club rugby for Wellington and the Marlborough Nomads and international rugby for England. In 1890 Fox became one of the original members of the Barbarians Football Club. Fox first came to note as a rugby player when he represented Wellington RFC, a team club from his home at Tone Dale House, Wellington. At scrum-half; captaining England in its win over Scotland in 1890. He turned down his third cap because of the firm's stocktaking! Then he had a knee injury. He became President of the English R.F.U. and visited New Zealand. It may have been due to him that the Maoris played at Wellington in bare feet! His business memoirs cover 50 years of the history of the firm, which, though modestly written, reveal his business sense; especially in the demolition of official bumbledom at the start of World War 1, which led to the firm winning huge orders from the military.

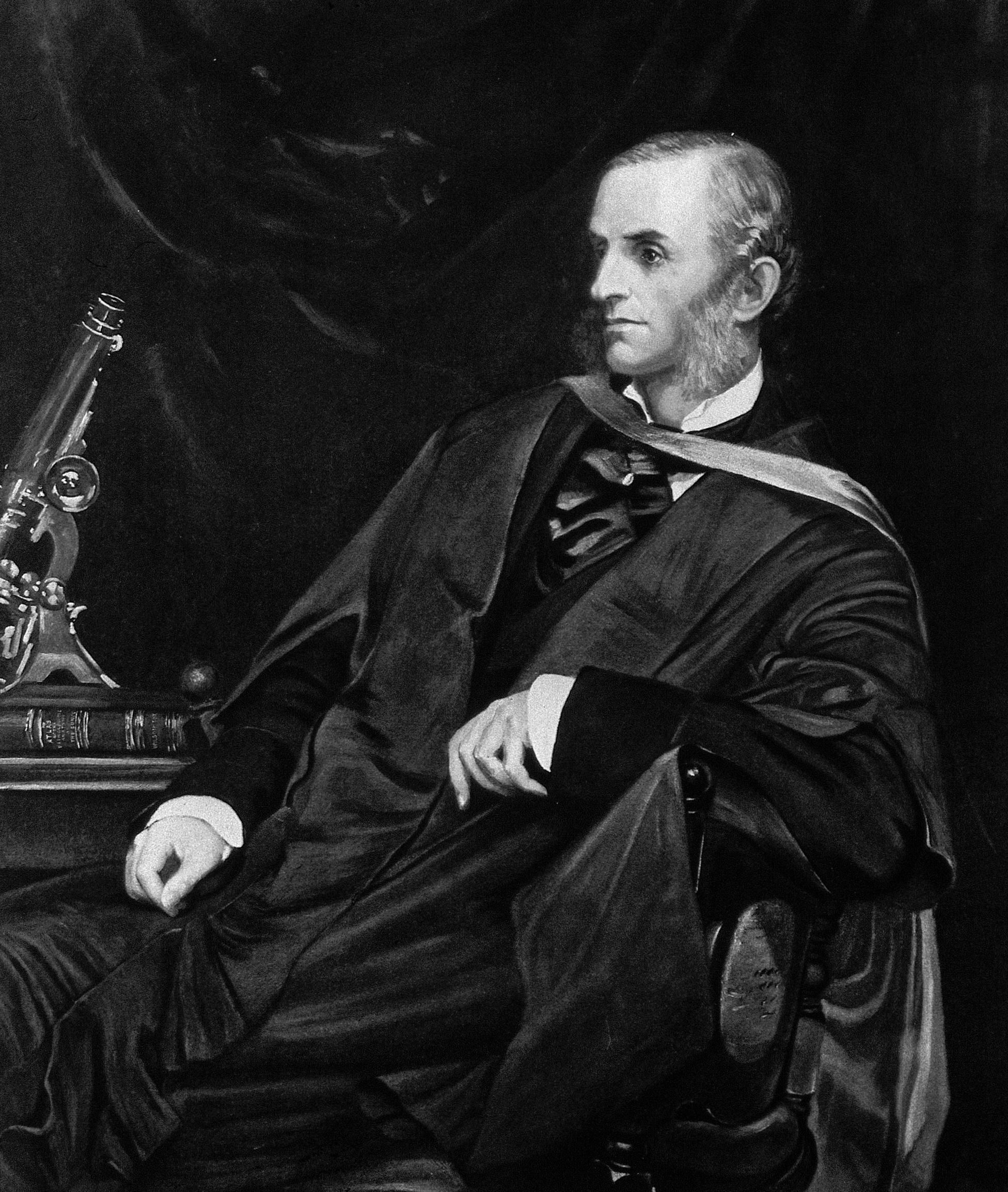
Dr Wilson Fox, physician extraordinaire

=== Dr Wilson Fox (Physician Extraordinaire to Queen Victoria) ===
Wilson Fox (1831–1887) was born at Tone Dale House; he did not live there but visited on several occasions. He was educated at Bruce Castle School, Tottenham, and University College London, graduating B.A. in 1850, M.B. in 1854, and M.D. in 1855, at London University. After a year as house physician at the Edinburgh Royal Infirmary, he passed several years in Paris, Vienna, and Berlin, being for two years in the last city a pupil of the great pathologist Virchow. Here he made important observations on the degeneration of the gastric glands.

In 1859 he married Miss Emily Doyle, and settled at Newcastle-under-Lyme, where he became physician to the North Staffordshire Royal Infirmary. In 1861, supported by Virchow's strong recommendation, he was appointed professor of pathological anatomy at University College, London, and soon afterwards assistant physician to University College Hospital. In 1866 he became fellow of the Royal College of Physicians, and in 1867 full physician to his hospital and Holme Professor of Clinical Medicine. In 1882 he was appointed physician extraordinary to Queen Victoria, and was elected a Fellow of the Royal Society. He afterwards became physician in ordinary, and frequently attended the queen while in Scotland.

== The grounds ==
Tone Dale House is set in 4 acres (1.6 ha) of gardens on the Devon and Somerset borders, 2 miles (3.2 km) from junction 26 of the M5 motorway. "Tone Dale House is a long, low, well-proportioned house, yellow plastered building built in the style of a Palladian Villa. The house faces south; with windows looking out across the gardens to a distant view of the Blackdown Hills, the mill stream flowing slowly by, until it disappears into the shrubbery, where it cascades over the weir." The garden, which is mostly laid to lawn, includes an old tennis house and a two-hundred-year-old Cork Oak tree; all bordered by a ten-foot sandstone wall and the mill stream. The gardens (like Wellington Park) were designed by Robert Veitch & Sons of Exeter with the landscape scheme being provided by F W Meyer.

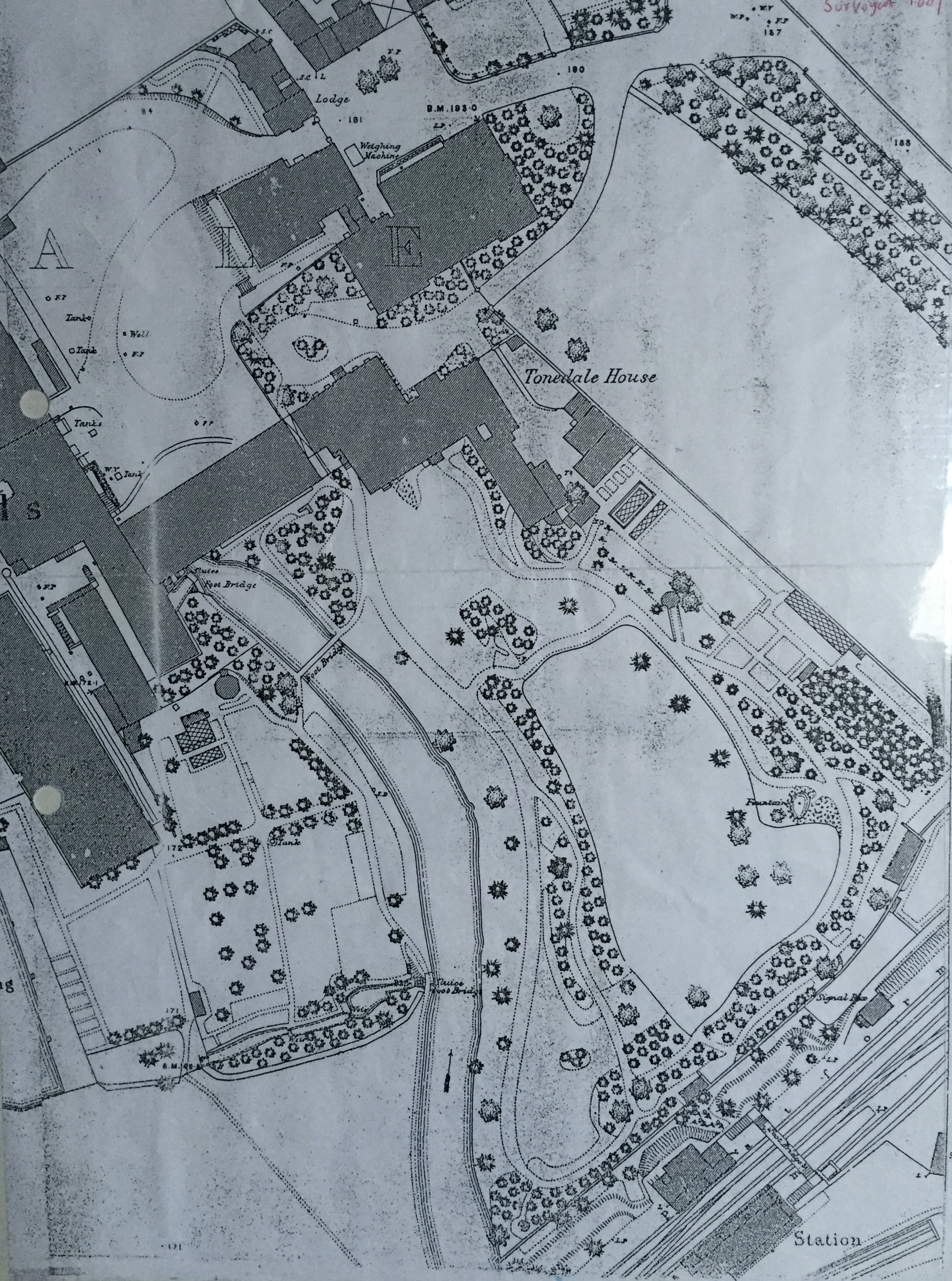
House and grounds plan, 1887

== Present day ==
Today the 16-bedroom Tone Dale House is owned by Ben Fox (former Sales & Marketing Director at Fox Brothers) and Victoria Fox. It is run by the Big House Co and can be hired for celebrations, anniversaries, weddings, parties, holidays, reunions or corporate events. Ben is the great-great-great-great-grandson of Thomas Fox.
