= Harry Fox (disambiguation) =

Harry Fox (1882–1959) was a vaudeville dancer, actor, and comedian.

Harry Fox may also refer to:

- Harry Fox (Hollyoaks), a fictional character
- Harry Fox (sportsman) (1856–1888), English cricketer
- Harry Fox Agency, a copyright collection society

== See also ==
- Henry Fox (disambiguation)
