= Henry Strangways (disambiguation) =

Henry Strangways may refer to:

- Henry Strangways (1832-1920), Premier of South Australia
- Henry Strangways (pirate), a.k.a. Henry Strangwish, 16th-century pirate

== See also ==
- Henry Fox-Strangways (disambiguation)
