= Dawson Range =

Dawson Range may refer to:

- Dawson Range (British Columbia), Canada
- Dawson Range (Yukon), in the Yukon Ranges, Canada
- Dawson Range State Forest, Alberta, Queensland, Australia
