= Henry Fox-Strangways =

Henry Fox-Strangways may refer to:

- Henry Fox-Strangways, 2nd Earl of Ilchester
- Henry Fox-Strangways, 3rd Earl of Ilchester
- Henry Fox-Strangways, 5th Earl of Ilchester

== See also ==
- Henry Fox (disambiguation)
- Henry Strangways (disambiguation)
