= Henry Fox =

Henry Fox may refer to:

- Henry Fox, 1st Baron Holland (1705–1774), British politician
- Henry Edward Fox (1755–1811), British Army general
- Henry Vassall-Fox, 3rd Baron Holland (1773–1840), English politician
- Henry Fox-Strangways, 2nd Earl of Ilchester (1747–1802), British peer and politician
- Henry Stephen Fox (1791–1846), British diplomat
- Henry Watson Fox (1817–1848), English missionary in India
- Henry Fox, 4th Baron Holland (1802–1859), British politician and ambassador
- Henry Fox (soldier) (1833–1906), German soldier who fought in the American Civil War
- Henry M. Fox (1844–1923), American Civil War soldier and Medal of Honor recipient
- Henry Fox-Strangways, 5th Earl of Ilchester (1847–1905), British peer and politician
- Henry Fox (sportsman) (1856–1888), English businessman, sportsman, and adventurer
- Henry Fox (baseball) (1873–1927), Major League Baseball player

== See also ==
- Harry Fox (disambiguation)
