= Wilson Fox =

English physician

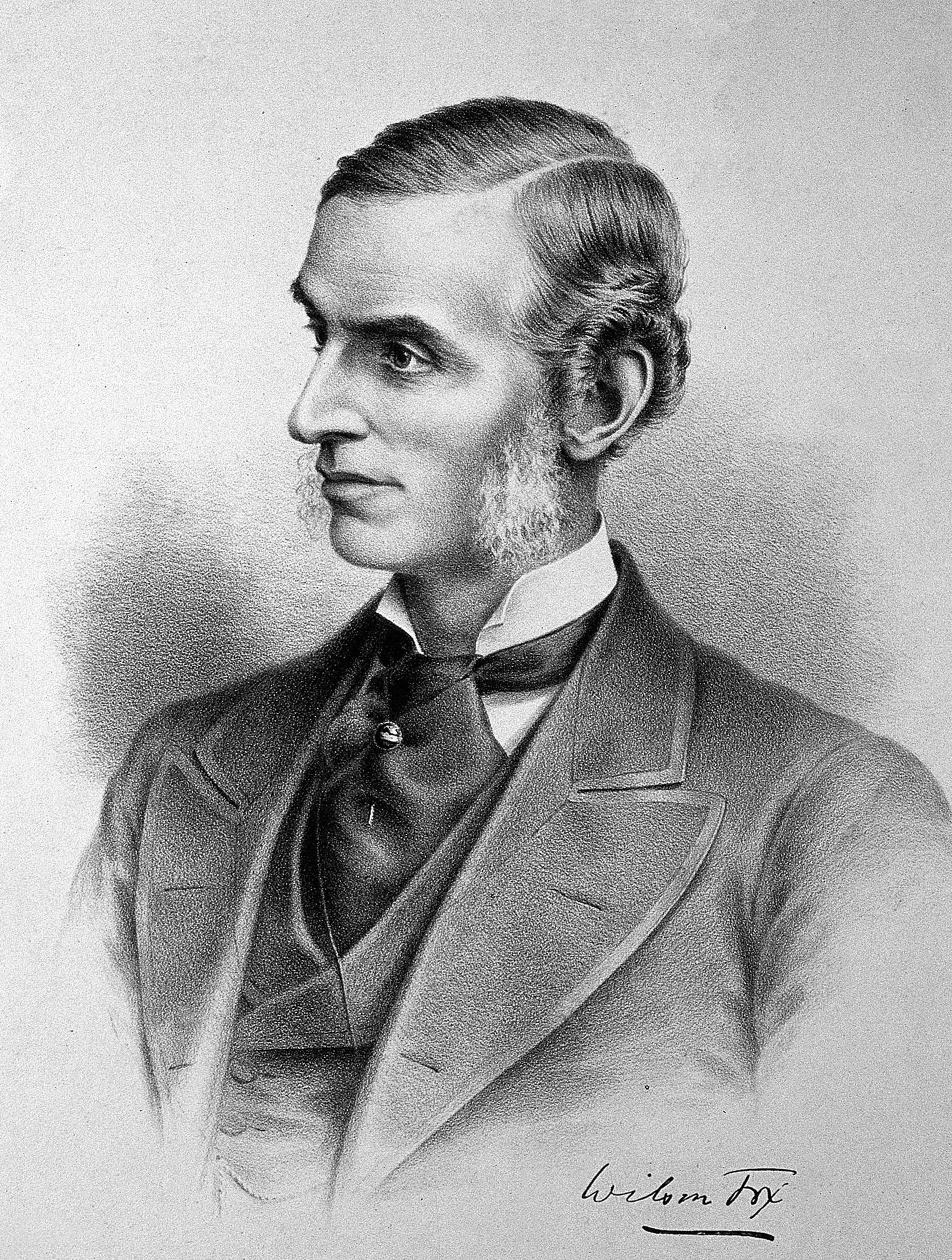
Wilson Fox

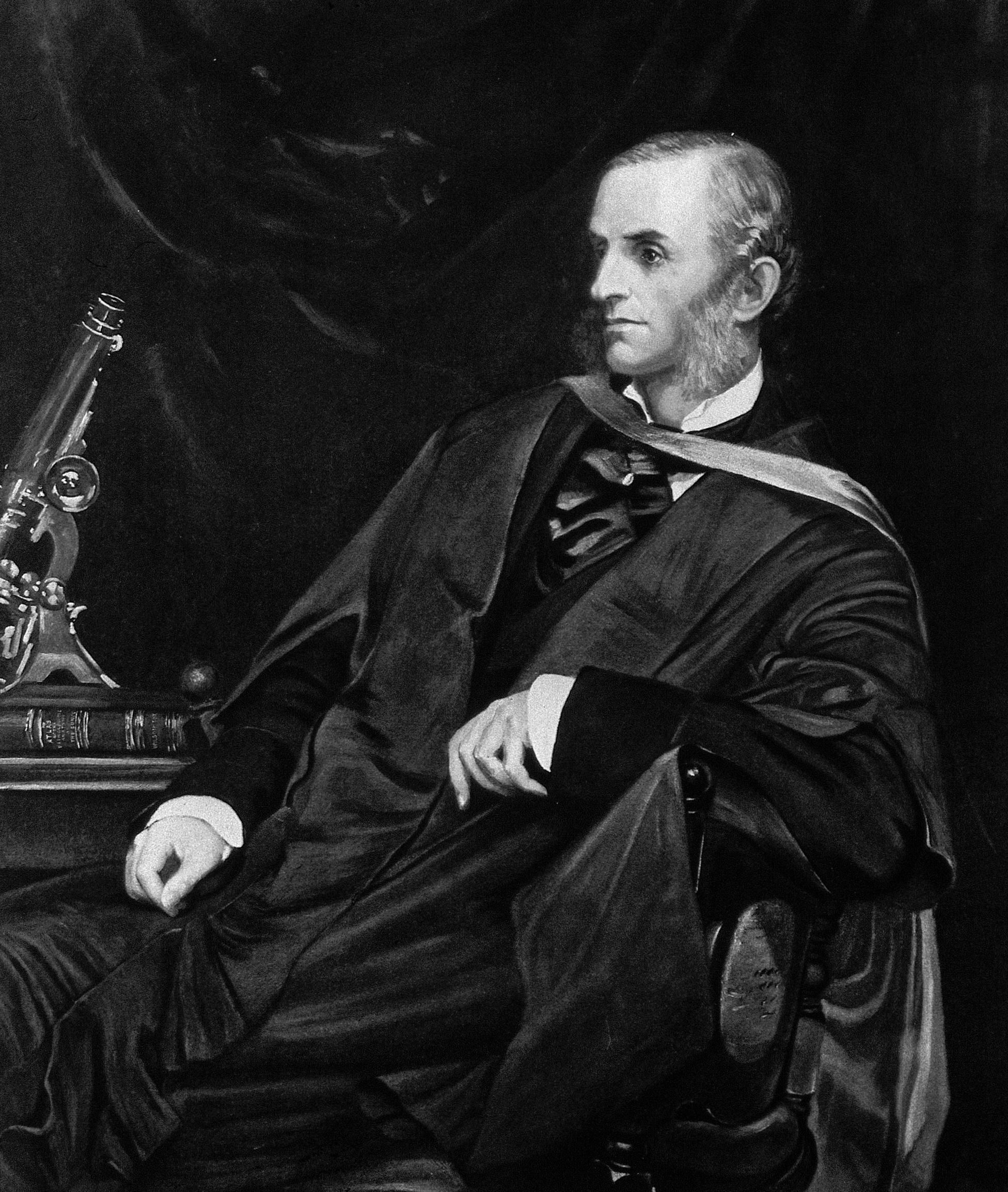
Wilson Fox

Wilson Fox (2 November 1831 – 3 May 1887) was an English physician.

== Education and career ==
Fox was the son of a manufacturer belonging to a well-known Quaker family in the west of England. He was born at Tone Dale House in Wellington, Somerset; he did not live at Tone Dale but he did often visit on several occasions. He was educated at Bruce Castle School, Tottenham, and University College London, graduating B.A. in 1850, M.B. in 1854, and M.D. in 1855, at London University. After a year spent as house physician at the Edinburgh Royal Infirmary, he passed several years in Paris, Vienna, and Berlin, being for two years in the last city a pupil of the great pathologist Virchow. Here he made important observations on the degeneration of the gastric glands.

In 1859, he married Miss Emily Doyle, and settled at Newcastle-under-Lyme, where he became physician to the North Staffordshire Royal Infirmary. In 1861, supported by Virchow's strong recommendation, he was appointed professor of pathological anatomy at University College, London, and soon afterwards assistant physician to University College Hospital. In 1866 he became fellow of the Royal College of Physicians, and in 1867 full physician to his hospital and Holme Professor of Clinical Medicine. In 1870, he was appointed physician extraordinary to the Queen, and was elected a Fellow of the Royal Society. He afterwards became physician in ordinary, and frequently attended the queen while in Scotland. He acquired a large practice, and was an active member of the leading medical societies and of the College of Physicians.

== Personal qualities ==
In personal appearance, Fox was tall, spare, and erect, with a refined expression. Although he was somewhat reserved in manner, his sincerity and earnestness gave him a strong hold on those with whom he came in contact. He was a man of great benevolence, and was in the habit of placing his house at Rydal at the disposal of the Bishop of Bedford during the summer months for the use of invalided East-end clergymen and their families.

Equally as a teacher and as an investigator and writer Fox ranked high. His cases were thoroughly studied, with special attention to the mental and emotional state of his patients, in whom he inspired great confidence. He was the first physician to save life in cases of rheumatic fever where the temperature was excessively high, by placing the patient in baths of iced water. His lectures were highly valued by the students, and the characteristic of his teaching was the ability with which the facts of pathology were made the basis of practical diagnosis and treatment. All his writings manifested great research and labour, and are encyclopædic on their subjects. Besides the works enumerated below, he had been for many years preparing a treatise on diseases of the lungs and an atlas of their pathological anatomy, works that were nearly complete at his death.

== Later life ==
In April 1887, he was suddenly summoned to the deathbed of his eldest brother at Wellington. Thence he went northwards towards his home at Rydal for a rest, but was seized with pneumonia on the way and died on 3 May at Preston, Lancashire. He was buried at Taunton on 6 May 1887. A bust in the Shire Hall, Taunton, was unveiled on 25 October 1888. His first wife died in 1870; by her he left three sons and three daughters. In 1874 he married Evelyn, daughter of Sir Baldwin Wake Walker, and widow of Captain Burgoyne, who was capsized off Cape Finisterre during a gale on 7 September 1870.

His second son was Henry Wilson-Fox (1863–1921), who became a director of many companies in Rhodesia, and a Conservative Member of Parliament (MP).

== Publications ==
Fox's principal writings were:

- On the Origin, Structure, and Mode of Development of Cystic Tumours of the Ovary,’ 'Med.-Chir. Trans., 1864, xlvii. 227–86.
- On the Artificial Production of Tubercle in the Lower Animals, a lecture before the Royal College of Physicians, 1864.
- On the Development of Striated Muscular Fibre, "Phil. Trans." clvi. 1866.
- On the Diagnosis and Treatment of the Varieties of Dyspepsia, 1867; 3rd edition, enlarged, 1872, under the title The Diseases of the Stomach, substantially a reproduction of his articles in Reynolds' System of Medicine, vol. ii. 1868.
- Articles on Pneumonia, &c., in Reynolds's System, iii. 1871.
- On the Treatment of Hyperpyrexia by means of the External Application of Cold, 1871.
