= Youngs Peak (Canada) =

Mountain in British Columbia, Canada

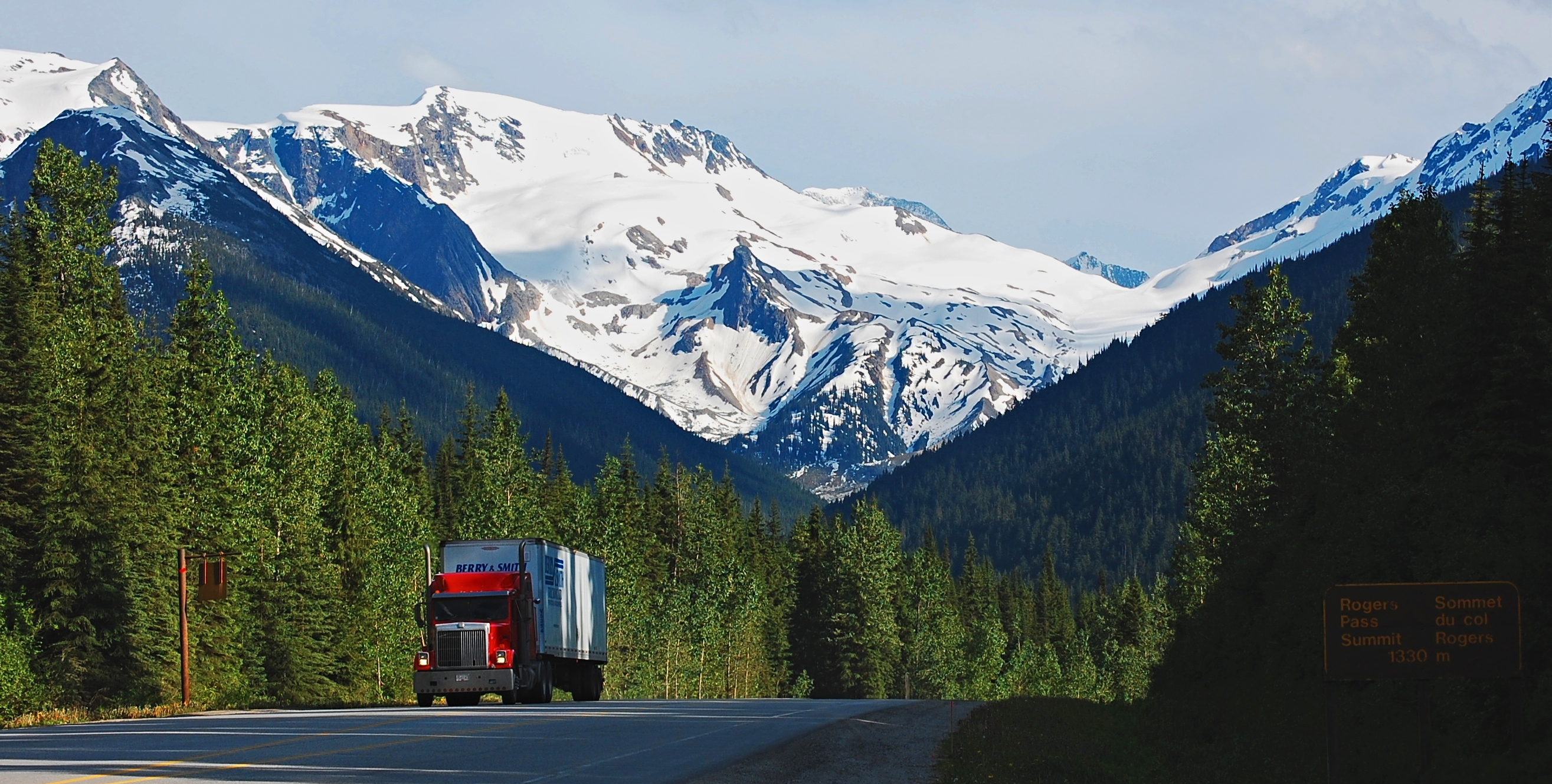
- Youngs Peak from Rogers Pass

Highest point
- Elevation: 2,815 m (9,236 ft)
- Prominence: 285 m (935 ft)
- Parent peak: Mount Fox (3196 m)
- Listing: Mountains of British Columbia
- Coordinates: 51°12′20″N 117°26′52″W

Geography
- Location within British Columbia Location within Canada
- Interactive map of Youngs Peak
- Country: Canada
- Province: British Columbia
- District: Kootenay Land District
- Protected area: Glacier National Parkk
- Parent range: Duncan Ranges; Selkirk Mountains
- Topo map: NTS 82N3 Mount Wheeler

Climbing
- First ascent: 1898, Charles Ernest Fay, Redt F. Curtis
- Easiest route: YDS 4 Scramble

Youngs Peak is a 2,815-metre (9,236-foot) glaciated mountain summit in Glacier National Park, in the Selkirk Mountains of British Columbia, Canada. It is 12 km (7.5 mi) south of Rogers Pass, 58 km (36 mi) northeast of Revelstoke, and 36 km (22 mi) west of Golden. The mountain was first climbed in 1898 by Charles Ernest Fay and Redt F. Curtis. The mountain's toponym was officially adopted February 8, 1977, by the Geographical Names Board of Canada. It is named for Mrs. Julia M. Young (1853-1925), the Glacier House manager from 1899 through 1920.

== Climate ==
Based on the Köppen climate classification, Youngs Peak is in a subarctic climate zone with cold, snowy winters, and mild summers. Temperatures can drop below −20 °C with wind chill factors below −30 °C. This climate supports the Asulkan Glacier on the northwest slope, and the Geikie Glacier on the east slope. Precipitation runoff from the mountain and meltwater from its glaciers drains north into a tributary of the Illecillewaet River, and south into headwaters of the Incomappleux River. The months July through September offer the most favorable weather for viewing and climbing Youngs Peak.

== Gallery ==
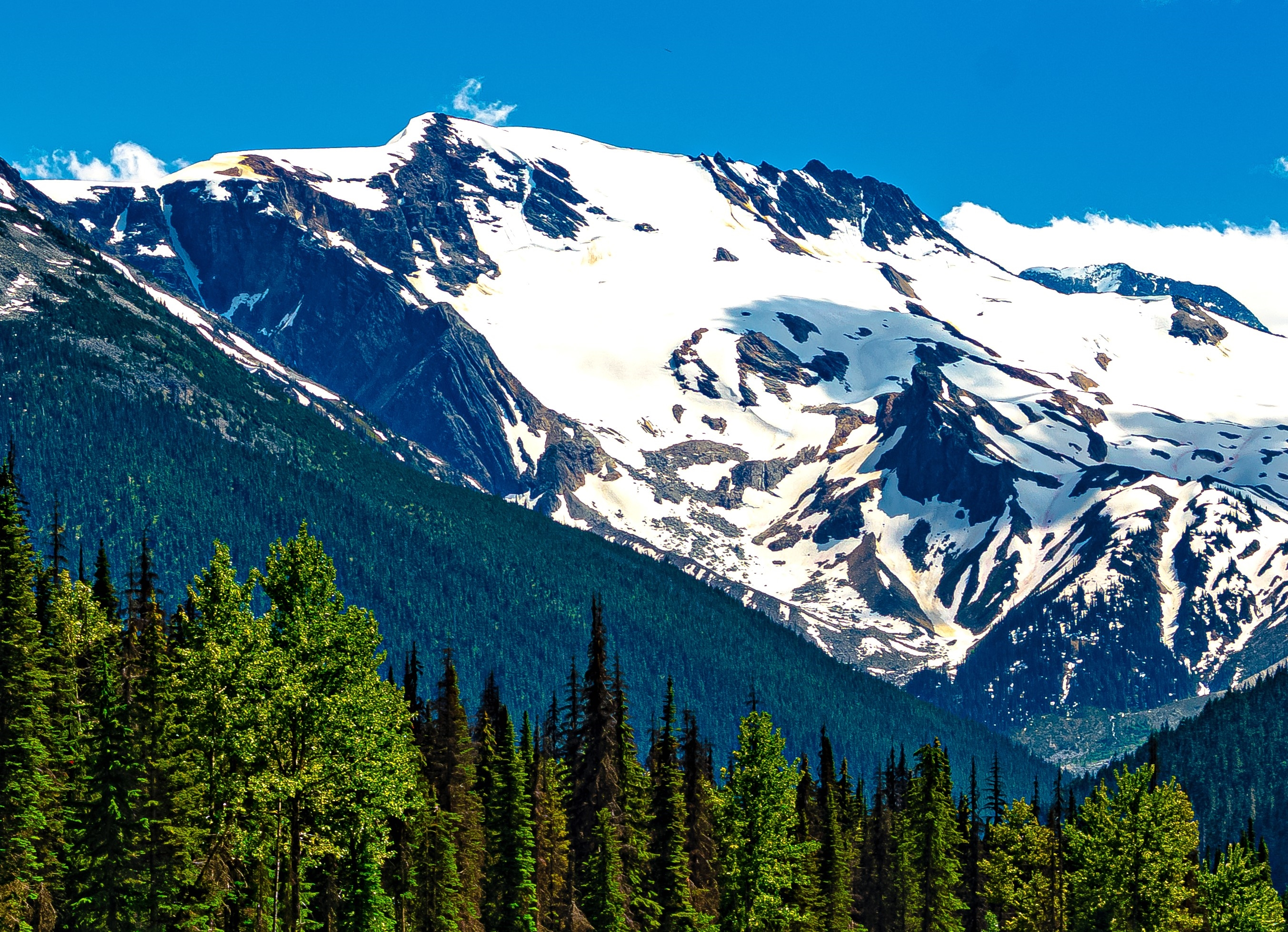
North aspect

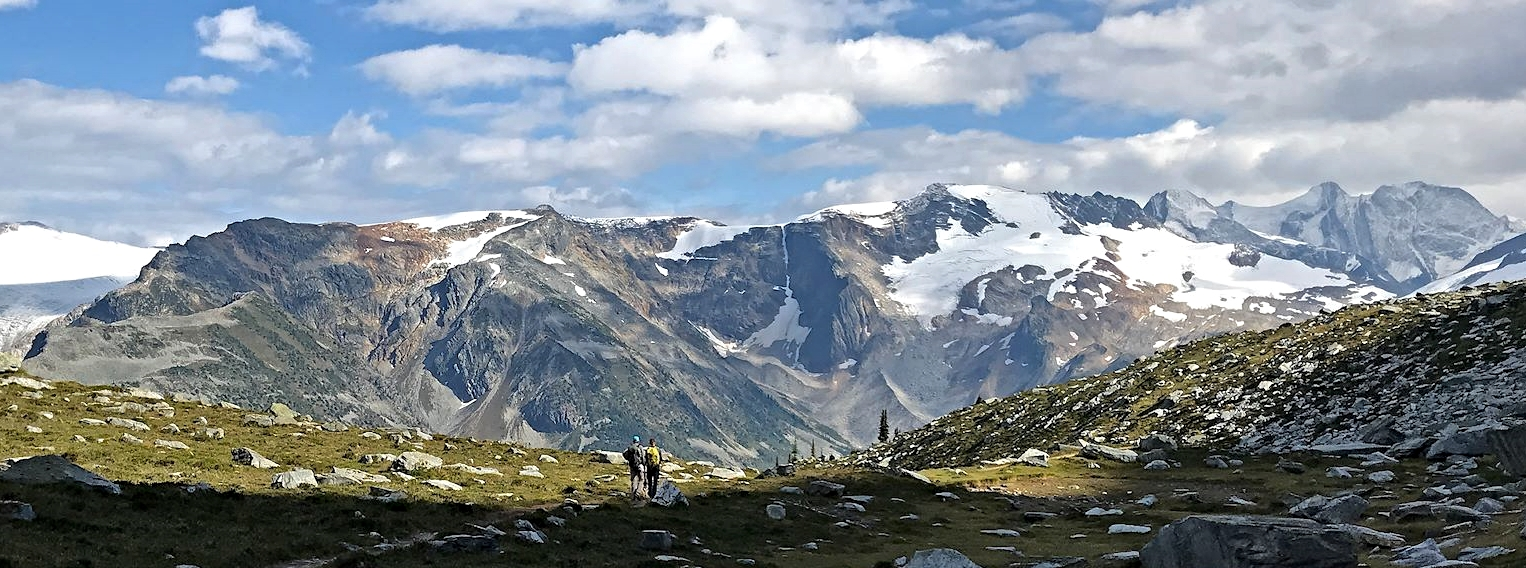
Youngs Peak from Abbot Ridge

== See also ==
- Geography of British Columbia
