= Gerlach Flicke =

German painter

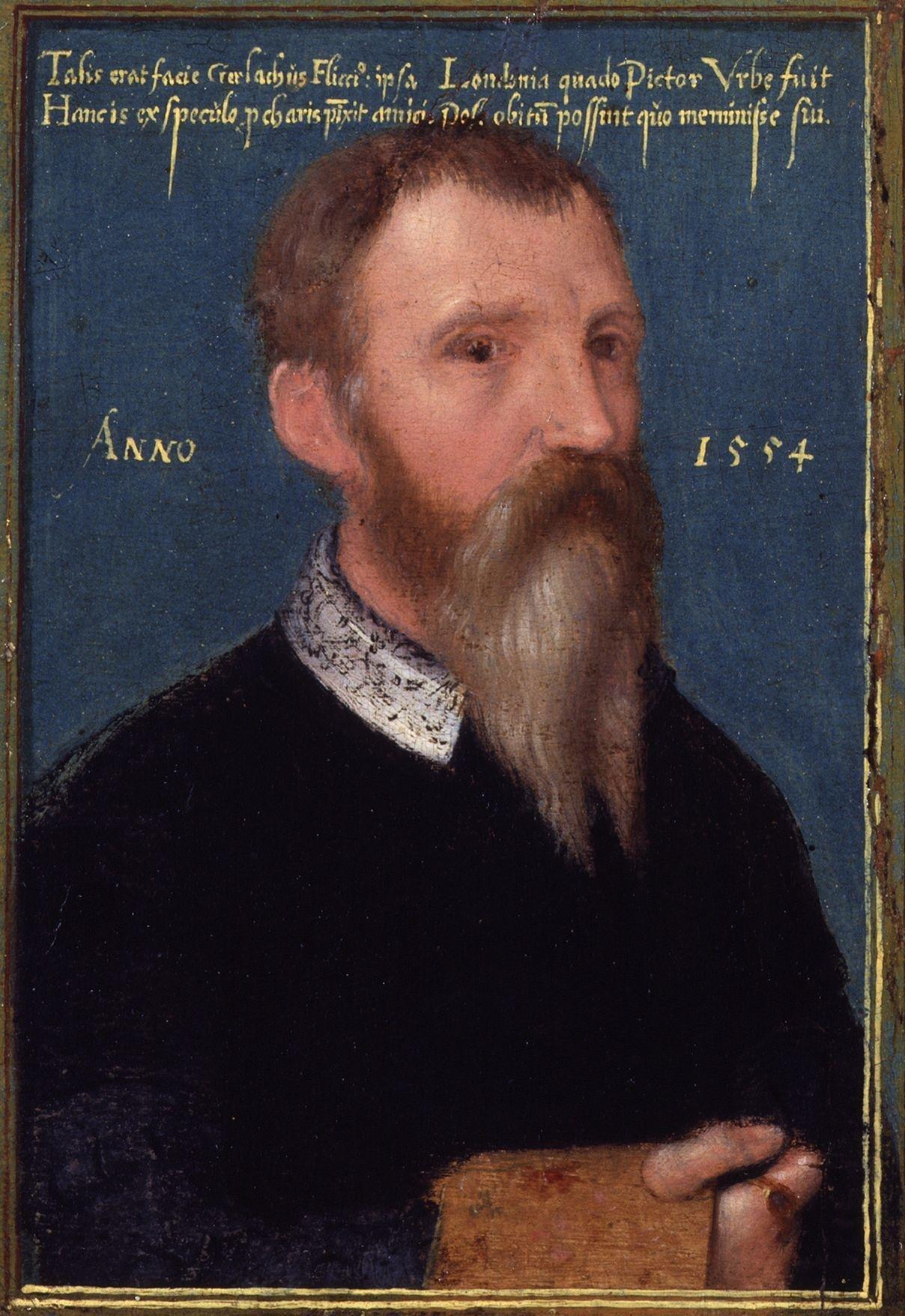
- Self-portrait, 1554
- Born: Osnabrück
- Died: 1558; London, England
- Occupation: painter
- Spouse: Katherine

Gerlach Flicke (fl. 1545 – 1558), Latin name Gerbarus Fleccius, anglicised in the 16th century as "Garlicke", was a German portrait painter who is known for his work in London as an artist of the Tudor court. Flicke was imprisoned in London and he made a portrait miniature whilst there. This painting is the earliest self-portrait in oils made in England.

== Biography ==
Flicke was born in the German town of Osnabrück, but is first recorded as a portrait painter in England. He arrived in London in about 1545 where he presented himself as an heir to Hans Holbein, who had died in 1543. Flicke was signing his works with a Latinised name and adding Germanus to emphasise his German training. Flicke limned portraits of Mary I.

One of Flicke's finest paintings, made around 1551, was probably a full-length portrait of Lord Darcy, with the legend Portrait of Thomas, First Lord Darcy of Chiche. That painting was last seen in 1848 at Irnham Hall, Lincolnshire, and has not been seen since.

In 1554 he was imprisoned in London, where he became a friend of the privateer Henry Strangwish. Why Flicke was imprisoned is not known but Strangwish was there because of his piracy. Flicke may have been a victim of the persecution of Protestants by Mary I of England from 1553.

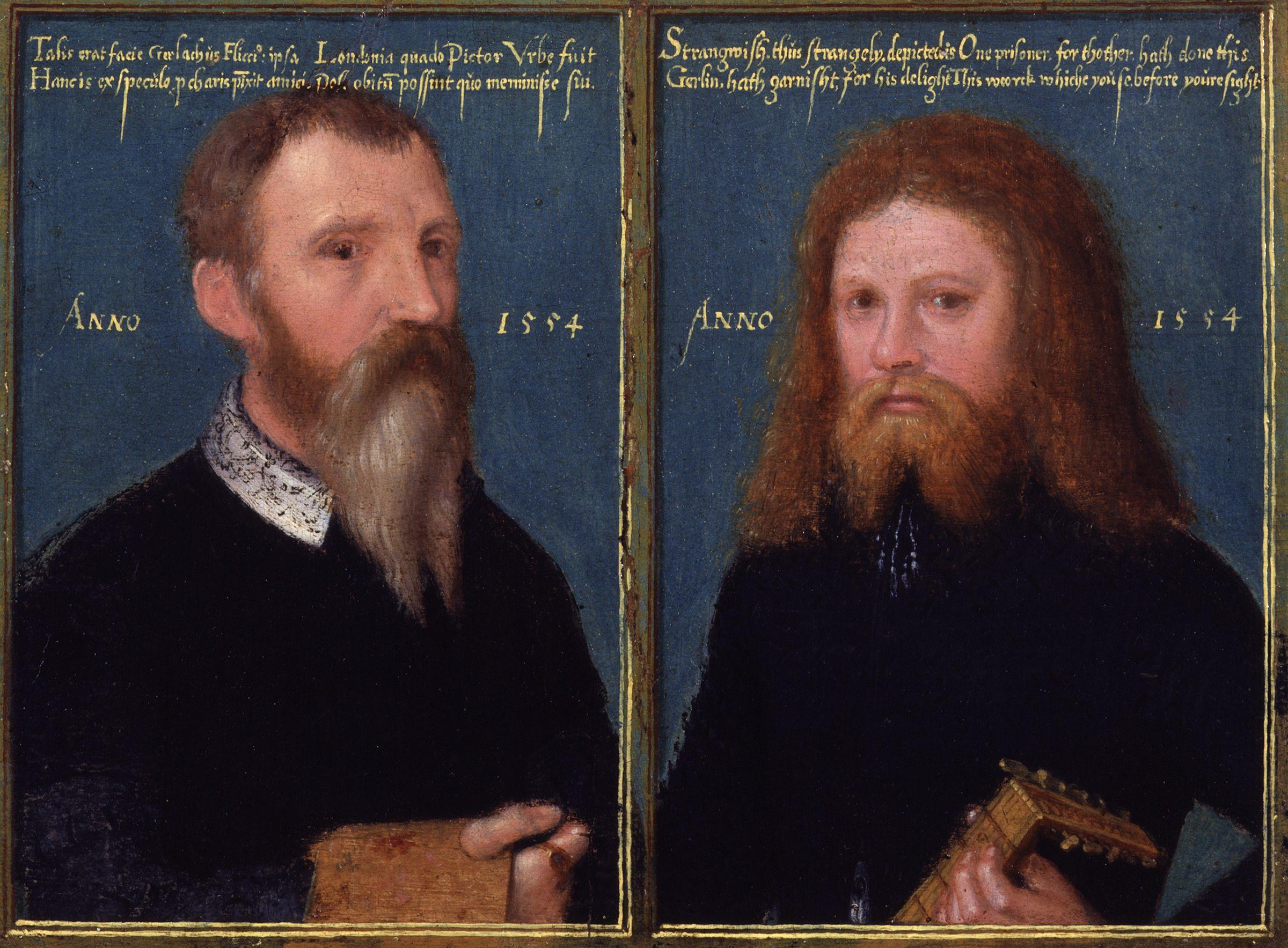
Flicke and Strangwish

The double portrait of Strangwish and Flicke is remarkable for a number of reasons. The portraits are both miniatures, less than four inches high. The self-portrait of Flicke, the earliest known self-portrait in oils painted in England, has a Latin inscription that may be translated, Such was the face of Gerlach Flicke when he was a painter in the City of London. This, he himself painted from a looking glass for his dear friends. So that they might have something to remember him after his death.

Flicke's best-known painting is possibly that of Thomas Cranmer, dated 1545, which is now in the National Portrait Gallery in London.

Flicke died in the London parish of St Giles-without-Cripplegate on 24 January 1558. He left his goods to a servant in Osnabrück, which suggests that was his home town.

== See also ==
- List of German painters
