= Henry Fox (sportsman) =

English cricketer for Somerset

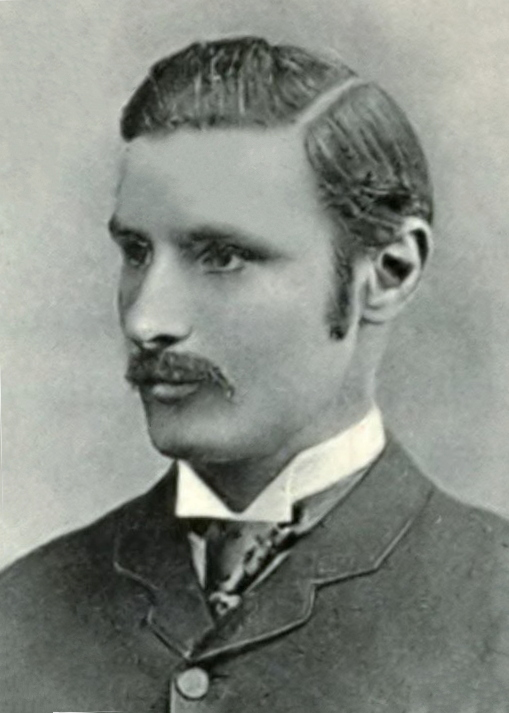

Personal information
- Full name: Henry Fox
- Born: 30 September 1856. Tonedale, Wellington, Somerset
- Died: on or after 30 August 1888 (aged 31); Caucasus Mountains, Russian Empire

Domestic team information
- Years: Team
- 1877–1882: Somerset
- FC debut: 8 June 1882 Somerset v Lancashire
- Last FC: 4 August 1882 Somerset v MCC

Career statistics
Competition	First-class
Matches	3
Runs scored	16
Batting average	2.66
100s/50s	0/0
Top score	6
Catches/stumpings	0/0
- Source: , 8 October 2015

Henry Fox (30 September 1856 – on or after 30 August 1888) was an English businessman, sportsman, and adventurer. He played cricket and rugby for his county, and began climbing mountains in the mid-1880s. He was part of the Fox family of Wellington, Somerset, and was a partner in the family business, Fox Brothers, a prominent textile manufacturer.

Fox played and financed cricket and rugby in Somerset; he played cricket for Somerset County Cricket Club from 1877 to 1882, and remained as a vice-president of the club until his death. He founded Wellington Rugby Football Club in 1874, and was an administrator and captain of the Somerset Rugby Football Union. After retiring as a rugby player, he continued to take part as an umpire. In 1884 he started mountaineering, and within two years he was well known in the mountain climbing community, and a well-regarded alpine explorer. In 1888, he and William Frederick Donkin travelled to the Caucasus Mountains in the Russian Empire in a bid to be the first ones to climb Koshtan-Tau. The pair, along with their Swiss guides, died in an accident during the expedition.

== Early life and sporting exploits ==
Henry Fox was born on 30 September 1856 as the second son of Dillworth Crewdson and Mary Augusta. He was educated at Sherborne School. His family owned Fox Brothers, of which he became a partner. In 1874, he founded Wellington Rugby Football Club. Three years later, he became the honorary secretary, treasurer and captain of the Somerset county rugby football team upon its formation. He was captain in both 1877 and 1878, playing as a three-quarter back, and remained secretary and treasurer until 1882. After retiring from the game, he continued as an umpire. Fox appeared in his final match in 1887, officiating the game between Somerset and Yorkshire.

As well as rugby, Fox also played cricket for his county, first appearing for Somerset County Cricket Club in 1877 during a match against Wiltshire. He tended to play as a lower-order batsmen for the county. His highest score in county cricket was 42 runs, made against Kent in 1881, prior to Somerset's elevation to first-class status. In June 1882, he was part of the Somerset team that competed in first-class cricket for the first time, losing by an innings and 157 runs to Lancashire; Fox scored no runs in either innings, and did not bowl. He made two further first-class appearances that season, and did not appear for Somerset again, due to business engagements. In all, he scored sixteen runs in first-class matches for Somerset at an average of 2.66. After retiring as a player, Fox continued to provide financial support to the cricket club, and remained a vice-president until his death.

Fox was also a keen mountaineer; having started mountain climbing in 1884, he joined the Alpine Club the following year. He received training initially from William Woodman Graham and then William Cecil Slingsby. According to an article in The Times, he was well regarded by his peers as "a climber of great skill and daring". He was a very experienced alpine climber, and often climbed without guides, ascending Aiguille du Dru, Fletschhorn, Ober Gabelhorn amongst others in this fashion. With guides, he climbed some of the toughest mountains in the Alps, such as the Matterhorn and the Eiger.

== Death in the Caucasus Mountains ==
Fox left Wellington in late July 1888 for the Caucasus Mountains in the Russian Empire, joining up with William Frederick Donkin and Clinton Dent. The three were aiming to become the first climbers to scale Koshtan-Tau, (Note: Some sources state that they were climbing Dykh-Tau, another mountain in the Caucasus; Douglas Freshfield explains this variation as being due to the names of the mountains being reversed; what is now known as Koshtan-Tau used to be Dykh-Tau, and vice versa.) one of the few mountains in the region yet to be scaled. The three started from Nalchik, though Dent was forced to return home due to ill-health, leaving Fox and Donkin to attempt the climb, along with two Swiss guides. Their initial plan was to climb a glacier on the northern slopes of the mountain, and then make their final ascent on the western side. However, a rock wall on the western slopes prevented this, and they changed their plans to attack the mountain from the east. They planned to meet up with their outfitter to the south-east of the mountain, but after they missed that meeting, a message was sent back to Dent reporting the climbers missing. The Times reported on 6 October that Donkin and Fox, along with their guides, had suffered a mountaineering accident that had led "to the almost certain loss of four lives".

Multiple searches were carried out, including one on the direct order of Tsar Alexander III, but no evidence was found. The Russians did recover items from the climbers' base camp, including Fox's diary. Russian authorities, possibly for political reasons, claimed that the climbing party may have probably strayed into Svaneti, Georgia, and may have been murdered by the local population, who had rebelled against the Russians not long before. In 1889, Dent and Douglas Freshfield led an expedition to search the area. Although they were unable to find any remains, they did discover a bivouac at around 14,000 feet (4,300 m) on the Ullu-auz pass between two glaciers. They recovered a number of personal items from the camp, but found that light climbing gear – rope, ice axes and a camera – were missing. The search party concluded that Donkin and Fox had continued their climb, intending to return to the bivouac, but had fallen while navigating a narrow ridge higher up the mountain. Such a fall would have been thousands of feet, and the winter snow would have covered the climbers' bodies. So despite conducting a search of the valley floor, no bodies were recovered.

For the purposes of his will, Fox's death was recorded as being "on or since the 30th August, 1888, at some place unknown." The value of his personal estate was just over £7,639. As he was not married and had no children, his estate was shared between his eldest brother, Charles Dillworth, and his four sisters, Sarah, Anna, Alice and Louisa. A cricket pavilion was erected in his memory at Wellington Cricket Club in Somerset, and a mountain in the Dawson Range in Canada was named Mount Fox in his honour.
