= Henry Strangways (pirate) =

16th-century English pirate

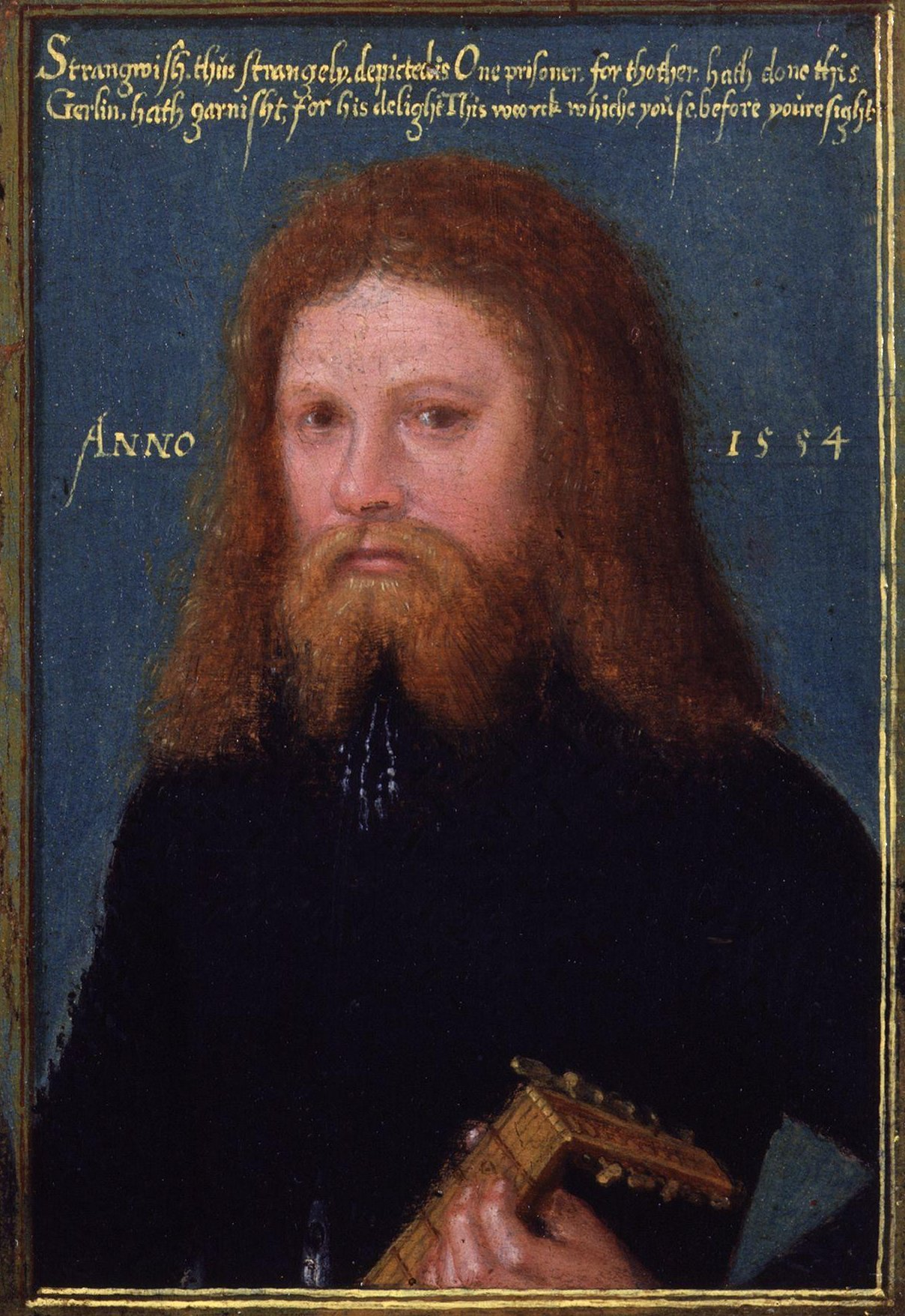
- Strangwish 1554 by Flicke
- Born: circa 1500; Dorset
- Died: 1562; Rouen
- Piratical career
- Nickname: Henry Strangwish
- Type: Pirate

Henry Strangways (died 1562), also sometimes known as Strangwish, was an English "Gentleman Pirate" who attacked Spanish and other shipping. He was repeatedly imprisoned, and pardoned by highly placed friends, during his approximately eight-year piratical career, from about 1552 to 1560. His portrait painted by a fellow prisoner, Gerlach Flicke, resides today in the National Portrait Gallery in London.

== Biography ==
Strangways was born in Dorset to a well-known family of good standing.

Strangwish is the nephew of Richard Manners, husband of Margaret Dymoke. Richard is the brother of Margaret Manners, both are children of George Manners, '11th Baron de Ros', of Helmsley and Anne St Leger, daughter of Anne of York, Duchess of Exeter, the daughter of Richard Plantagenet, 3rd Duke of York and Cecily Neville.

Margaret is mother of Strangwish, his father is Sir Henry Strangewish, thus he is sometimes referred to as a "Gentleman Pirate".

Strangways began his career as a pirate in 1552–53, plying the Irish Sea for plunder. There he joined forces with the Cornish Killigrews, successful pirates themselves, using Portland Castle as a den to store loot. His achievements were such that two men-of-war were prepared at Portsmouth to apprehend Strangways. He next appears in the historical record in 1555 imprisoned in the Tower of London. However nothing came of it and it is probable he had highly placed friends helping him out. In 1559 he was condemned to death after being arrested with eighty of his men, but he managed to avoid the sentence just before execution.

That same year in 1559 he was recorded as wanting to "steal an island" from Philip II of Spain. However, piracy seems to have taken precedence, he attacked not a Spanish island but Spanish ships. This is known to us because of an official complaint and request for damages which was made out to Philip II of Spain in which a ship, belonging to Johannes de Bagnes, was plundered by Enrriex Tranquaz (i.e. Strangways). The demand was made via Basilio Pignatelli, the Bishop of L'Aquila in 1559. Strangway's imprisonment in December 1560 is probably related to his Spanish piracy; but he was released, this time under a promise of good conduct, further suggesting he had powerful friends and/or served a political state purpose behind his activities.

Strangways died a free man in 1562, after the intervention of well placed friends that secured a pardon from Queen Elizabeth I. The Royal Pardon after his death, the many releases from jail, and the seemingly complicit co-operation by authorities (the use of Portland Castle as a pirate den for instance), has suggested to later historians that Strangways' reputation is as much a "privateer" as pirate.

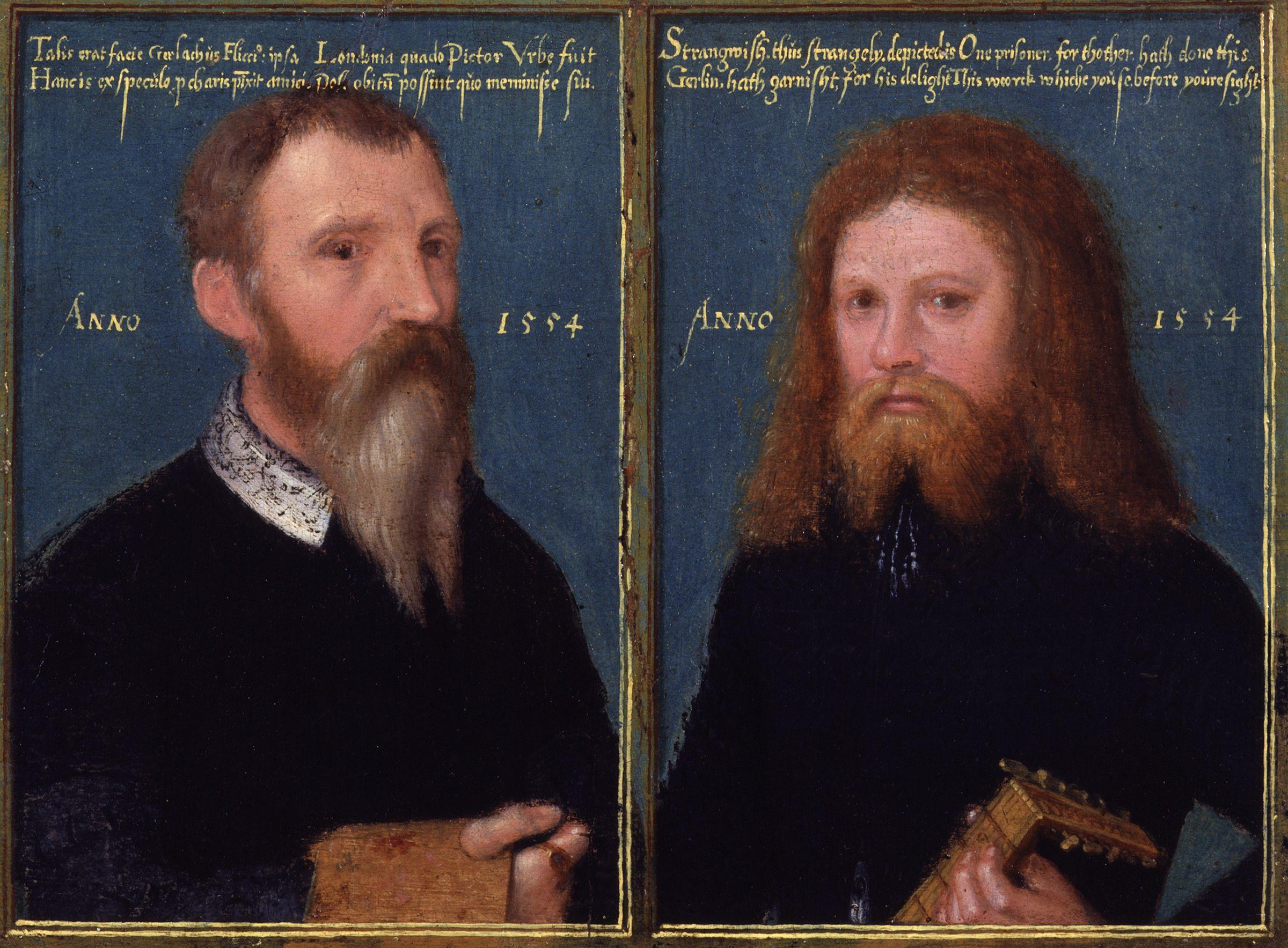
Flicke and Strangwish

== Portrait ==
During one of Strangways' imprisonments in 1554 he became friends with fellow prisoner Gerlach Flicke. Flicke, who had been working as a portrait painter in England for about ten years (although born in the German town of Osnabrück), painted a double portrait of Strangways and Flicke while in prison. Why Flicke was imprisoned is not known but Strangways was known to have been imprisoned for his piracy.

The double portrait of Strangways, with lute in hand, and Flicke, carrying his artist's palette, is in the National Portrait Gallery in London. The portraits are both miniatures, being less than 4 inches (100 mm) high. The self-portrait has a Latin inscription that may be translated, Such was the face of Gerlach Flicke when he was a painter in the City of London. This, he himself painted from a looking glass for his dear friends. So that they might have something to remember him after his death. Although the two portraits are on the same piece of material, Flicke's inscription is in Latin, whilst Strangways' is in English and reads, Strangwish, thus strangely depicted is One prisoner, for thother, hath done this/ Gerlin, hath garnisht, for his delight This woorck whiche you se, before youre sight.
