= Mount Fox (Selkirk Mountains) =

Mountain in British Columbia, Canada

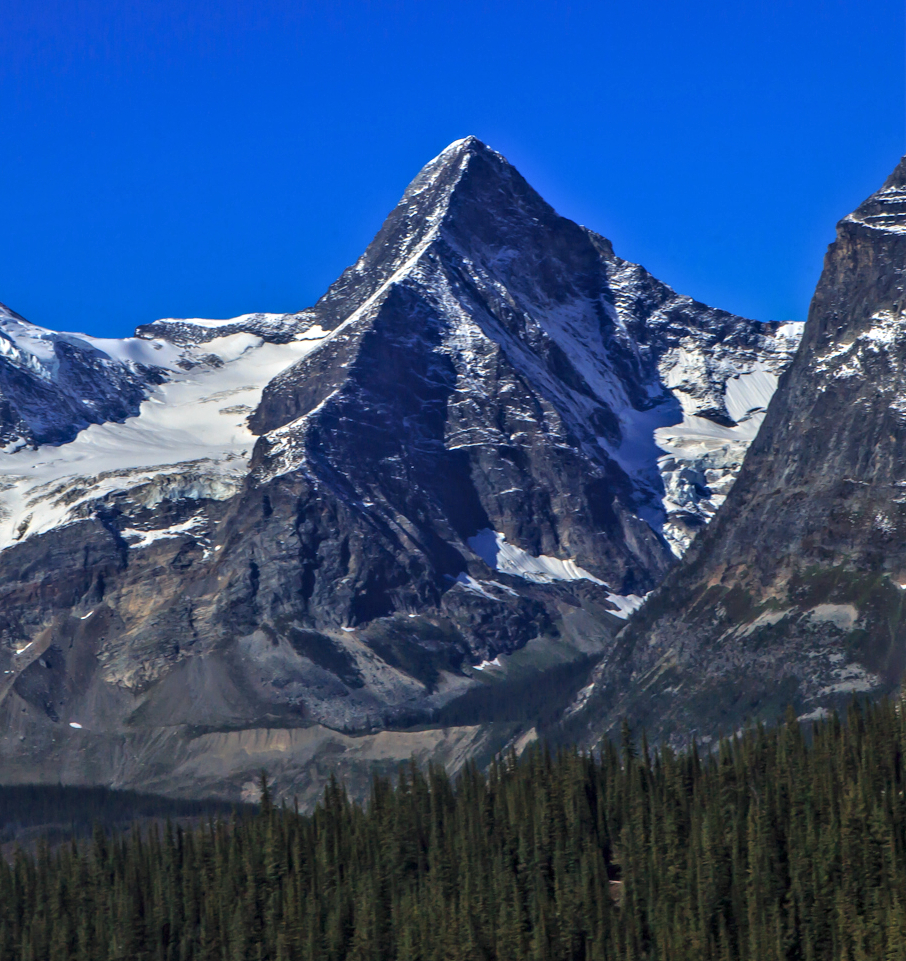
- Mt. Fox, east aspect

Highest point
- Elevation: 3,196 m (10,486 ft)
- Prominence: 411 m (1,348 ft)
- Parent peak: Mount Dawson
- Listing: Mountains of British Columbia
- Coordinates: 51°10′08″N 117°25′17″W

Geography
- Location within British Columbia Location within Canada
- Country: Canada
- Province: British Columbia
- District: Kootenay Land District
- Protected area: Glacier National Park
- Parent range: Selkirk Mountains
- Topo map: NTS 82N3 Mount Wheeler

Climbing
- First ascent: 1890 by Harold W. Topham, Harry Sinclair, Samuel Yves

Mount Fox in the Selkirk Mountains of Canada was named, by William Green, in honour of Harry Fox who perished with William Donkin and two Swiss guides, in the Caucasus Mountains. Mount Donkin is nearby.

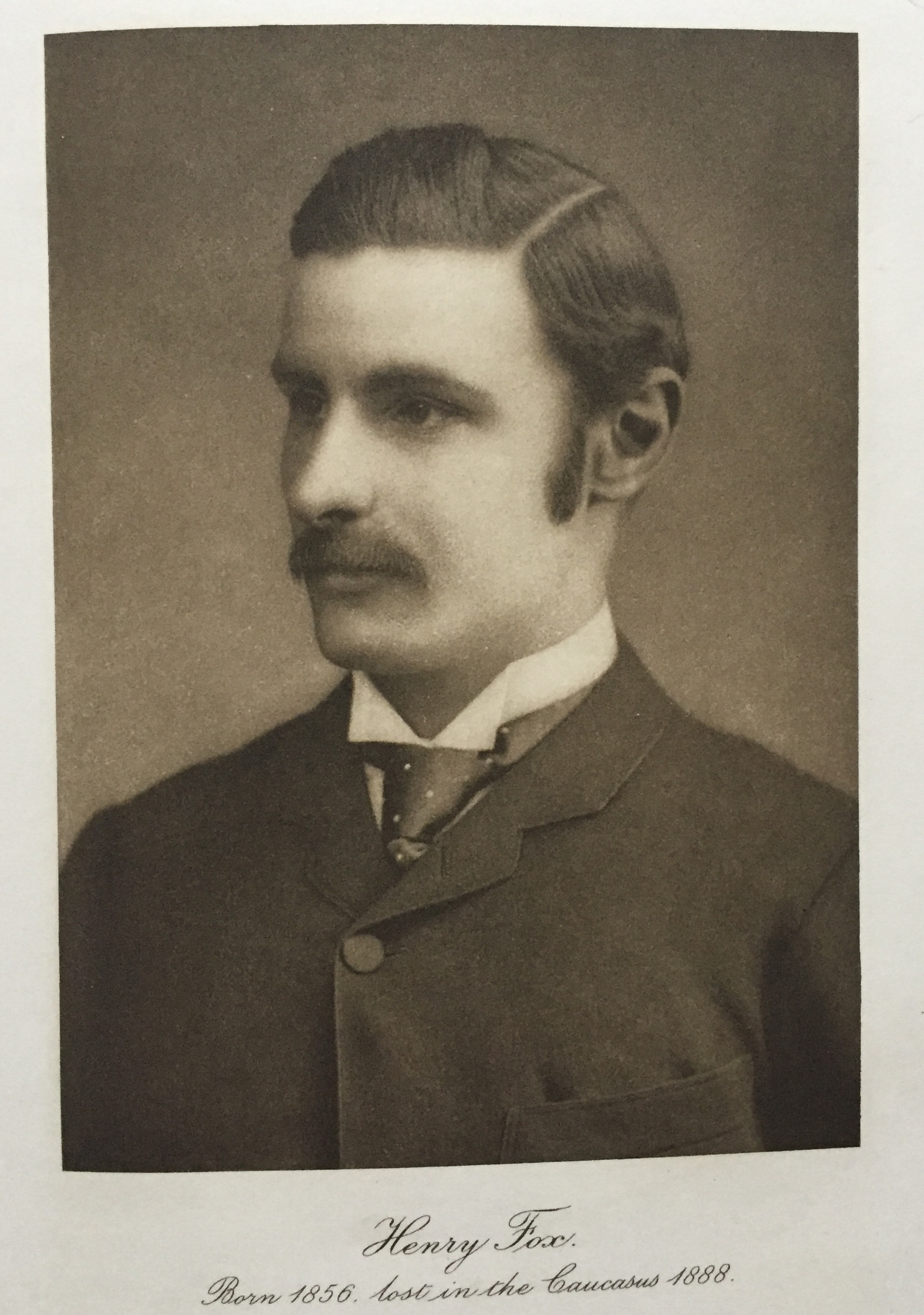
Henry "Harry" Fox

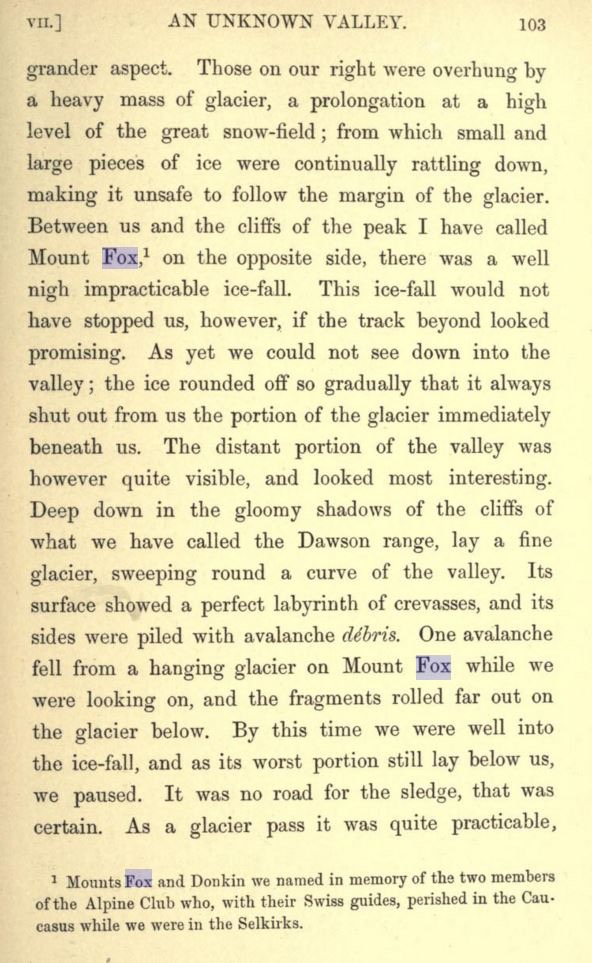
Among The Selkirk Glaciers

Harry Fox (30 September 1856 – on or after 30 August 1888) was an English gentleman (also lived at Tone Dale House, Wellington, Somerset, England) who was a sportsman and adventurer. He played cricket and rugby for his country, and began climbing mountains in the mid-1880s.

In 1884 he started mountaineering, and within two years he was well known in the mountain climbing community, and a well-regarded alpine explorer. In 1888, he travelled with William Frederick Donkin to the Caucasus Mountains in the Russian Empire in a bid to be the first people to climb Koshtan-Tau, but the pair, along with their Swiss guides, died in an accident.

For the purposes of his will, Fox's death was recorded as being "on or since the 30th August, 1888, at some place unknown."

== Climate ==
Based on the Köppen climate classification, Mount Fox is located in a subarctic climate zone with cold, snowy winters, and mild summers. Winter temperatures can drop below −20 °C with wind chill factors below −30 °C. Precipitation runoff from the mountain drains west into the Incomappleux River, or east into the Beaver River.

== See also ==
- Geography of British Columbia
