= Touch judge =

A touch judge is an official who monitors the touch-line in a rugby union or rugby league game and raises a flag if the ball (or player carrying it) goes into touch. Touch judges also stand behind the posts to confirm that a goal has been scored following a penalty kick or conversion of a try. There are two touch judges, one for each touch-line and each holding a different coloured flag.

== Rugby union ==
Rugby union touch judges support the referee by marking 'touch' (identifying when the ball leaves the playing area and comes into contact with something there or when the player carrying the ball steps out of the playing area), indicating successful kicks at goal, and marking offside lines at set piece plays (the scrum and line out).

Depending on the relevant national regulations, touch judges can be recognised as 'assistant referees' and have the authority to indicate foul play, support with pre-match protocols, and other roles delegated to them by the referee.

In England, touch judges are only recognised as assistant referees when appointed by the RFU or by the relevant Referees' Society. Touch judges in most community matches do not act as assistant referees and cannot comment on foul play or other technical matters.

In test matches, it is normal for the referee and assistant referees to be connected by a radio link to aid the communication of all this information.

At elite levels of the 'sevens' variation of rugby union, additional in-goal assistant referees exist to support the referee with in-goal decisions.

== Rugby league ==
In rugby league, touch judges can communicate with the referee verbally or through several specific flag and hand signals. These indicate specific breaches of the laws, such as forward pass, knock on and penalty offences, how play should restart and whether the ball was grounded correctly for a try. As in rugby union, touch judges stand behind the posts to confirm the success of a penalty kick or the conversion of a try. Touch judge and referee signals and duties in rugby league are laid out in the game's laws. In some matches, additional officials are used solely to determine whether a try has been correctly grounded. These are known as "in-goal" officials.

== See also ==
- Referee
- Touch (rugby)
