= Dawson Range (British Columbia) =

Mountain range in British Columbia, Canada

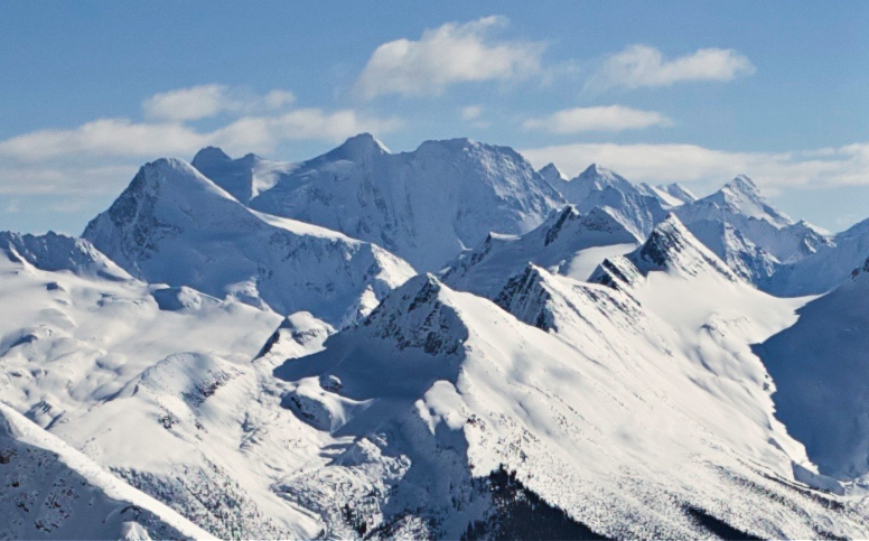
- Mount Dawson massif

Highest point
- Peak: Mount Dawson
- Elevation: 3,377 m (11,079 ft)
- Coordinates: 51°09′06″N 117°25′14″W

Dimensions
- Area: 34 km^{2} (13 mi^{2})

Geography
- Location within British Columbia
- Country: Canada
- Province: British Columbia
- Range coordinates: 51°09′N 117°26′W
- Parent range: Selkirk Mountains
- Topo map: NTS 82N3 Mount Wheeler

The Dawson Range is a subrange of the Selkirk Mountains of the Columbia Mountains in southeastern British Columbia, Canada, located southeast of Rogers Pass in Glacier National Park. The highest point is Mount Dawson. Other peaks of the range include Mount Selwyn, Mount Donkin, and Mount Fox. The range is named for George Dawson, explorer and surveyor of British Columbia.
