= Koshtan-Tau =

Mountain in Kabardino-Balkaria, Russia

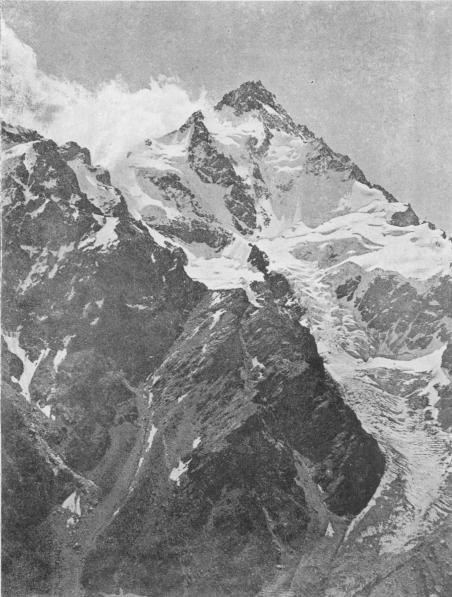

Highest point
- Elevation: 5,144 m (16,877 ft)
- Prominence: 812 m (2,664 ft)
- Isolation: 6.55 km (4.07 mi)
- Coordinates: 43°03′00″N 43°13′00″E

Geography
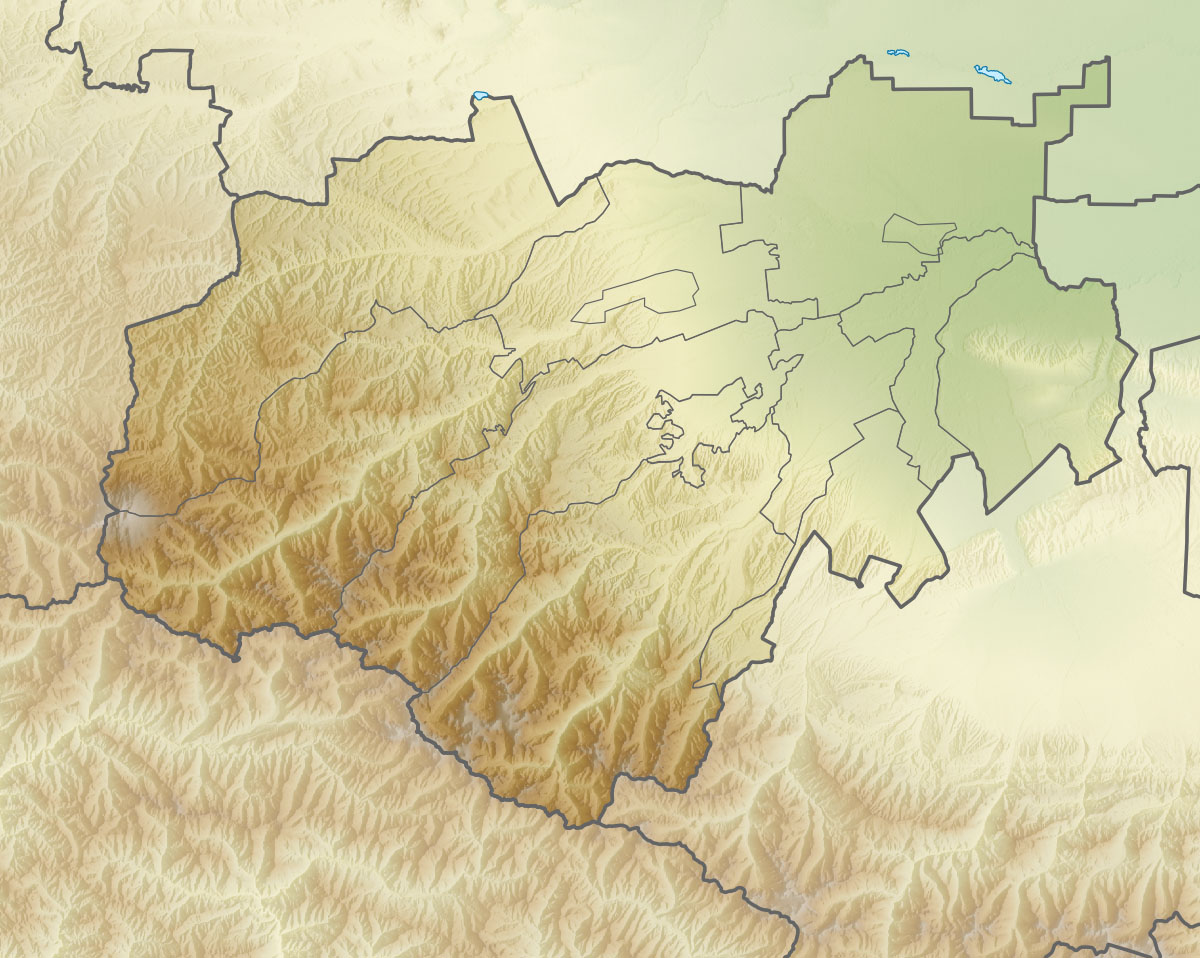
- Location within Caucasus Mountains Location within Kabardino-Balkaria
- Location: Kabardino-Balkaria, Russia
- Country: Kabardino-Balkaria
- Parent range: Caucasus Mountains

Climbing
- First ascent: 1889

Koshtan-Tau (Russian: Коштан-тау; Karachay-Balkar: Къоштан тау, romanized: Qoştan taw, lit. 'paired mountain') is the highest peak (5,144m) of the Koshtan massif of the central Caucasus Mountains in the Kabardino-Balkaria Republic of Russia, near the border with Georgia. The peak was first ascended in 1889 by Herman Woolley and party.
