= Ursus Minor Mountain =

Mountain in British Columbia, Canada

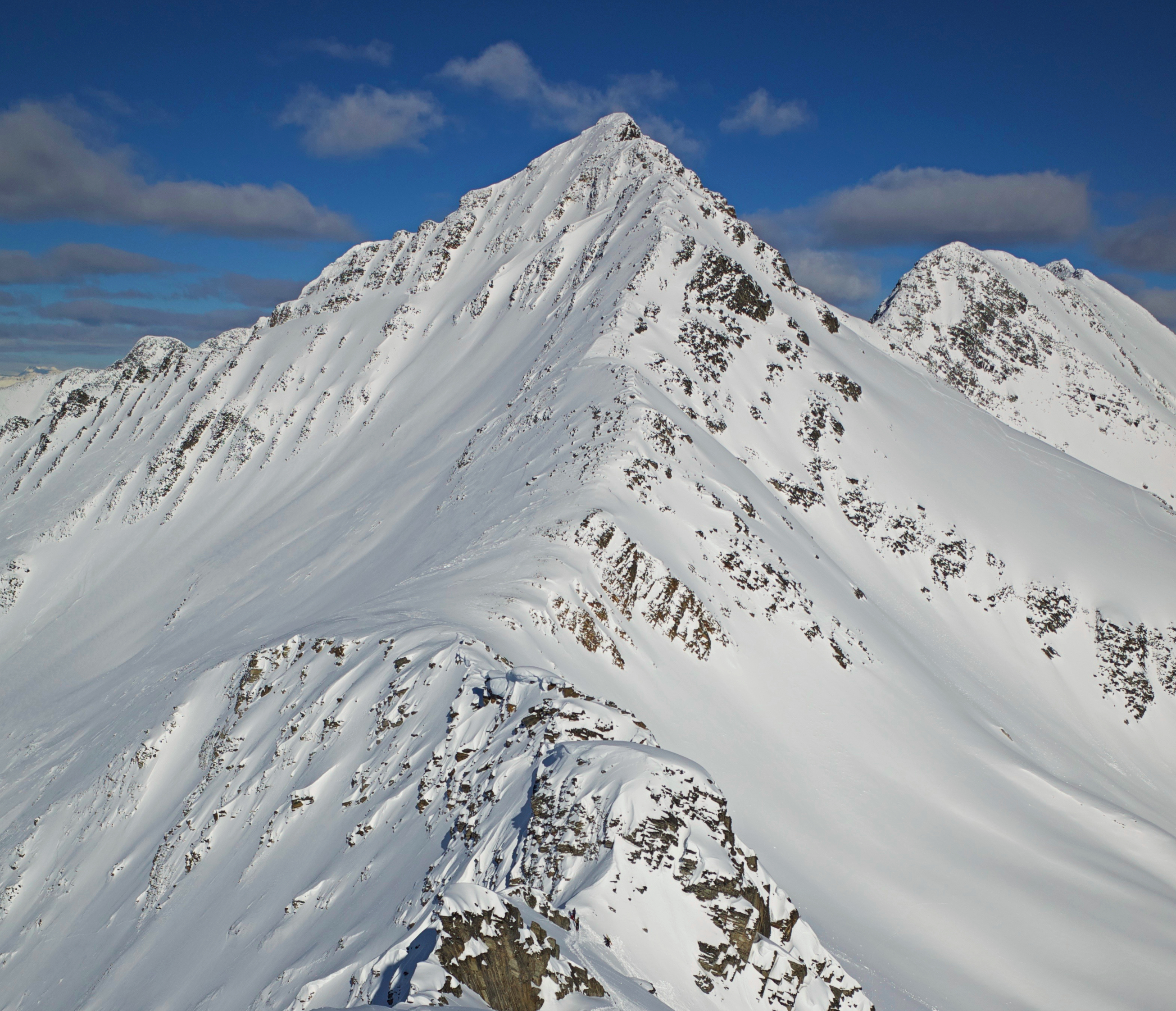
- Ursus Minor Mountain, southwest aspect

Highest point
- Elevation: 2,749 m (9,019 ft)
- Prominence: 230 m (750 ft)
- Parent peak: Mount Sifton (2922 m)
- Listing: Mountains of British Columbia
- Coordinates: 51°18′38″N 117°34′37″W

Geography
- Location within British Columbia Location within Canada
- Interactive map of Ursus Minor Mountain
- Country: Canada
- Province: British Columbia
- District: Kootenay Land District
- Protected area: Glacier National Park
- Parent range: Hermit Range; Selkirk Mountains
- Topo map: NTS 82N5 Glacier

Climbing
- First ascent: 1907, Rupert W. Haggen, Edouard Feuz Jr.
- Easiest route: class 3 Scramble

Ursus Minor Mountain is a 2,749-metre (9,019-foot) mountain summit located in Glacier National Park, in the Hermit Range of the Selkirk Mountains in British Columbia, Canada. Ursus Minor Mountain is situated 56 km (35 mi) northeast of Revelstoke, and 44 km (27 mi) west of Golden. It is also set 3.5 km (2.2 mi) northwest of Cheops Mountain, and 4 km (2.5 mi) west of Rogers Pass. Its nearest higher peak is Grizzly Mountain, 1.27 km (0.79 mi) to the east-northeast. The first ascent of the mountain was made in 1907 by Rupert W. Haggen, with guide Edouard Feuz Jr. The mountain's name was adopted in 1906, then re-approved September 8, 1932, by the Geographical Names Board of Canada. It was so-named because of its proximity above Bear Creek (since renamed Connaught Creek), and in keeping with the bear theme of other nearby features such as Ursus Major Mountain, Grizzly Mountain, Bruins Pass, and Balu Pass.

== Climate ==
Based on the Köppen climate classification, Ursus Minor Mountain is located in a subarctic climate zone with cold, snowy winters, and mild summers. Temperatures can drop below −20 °C with wind chill factors below −30 °C. Precipitation runoff from the mountain and meltwater from a small unnamed glacier on its north slope drains into tributaries of the Illecillewaet River and Beaver River.

== Gallery ==
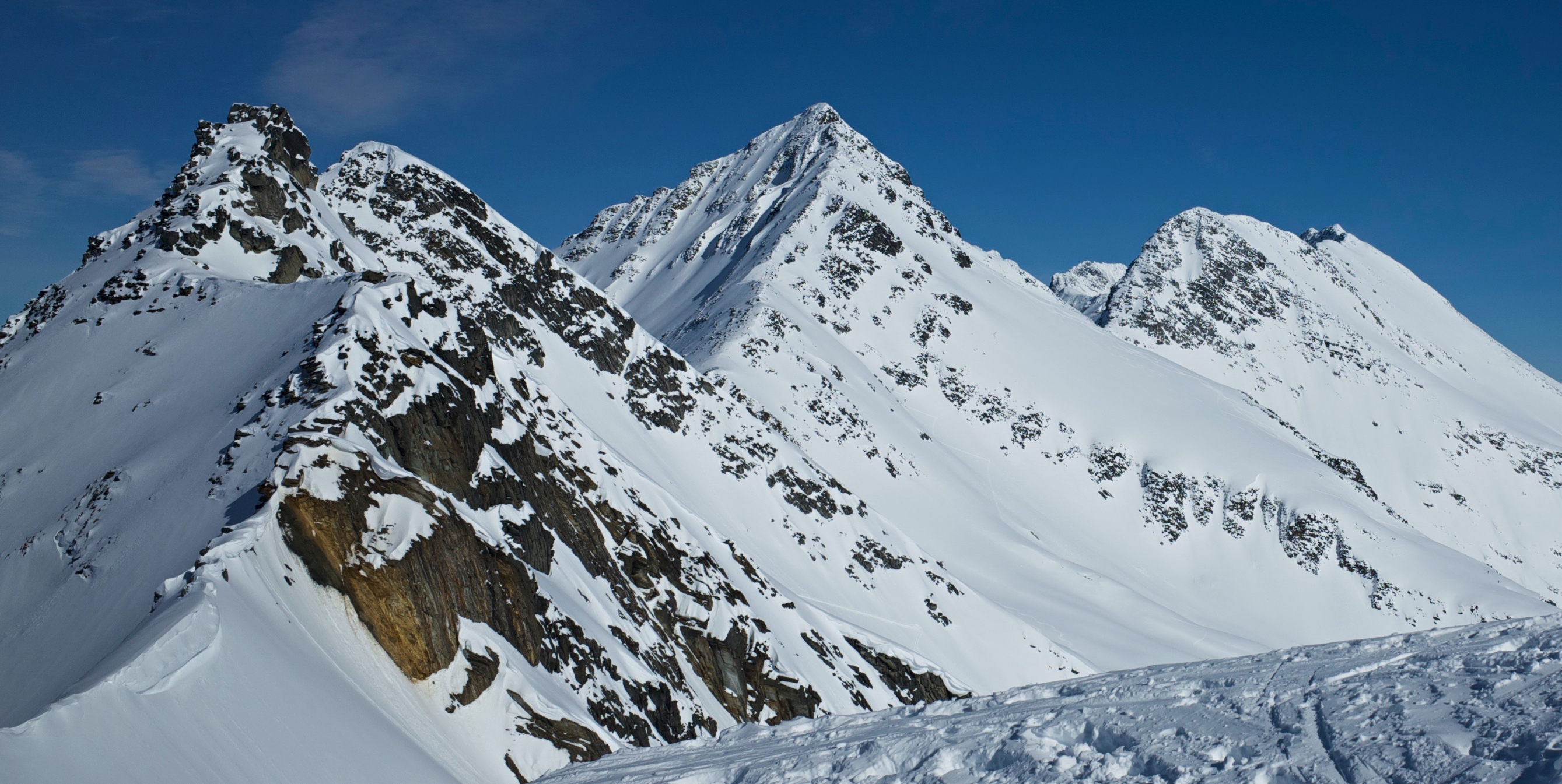
Ursus Minor centered, with Grizzly Mountain to right

== See also ==
- Geography of British Columbia
- Geology of British Columbia
