= Grizzly Mountain (Canada) =

Mountain in British Columbia, Canada

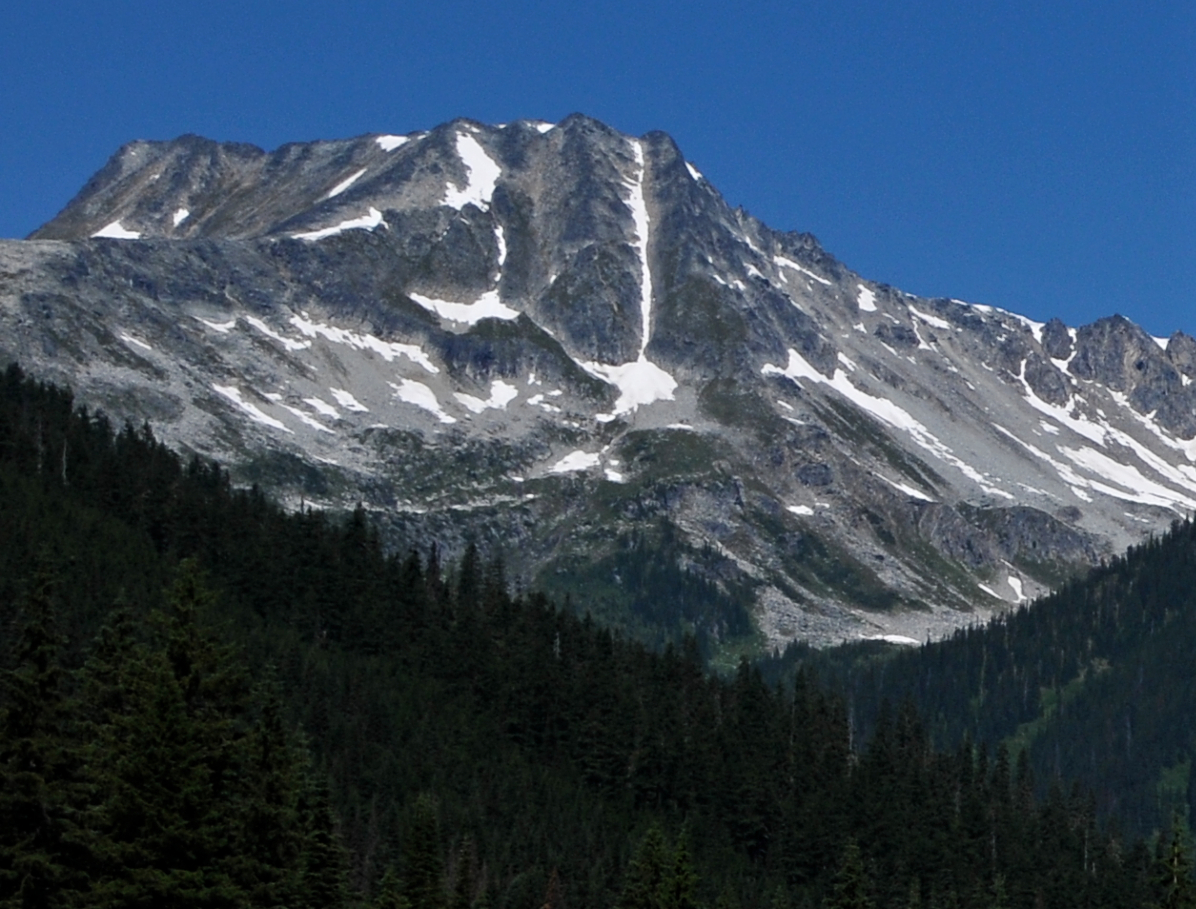
- Grizzly Mountain, southeast aspect, as seen from Rogers Pass

Highest point
- Elevation: 2,754 m (9,035 ft)
- Prominence: 182 m (597 ft)
- Parent peak: Mount Sifton (2922 m)
- Listing: Mountains of British Columbia
- Coordinates: 51°18′58″N 117°33′40″W

Geography
- Location within British Columbia Location within Canada
- Interactive map of Grizzly Mountain
- Location: Glacier National Park; British Columbia, Canada
- District: Kootenay Land District
- Parent range: Hermit Range; Selkirk Mountains
- Topo map: NTS 82N5 Glacier

Climbing
- First ascent: 1901
- Easiest route: class 3 Scrambling North Ridge

Grizzly Mountain is a 2,754-metre (9,035-foot) mountain summit located in Glacier National Park, in the Hermit Range of the Selkirk Mountains in British Columbia, Canada. Grizzly Mountain is situated 57 km (35 mi) northeast of Revelstoke, and 42 km (26 mi) west of Golden. It is also set 4 km (2.5 mi) north of Cheops Mountain, and 3 km (1.9 mi) west of Rogers Pass from which it can be seen from the Trans-Canada Highway. The closest peak to Grizzly is Ursus Minor Mountain, 1.27 km (0.79 mi) to the west-southwest, and its nearest higher peak is Mount Sifton, 2.35 km (1.46 mi) to the north. The first ascent of the mountain was made August 31, 1901, by John E. Bushnell, August S. Eggers, Karl Schuluneggar, and Friedrich Michel via the southeast couloir. The first ascent of the north ridge was made in 1921 by Neal Carter, Tom Fyles, and Don Munday. The class 5.2 west ridge was first climbed by Georgia Engelhard and Ernest Feuz in 1933. The mountain's name was adopted in 1906, then re-approved September 8, 1932, by the Geographical Names Board of Canada. It was so-named because of its proximity above Bear Creek (since renamed Connaught Creek), and in keeping with the bear theme of other nearby features such as Ursus Major Mountain, Ursus Minor Mountain, Bruins Pass, and Balu Pass.

== Climate ==
Based on the Köppen climate classification, Grizzly Mountain is located in a subarctic climate zone with cold, snowy winters, and mild summers. Temperatures can drop below −20 °C with wind chill factors below −30 °C. Precipitation runoff from the mountain and meltwater from a small unnamed glacier on its northwest slope drains into tributaries of the Beaver River and Illecillewaet River.

== Gallery ==
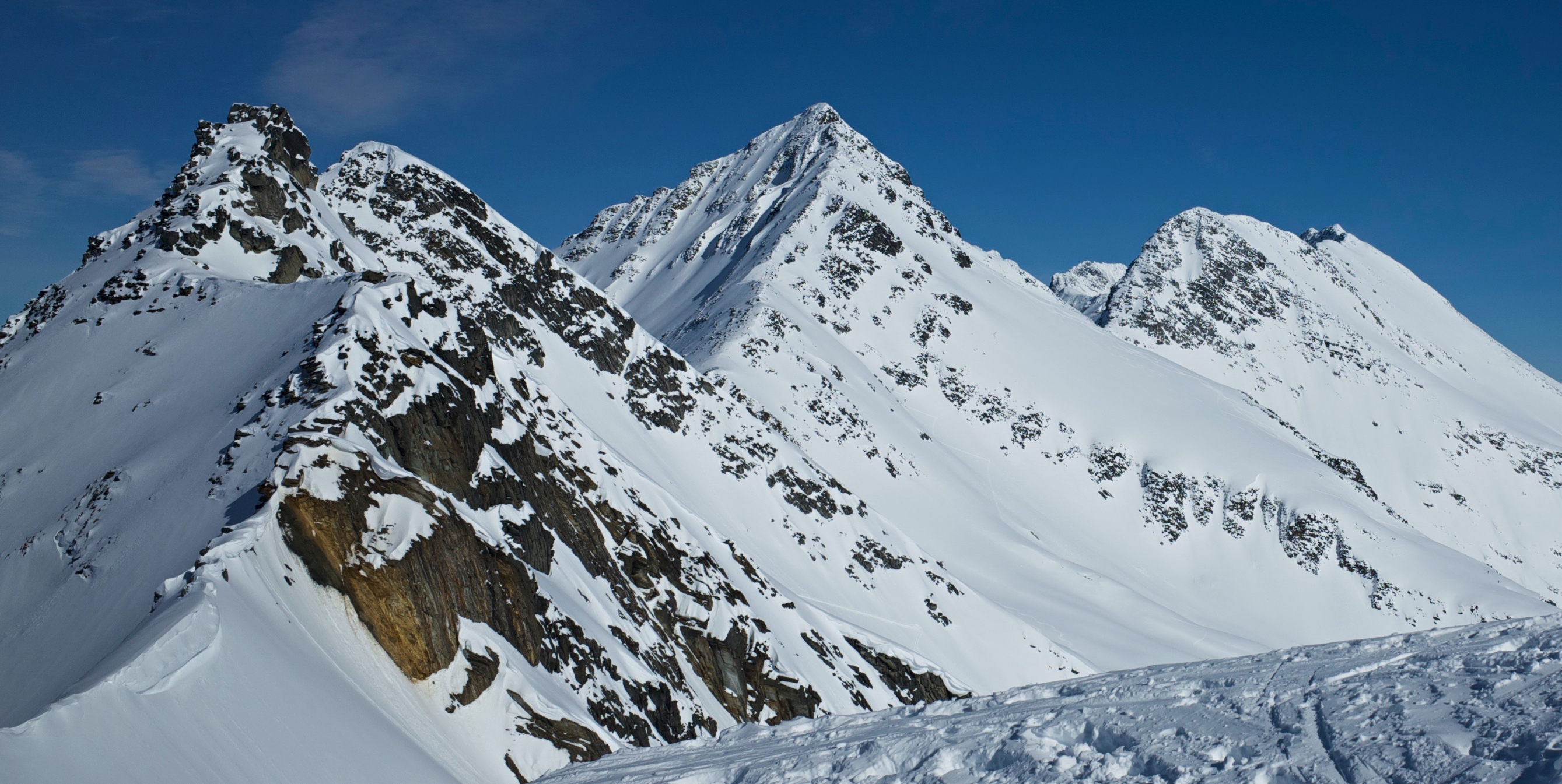
Ursus Minor Mountain centered, with Grizzly Mountain to right

== See also ==
- Geography of British Columbia
- Geology of British Columbia
