= Hermit Mountain =

Mountain in the country of Canada

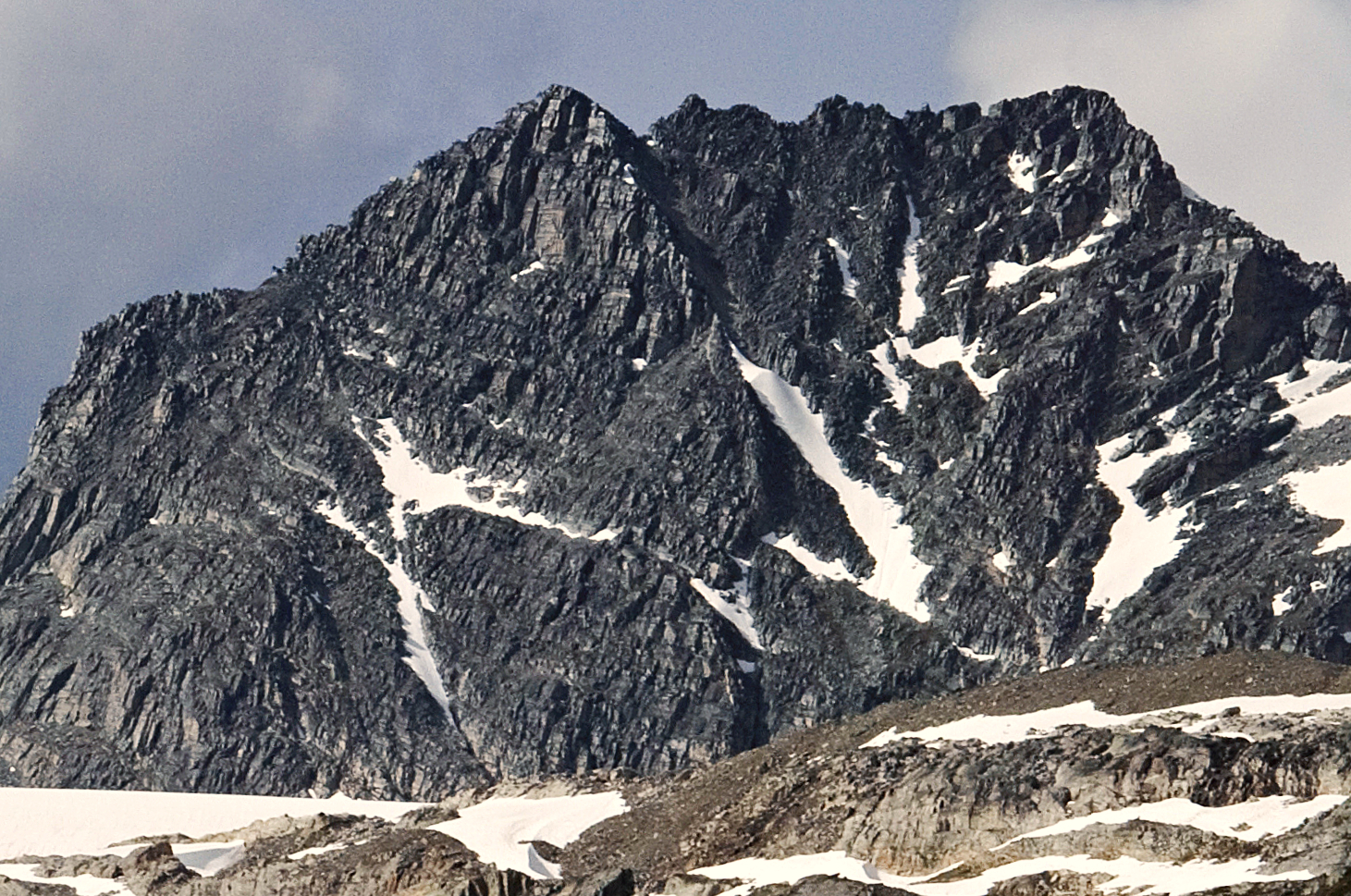
- Hermit Mountain, south aspect

Highest point
- Elevation: 3,050 m (10,010 ft)
- Prominence: 180 m (590 ft)
- Parent peak: Mount Rogers (3,169 m)
- Listing: Mountains of British Columbia
- Coordinates: 51°21′24″N 117°31′05″W

Geography
- Location within British Columbia Location within Canada
- Interactive map of Hermit Mountain
- Location: Glacier National Park; British Columbia, Canada
- Parent range: Hermit Range; Selkirk Mountains
- Topo map: NTS 82N5 Glacier

Climbing
- First ascent: 1904 Alex Gordon, Samuel Harper Gray, James Herdman, Edward Feuz, Edward Feuz Jr.
- Easiest route: Scrambling South Couloir

Hermit Mountain is a 3,050-metre (10,010-foot) mountain summit located in Glacier National Park, in the Hermit Range of the Selkirk Mountains in British Columbia, Canada. Hermit Mountain is situated 64 km (40 mi) northeast of Revelstoke, and 39 km (24 mi) west of Golden. It is also set 2.7 km (1.7 mi) north-northwest of Mount Tupper, and 6 km (3.7 mi) north of Rogers Pass, from which it can be seen from the Trans-Canada Highway. The nearest higher peak is Swiss Peak on Mount Rogers, 1 km (0.62 mi) to the west. The first ascent of the mountain was made August 4, 1904, by Alex M. Gordon, Samuel Harper Gray, James C. Herdman, Edward Feuz, and Edward Feuz Jr. via the Southeast Couloir. The mountain's name was adopted in 1904, then re-approved September 8, 1932, by the Geographical Names Board of Canada.

== Climate ==
Based on the Köppen climate classification, Hermit Mountain is located in a subarctic climate zone with cold, snowy winters, and mild summers. Winter temperatures can drop below −20 °C with wind chill factors below −30 °C. This climate supports the Tupper Glacier on the south slope, Hermit Glacier on the north aspect, and an unnamed glacier in the east cirque. Precipitation runoff from the mountain and meltwater from these surrounding glaciers on its slopes drains into tributaries of the Beaver River.

== Climbing Routes ==
Established climbing routes on Hermit Mountain:

- Southeast Couloir - class 4 First ascent 1904
- South Couloir - class 3 FA 1904
- West Ridge - class 5 FA 1920
- Rogers-Hermit Traverse - class 5 FA 1925
- Southeast Ridge - class 4 FA 1936

== Gallery ==
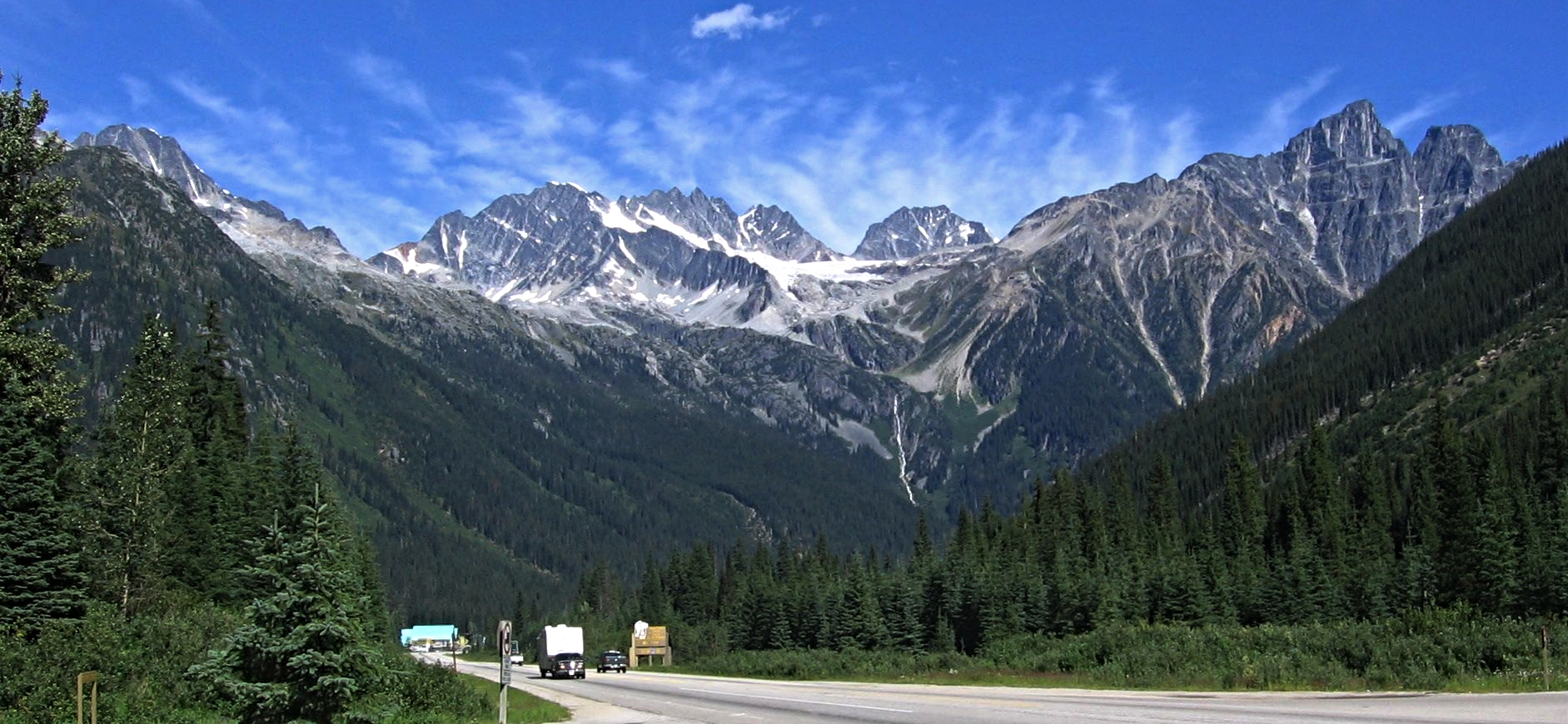
Rogers Pass L to R: Mount Sifton (partly covered), Mt. Rogers, Hermit Mountain, and Mt. Tupper

== See also ==
- Geography of British Columbia
- Geology of British Columbia
