= Catamount (disambiguation) =

Catamount, or cougar, is a large cat native to the Americas.

Catamount may also refer to:

== Places ==
- Catamount, Massachusetts, a former village in Massachusetts, US
- Catamount Peak, a mountain in British Columbia, Canada
- Catamount Ski Area, a ski resort in New York and Massachusetts, US
- Catamount Trail, a ski trail in Vermont, US

== Other uses ==
- Catamount (operating system), an operating system for supercomputers
- USS Catamount, a ship of the US Navy
- Catamount Records, a US record label
- Catamount Cup, an annual men's college ice hockey tournament in Vermont, US

== See also ==
- Vermont Catamounts, the varsity intercollegiate athletic programs of the University of Vermont, Vermont, US
- Western Carolina Catamounts, the varsity intercollegiate athletic programs of Western Carolina University, North Carolina, US
