= Catamount Peak =

Mountain peak in British Columbia

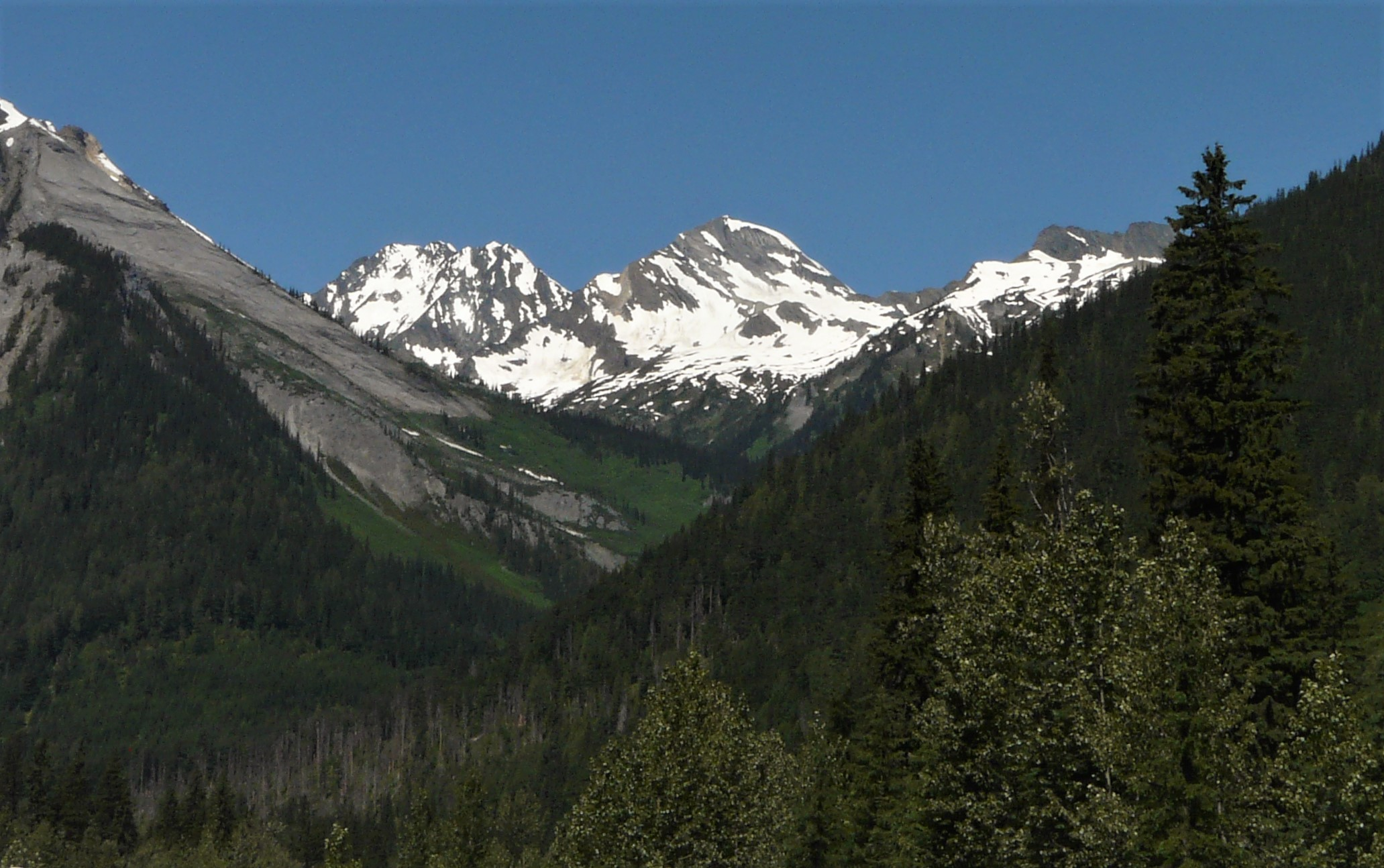
- Southeast aspect, centered, from Highway 1 (Bagheera Mountain to immediate left)

Highest point
- Elevation: 2,733 m (8,967 ft)
- Prominence: 222 m (728 ft)
- Parent peak: Bagheera Mountain (2,757 m)
- Isolation: 0.91 km (0.57 mi)
- Listing: Mountains of British Columbia
- Coordinates: 51°17′15″N 117°37′20″W

Naming
- Etymology: Catamount

Geography
- Location within British Columbia Location within Canada
- Interactive map of Catamount Peak
- Country: Canada
- Province: British Columbia
- District: Kootenay Land District
- Protected area: Glacier National Park
- Parent range: Hermit Range; Selkirk Mountains
- Topo map: NTS 82N5 Glacier

Climbing
- First ascent: 1902 by Arthur Oliver Wheeler and Topographic Survey party

Catamount Peak is a 2,733-metre (8,967-foot) mountain located in Glacier National Park in British Columbia, Canada. Catamount Peak is part of the Hermit Range of the Selkirk Mountains and is 7 km (4.3 mi) west of Rogers Pass. It is approximately midway between Revelstoke and Golden. Neighbors include Cheops Mountain, 5.05 km (3.14 mi) to the east, and Ursus Major Mountain, 1.83 km (1.14 mi) to the northeast. Precipitation runoff from the mountain's south slope drains to Illecillewaet River via Cougar Brook, and the north slope drains to the Beaver River via Ursus Creek. Topographic relief is significant as the summit rises 1,230 metres (4,035 ft) above Ursus Creek in 2 km (1.2 mi) and 930 m (3,051 ft) above Cougar Brook in 1 km (0.62 mi). This peak is visible from the Trans-Canada Highway.

== Etymology ==
Catamount Peak was so named by a Dominion Topographic Survey party that made the first ascent of this peak in 1902, in keeping with the wildcat naming theme of nearby peaks such as Cougar Mountain and Bagheera Mountain. "Catamount" is shortened from the 17th-century "cat-of-the-mountain", and is synonymous with cougar, mountain lion, or any variety of wild cat. The mountain's toponym was officially adopted on March 31, 1917, by the Geographical Names Board of Canada.

== Climate ==
Based on the Köppen climate classification, Catamount Peak is located in a subarctic climate zone with cold, snowy winters, and mild summers. Winter temperatures can drop below −20 °C with wind chill factors below −30 °C.

== Gallery ==
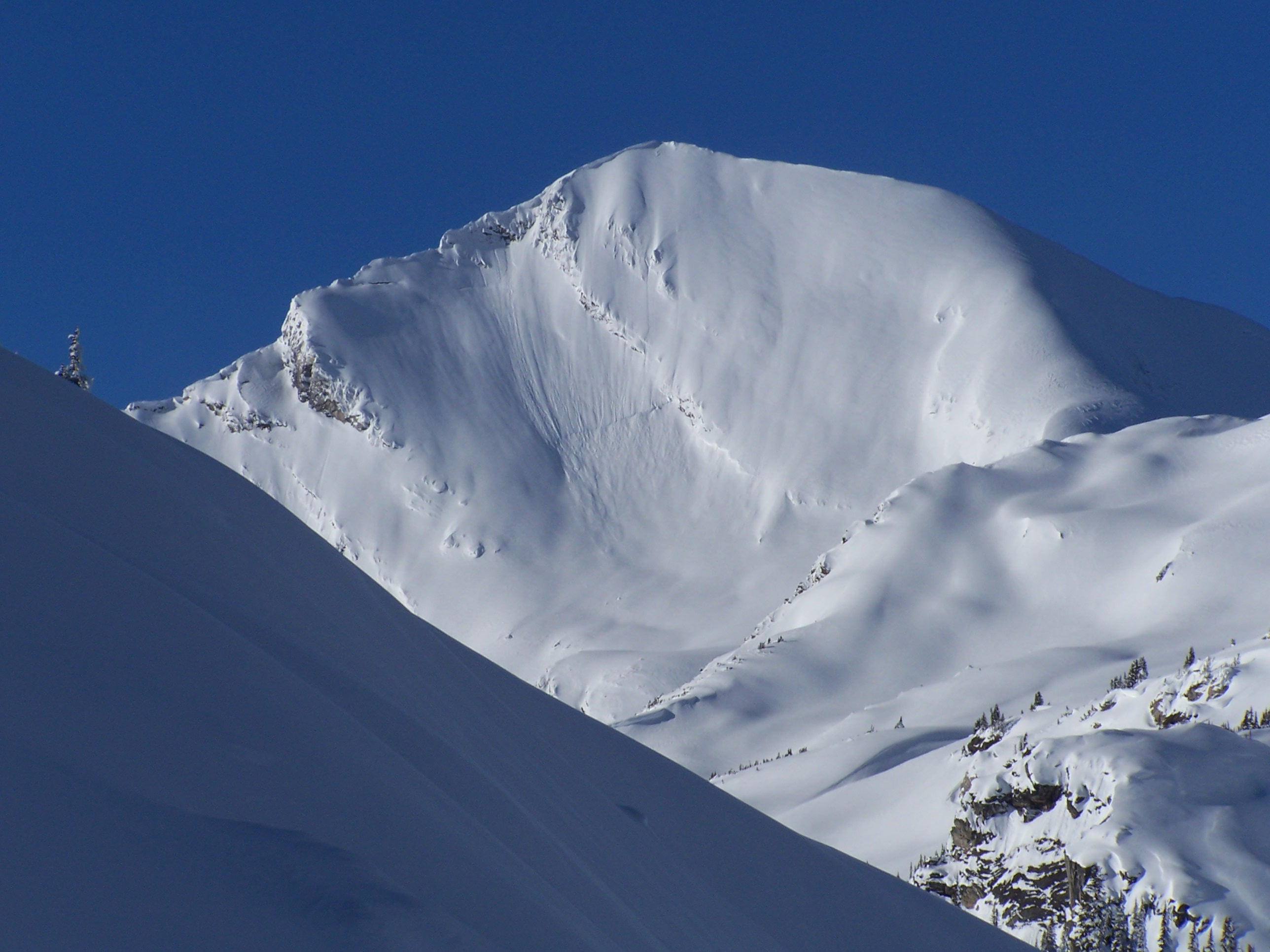
East aspect in winter

== See also ==
- Geography of British Columbia
