= Gertrude Benham =

English mountaineer, traveller and collector (1867–1938)

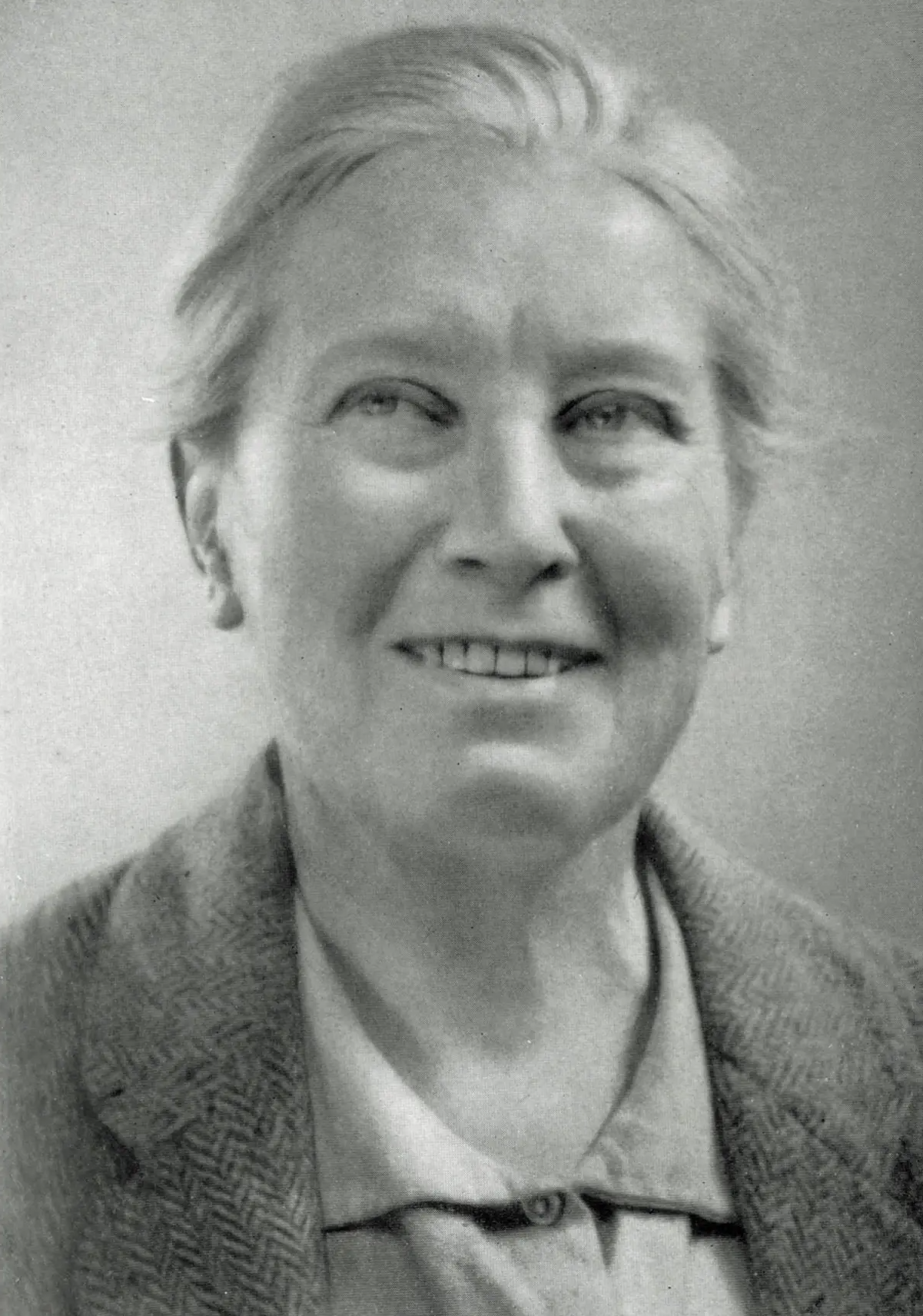
- Benham in c.1934
- Born: Gertrude Emily Benham; 29 July 1867; London, U.K.
- Died: February 1938
- Other name: Truda Benham

Gertrude Emily Benham known as Truda Benham (29 July 1867– February 1938) was an English explorer and mountaineer, who climbed over 300 mountains. She was the first woman to climb Mt. Kilimanjaro.

She climbed mountains on almost every continent and was an intrepid hiker, walking from Valparaiso, Chile, to Buenos Aires, Argentina. She went on to hike across Kenya, and traverse Africa on foot. Benham drew as she travelled, and her drawings were later used in mapping the countries she explored. Benham always travelled alone or with indigenous or local guides, spending less than £250 (pounds sterling) a year. In 1916, she was named a fellow of the Royal Geographical Society.

Truda Peaks, one of the summits of Mount Rogers in Glacier National Park, in the Selkirk Mountains of British Columbia, Canada, are named in her honour. Her climbing boots are on display in the Plymouth City Museum and Art Gallery.

== Life ==
Gertrude Emily Benham was born on 29 July 1867 in Marylebone, London, the youngest of six children of Emily (nee Lucas) and Frank Benham. Her maternal grandfather was a brewer. The successful family ironmongery business, Benham and Sons Ltd, established by her paternal grandfather John Lee Benham, moved into making stoves and cooking equipment. Her father took her on alpine climbing holidays each year and she became an experienced mountaineer. She had in time to care for her parents, but she managed to climb 130 mountains before her father died in 1891 and her mother in 1903. She had an inheritance that allowed her to choose her occupation and she chose travelling and mountaineering.

== Early travels ==
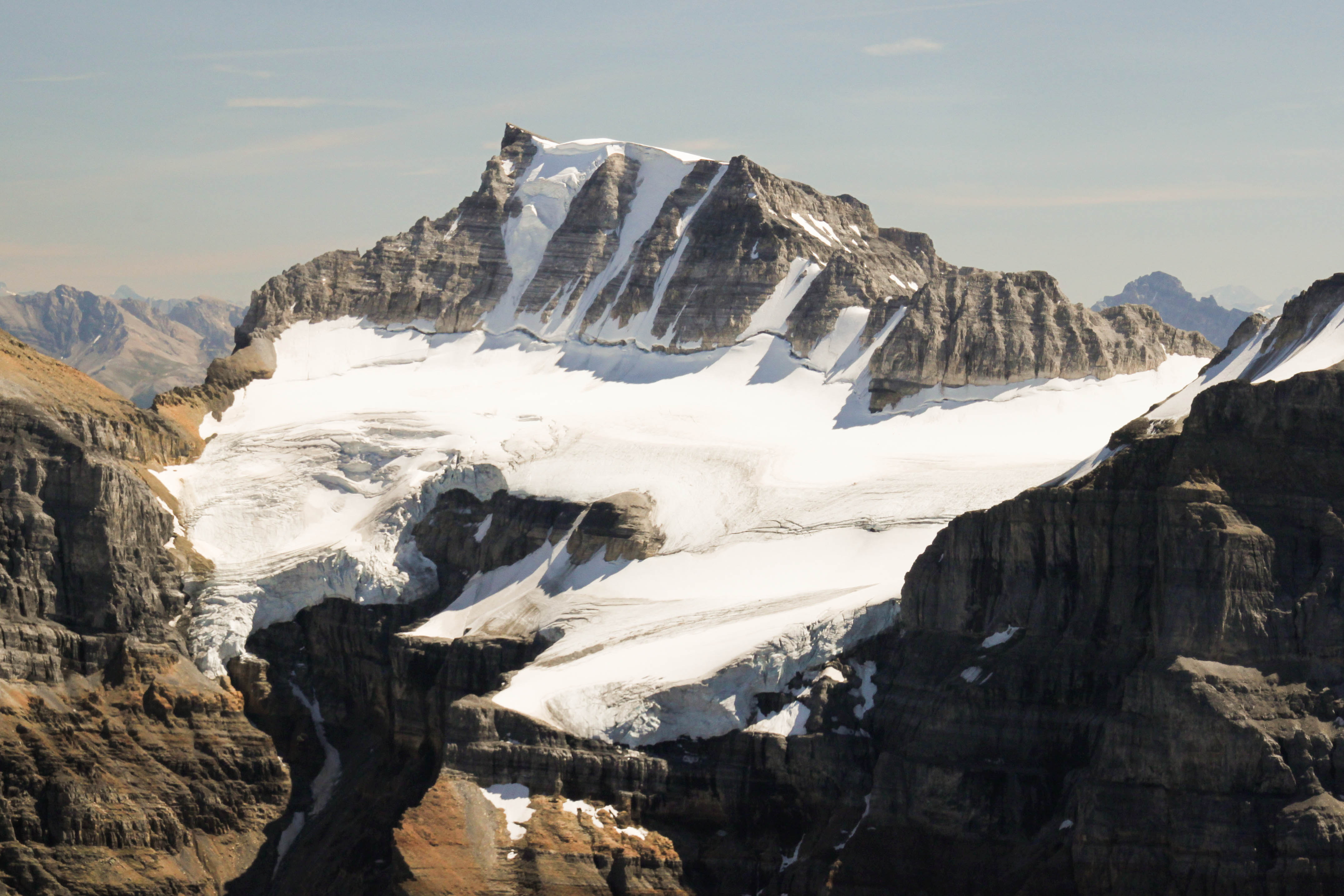
Mount Fay and the Fay Glacier

Benham travelled to Canada in 1904 and visited Banff, Alberta. New areas of Canada were more accessible because of the railway. She stayed on Lake Louise. On 27 June, she made an ascent of Mount Lefroy with Mr Frost and the brothers Hans and Christian Kaufmann as guides. She ascended several other major peaks including the first ascent of Mount Fay. She beat a rival party to the top that was led by Charles Ernest Fay. Fay was annoyed that Benham had climbed "his" mountain first and decided to climb a nearby peak instead. However Benham had already been there and the Truda Peak is named in her honour.

In 1905, Benham climbed in the Southern Alps alone and visited Tasmania and Australia. She made her way back to England via Japan, India, Egypt and Corsica.

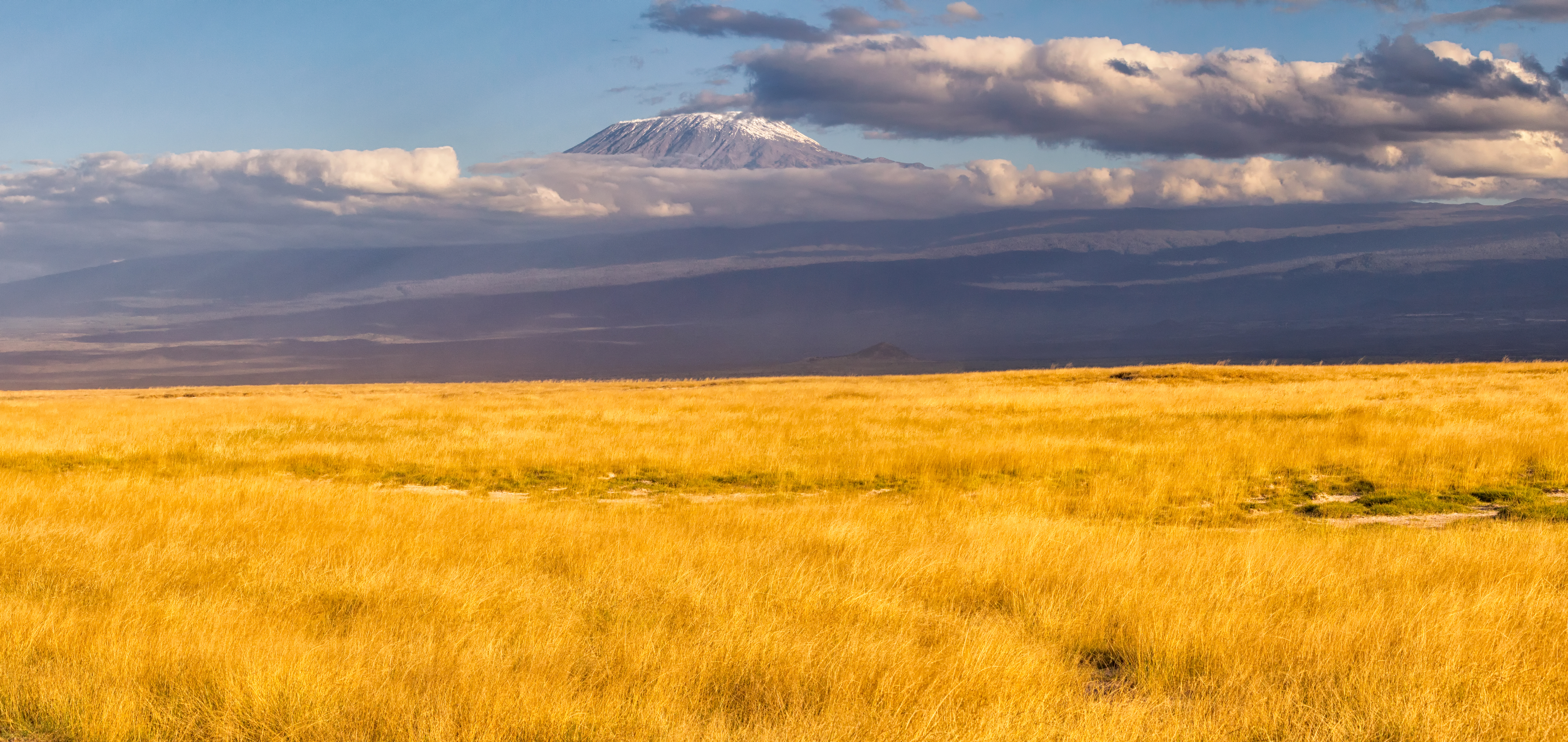
Kibo Summit of Mount Kilimanjaro in Tanzania

Benham's second trip around the World occurred in 1908. She travelled west-to-east, visiting Japan and California. She disembarked at Valparaíso, and then crossed the Andes and Pampas to arrive in Buenos Aires. In 1909, she travelled to central Africa, arriving in Broken Hill, Northern Rhodesia (Kabwe in Zambia). She walked 900 kilometres to Abercorn (Mbala) near the southern tip of Lake Tanganyika. From there, she proceeded to Uganda and Kenya where she attempted the summit of Mount Kilimanjaro reaching 5159 metres.

She funded her travels on an allowance of £250 per annum. In 2025 that (1904) money might be worth £38,000 p.a.

Back in Africa in 1913, she disembarked on the Niger delta and made her way to Kano, Nigeria. Her route took her through Cameroon, down the Ubangi, up the Congo to Stanleyville (now Kisangani), then through the Ituri Rainforest to Mbarara, Uganda. Diverting west through Rwanda, she ascended Mount Nyiragongo (3,470 metres; 11,380 ft) and reached the crater of an unnamed volcano that had erupted in December 1912. She climbed to the summit of Mount Mulanje in present day Malawi. She then travelled on the Nyasaland railway until she took a steamer on the River Shire to Chinde in Mozambique, arriving in October 1913.

In 1914, Benham visited India and ventured for the third time into the Himalayas. She trekked across the mountains, reaching Srinagar in Kashmir.

== First World War and later years ==
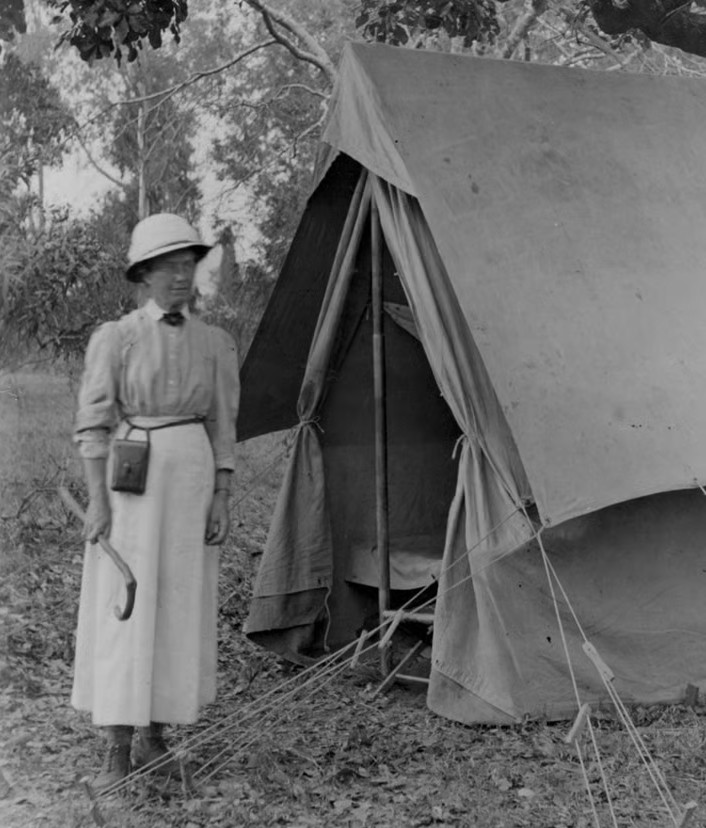
Gertrude Benham and her tent

The First World War kept Benham in England. She joined the Royal Geographical Society for six months before she fell out with their expectations of her and she corresponded with the Natural History Museum.

She resumed her travels in 1919. Back in India, Benham undertook a journey through the mountains from Nainital, near the western border of Nepal, to Leh in Ladakh. In 1921 she travelled to East Africa, where she ascended Mount Elgon. She then voyaged to Australia and the South Pacific, returning to England in October 1923, and ending her fifth trip around the world.

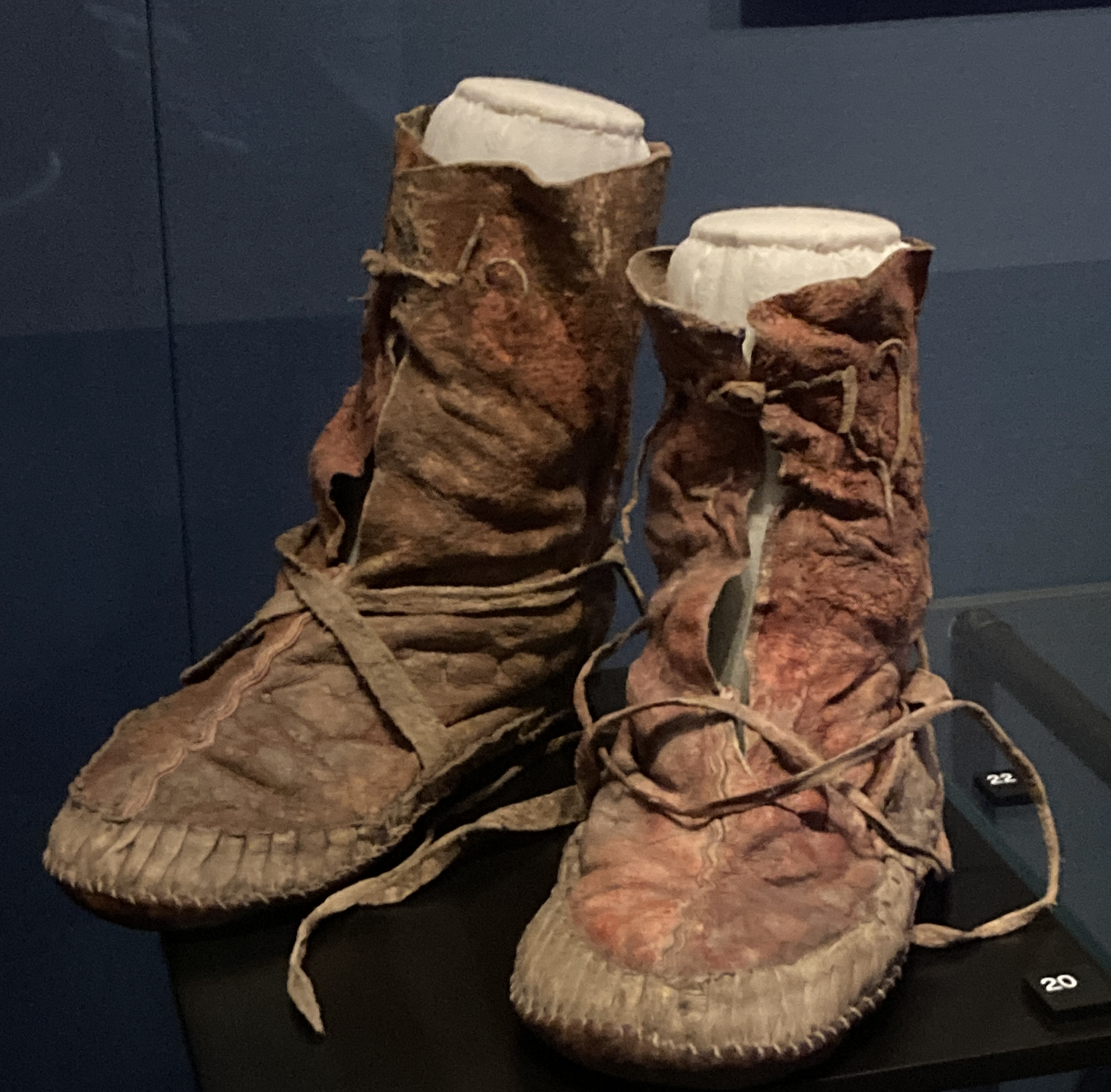
Gertrude Benham's boots on display in The Box, Plymouth

In 1924 she was back in India receiving several refusals from the Anglo-Indian administration to her requests to enter Tibet.

Benham started her sixth trip around the world in 1926. She visited Natal, Zanzibar, Sudan, Egypt, Syria, India, Malaya and the East Indies. She arrived in Hong Kong in 1927, crossed the Pacific to arrive in California, and explored Guatemala, Belize, the West Indies and Trinidad. She disembarked at Plymouth, in Devon in 1928. Later that year, she visited Taiwan, Burma (Myanmar), Celebes, Java and China.

She tried again in 1929 to enter Tibet and go back to the Himalayas, but permission was not granted. She made a third attempt to enter the Himalayas, this time through the mountains of Kumaon beyond the western border of Nepal.

Benham circumnavigated the globe a seventh time in 1933, passing by the British port of Hong Kong and in California before travelling south to Mollendo in Peru and Valparaíso in Chile.

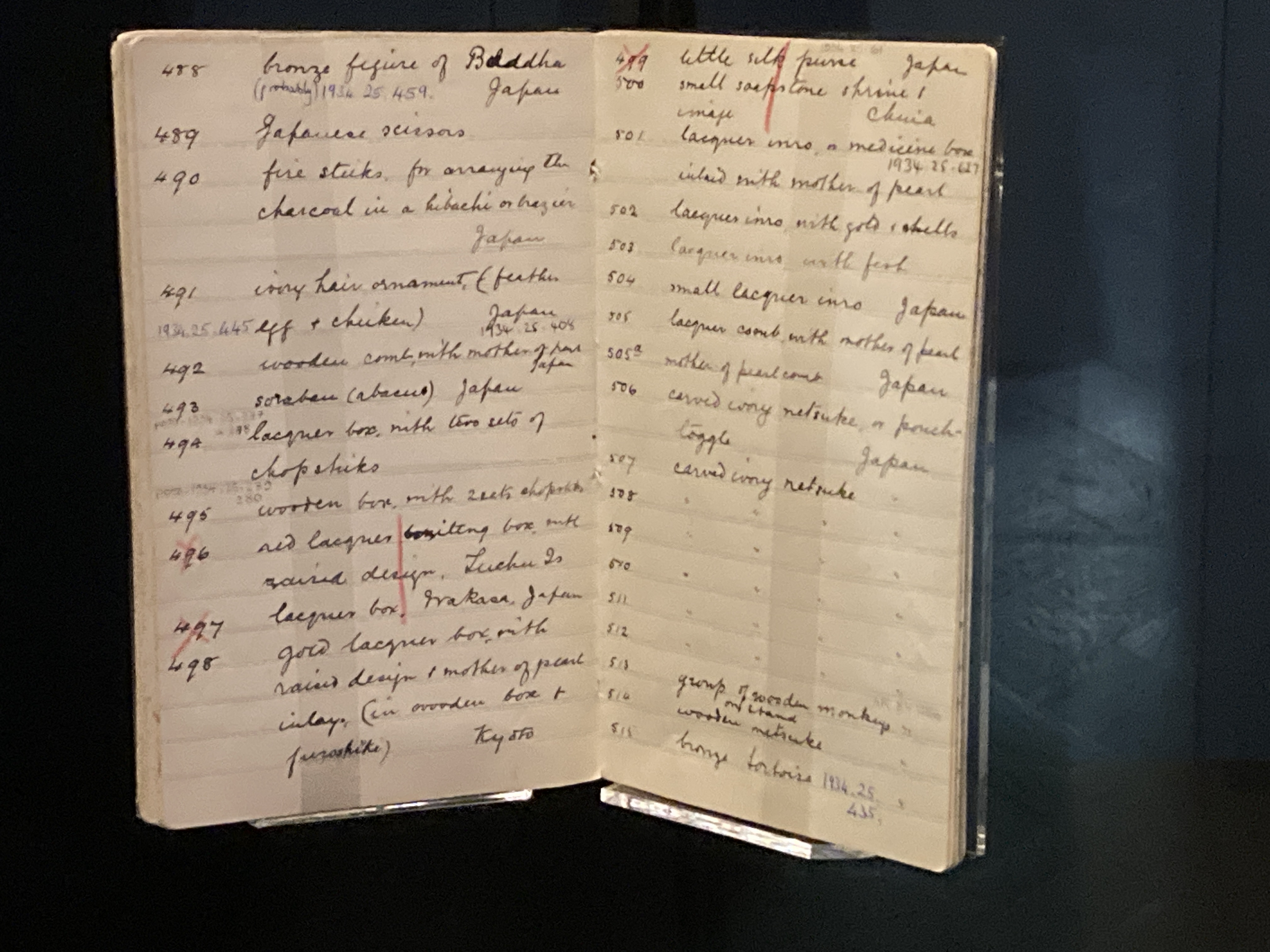
Gertrude Benham's "Catalogue of Museum" notebook c. 1934

Benham presented the Benham Collection to the Plymouth City Museum and Art Gallery in 1934. She chose Plymouth because she had been impressed on a visit to the museum. Her collection consisted of hundreds of items, including jewellery, costumes, accessories, metalwork, lacquer ware, ceramics, toys and religious articles. Some of the objects from her collection are on display, including a pair of her boots which she wore whilst travelling in Leh in Ladakh, and her "Catalogue of Museum" notebook recording the details of the 447 objects she acquired on her travels. It is believed that other items may still be discovered.

== Last journey and death ==
Benham started her "last journey" in 1935. She travelled to the New Hebrides (Vanuatu), New Zealand and returned via Hong Kong and India. In 1937, she boarded a ship from Sri Lanka to South Africa. Benham died in February 1938 on board a ship bound from Africa to England. She was buried at sea and her obituary appeared in The Times ten months later.

In 2019, the New York Times ran her obituary in their Overlooked No More series, noting that she had been overlooked by the media.
