= Mount Sifton =

Mountain in the country of Canada

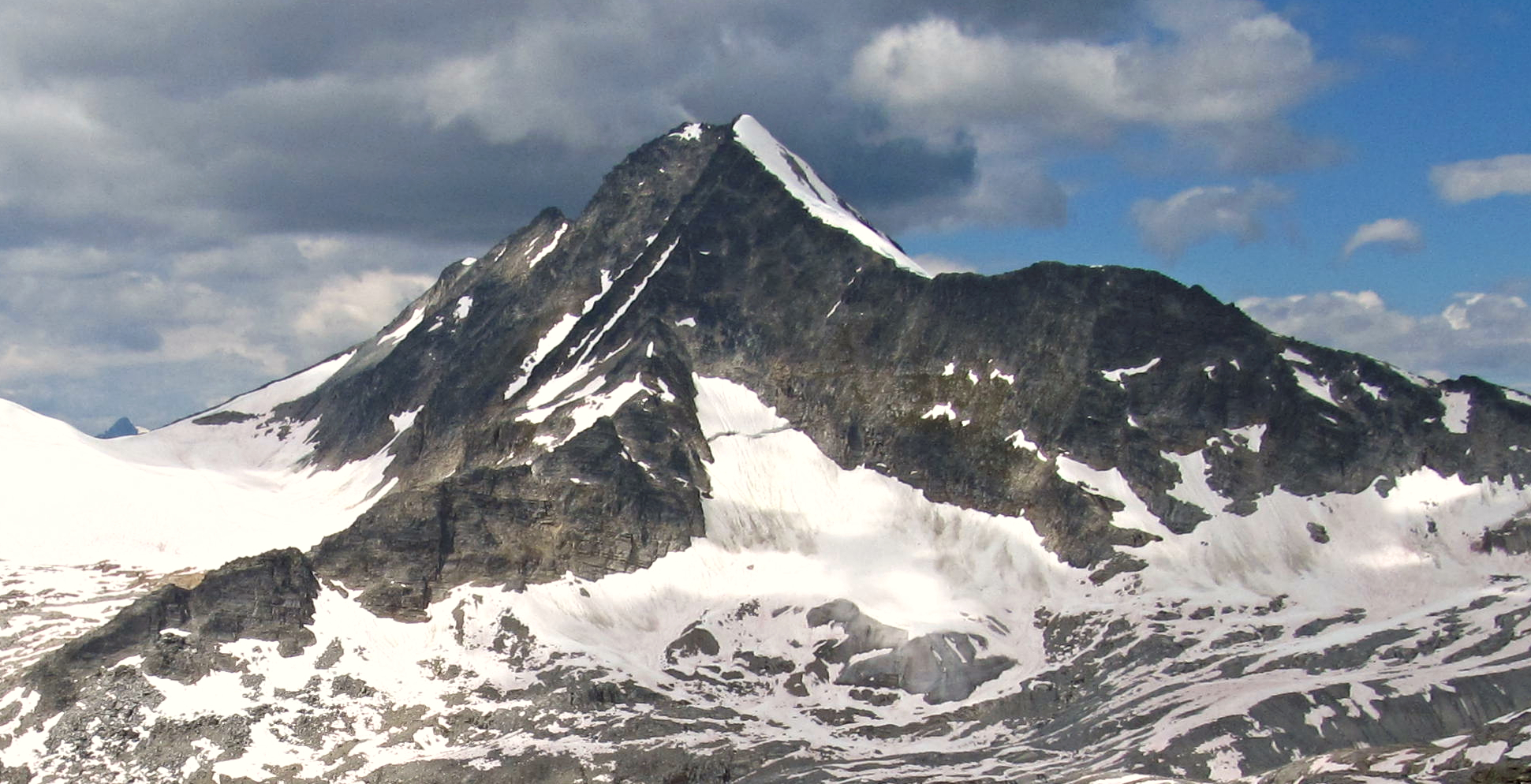
- Mount Sifton, east aspect

Highest point
- Elevation: 2,922 m (9,587 ft)
- Prominence: 365 m (1,198 ft)
- Parent peak: Mount Rogers (3,169 m)
- Listing: Mountains of British Columbia
- Coordinates: 51°20′11″N 117°33′10″W

Geography
- Location within British Columbia Location within Canada
- Interactive map of Mount Sifton
- Country: Canada
- Province: British Columbia
- District: Kootenay Land District
- Protected area: Glacier National Park
- Parent range: Hermit Range; Selkirk Mountains
- Topo map: NTS 82N5 Glacier

Climbing
- First ascent: 1900 Arthur Michael, Edward Feuz, Friedrich Michel
- Easiest route: class 3 Scrambling South Face

Mount Sifton is a 2,922-metre (9,587-foot) mountain summit located in Glacier National Park, in the Hermit Range of the Selkirk Mountains in British Columbia, Canada. Mount Sifton is situated 58 km (36 mi) northeast of Revelstoke, and 41 km (25 mi) west of Golden. It is also set 2.35 km (1.46 mi) north-northeast of Grizzly Mountain, and 4.5 km (2.8 mi) northwest of Rogers Pass from which it can be seen from the Trans-Canada Highway. The nearest higher peak is Mount Rogers, 2.17 km (1.35 mi) to the north-northeast. The first ascent of the mountain was made September 3, 1900, by Arthur Michael, Edward Feuz, and Friedrich Michel via the southeast ridge. The peak's name honors Sir Clifford Sifton (1861–1929), Canadian Minister of the Interior from 1896 through 1905. The mountain's toponym was adopted in 1906, then re-approved September 8, 1932, by the Geographical Names Board of Canada.

== Climate ==
Based on the Köppen climate classification, Mount Sifton is located in a subarctic climate zone with cold, snowy winters, and mild summers. Winter temperatures can drop below −20 °C with wind chill factors below −30 °C. Precipitation runoff from the mountain and meltwater from surrounding glaciers on its slopes drains into tributaries of the Beaver River and Illecillewaet River.

== Climbing Routes ==
Established climbing routes on Mount Sifton:

- Southeast Ridge - class 4 First ascent 1900
- South Face - class 3 FA 1932
- North Face - FA 1970
- West Ridge - class 5.0
- Northwest Ridge - class 3 FA 1984

== Gallery ==
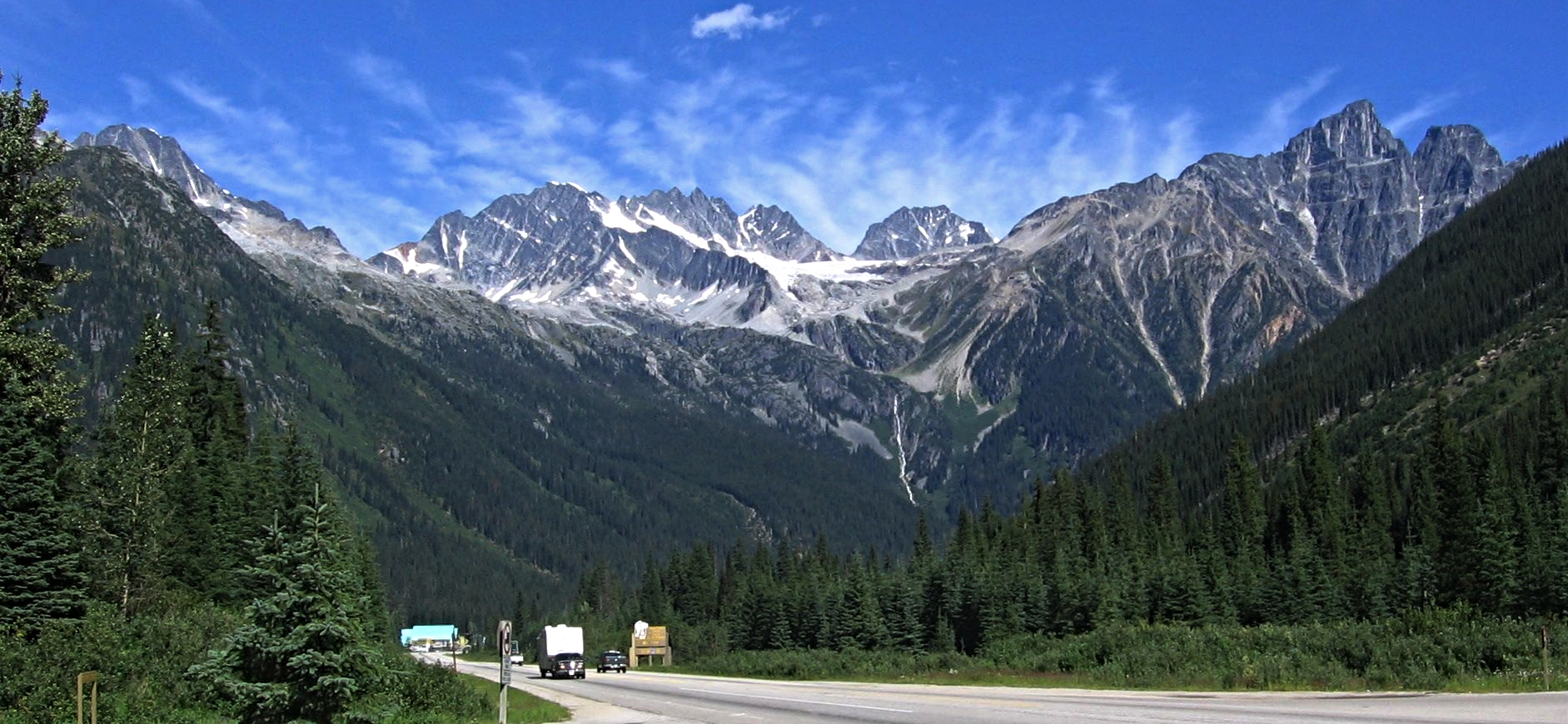
Rogers Pass with Sifton in upper left partly covered. Mount Tupper far right, Mount Rogers in the middle

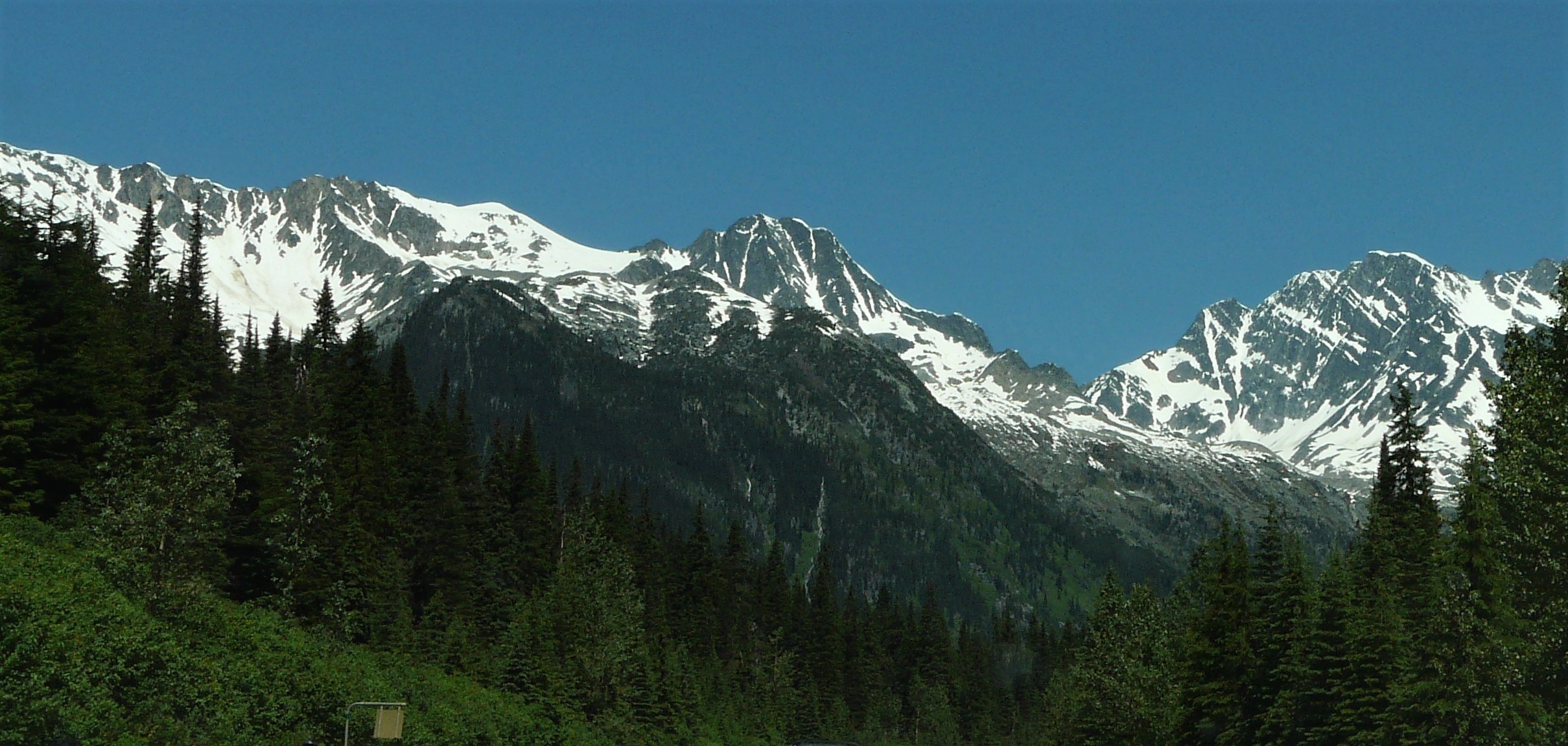
Southeast aspect of Mount Sifton (centre) seen from Trans-Canada Highway

== See also ==
- Geography of British Columbia
- Geology of British Columbia
