= Ursus Major Mountain =

Mountain in British Columbia, Canada

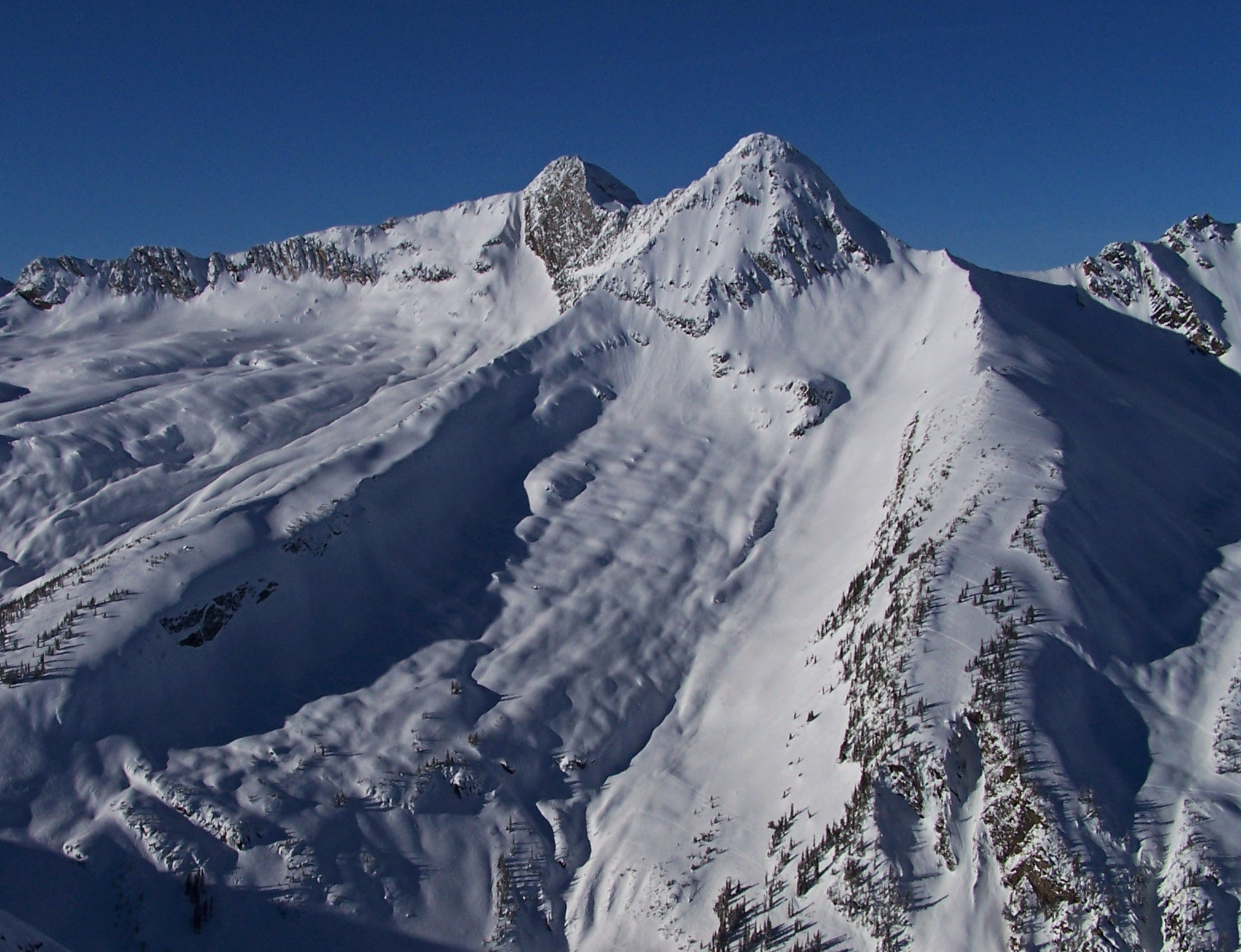
- Ursus Major with Balu Peak, from southeast

Highest point
- Elevation: 2,705 m (8,875 ft)
- Prominence: 235 m (771 ft)
- Parent peak: Ursus Minor Mountain (2749 m)
- Listing: Mountains of British Columbia
- Coordinates: 51°17′53″N 117°36′07″W

Geography
- Location within British Columbia Location within Canada
- Country: Canada
- Province: British Columbia
- District: Kootenay Land District
- Protected area: Glacier National Park
- Parent range: Hermit Range; Selkirk Mountains
- Topo map: NTS 82N5 Glacier

Climbing
- First ascent: 1902, Dominion Topographic Survey party

Ursus Major Mountain is a 2,705-metre (8,875-foot) mountain summit located in Glacier National Park, in the Hermit Range of the Selkirk Mountains in British Columbia, Canada. Ursus Major Mountain is situated 5.5 km (3.4 mi) west of Rogers Pass, 52 km (32 mi) northeast of Revelstoke, and 44 km (27 mi) west of Golden. Its nearest higher peaks are Catamount Peak, 1.8 km (1.1 mi) to the southwest, and Ursus Minor Mountain, 2.24 km (1.39 mi) to the northeast. The first ascent of the mountain was made August 5, 1902, by a Dominion Topographic Survey party. The mountain's name was adopted in 1906, then re-approved September 8, 1932, by the Geographical Names Board of Canada. It was so-named by the survey party because of its proximity above Bear Creek (since renamed Connaught Creek), and in keeping with the bear theme of other nearby features such as Ursus Minor Mountain, Grizzly Mountain, Bruins Pass, and Balu Pass. The high point on Ursus Major's east ridge is unofficially called Balu Peak.

== Climate ==
Based on the Köppen climate classification, Ursus Major Mountain is located in a subarctic climate zone with cold, snowy winters, and mild summers. Temperatures can drop below −20 °C with wind chill factors below −30 °C. Precipitation runoff from the mountain and meltwater from small unnamed glaciers on its slopes drains into tributaries of the Illecillewaet River and Beaver River.

== See also ==
- Geography of British Columbia
- Geology of British Columbia
