= Mount Rogers (British Columbia) =

Mountain in British Columbia, Canada

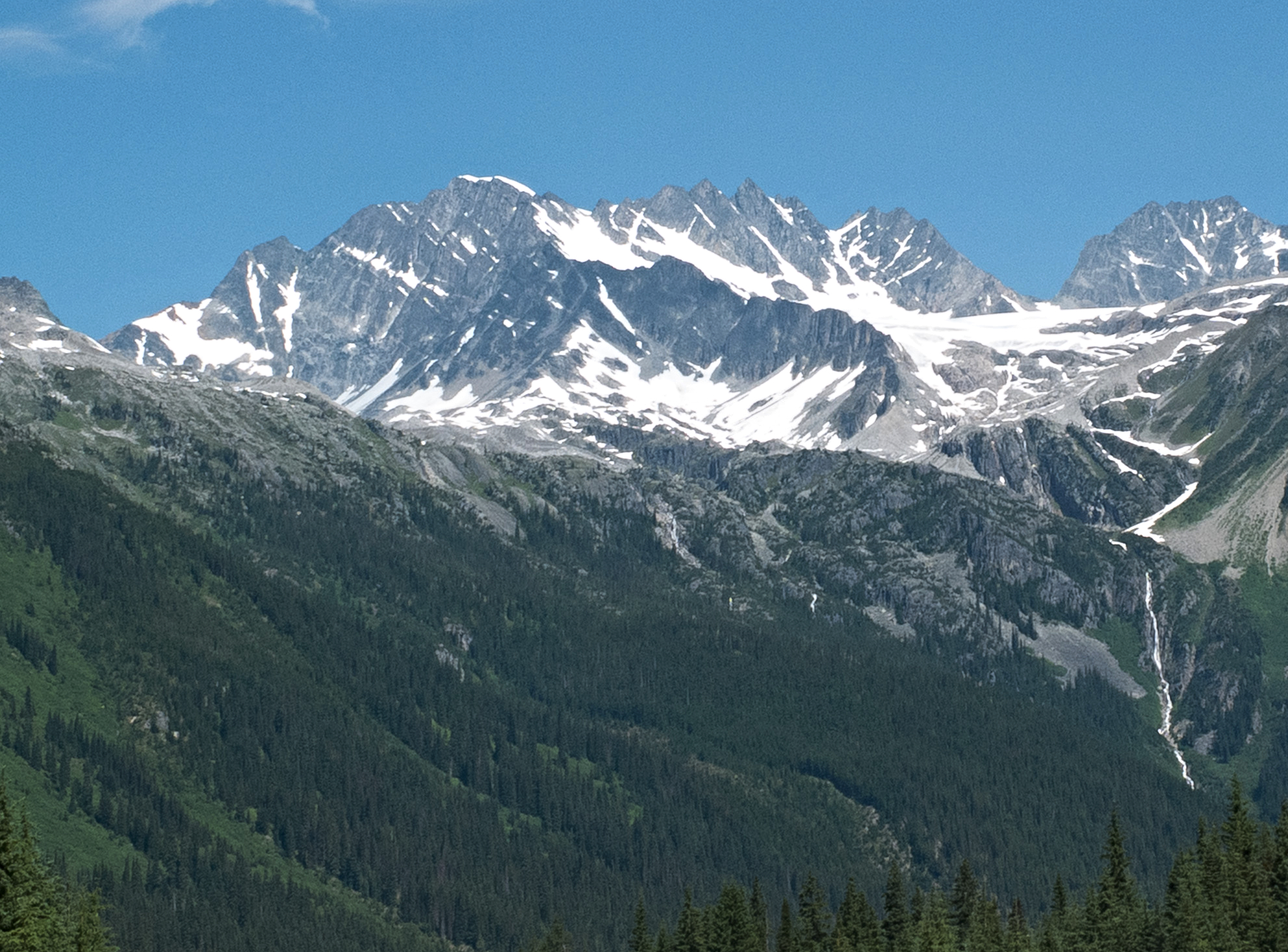
- Mount Rogers as seen from Rogers Pass (Hermit Mountain in upper right)

Highest point
- Elevation: 3,169 m (10,397 ft)
- Prominence: 1,439 m (4,721 ft)
- Parent peak: Iconoclast Mountain (3236 m)
- Listing: Mountains of British Columbia
- Coordinates: 51°21′14″N 117°32′14″W

Geography
- Location within British Columbia Location within Canada
- Interactive map of Mount Rogers
- Country: Canada
- Province: British Columbia
- District: Kootenay Land District
- Protected area: Glacier National Park
- Parent range: Hermit Range ← Selkirk Mountains
- Topo map: NTS 82N5 Glacier

Climbing
- First ascent: 1896 Phillip S Abbott, George T Little, Charles S Thompson
- Easiest route: Scrambling YDS 4

Mount Rogers, is a 3,169-metre (10,397-foot) massif located in Glacier National Park in the Selkirk Mountains of British Columbia, Canada. Mount Rogers is situated at the north end of the Hermit Range, and is the highest point of the range. Its nearest higher peak is Mount Sir Donald, 12.57 km (7.81 mi) to the southeast. The peak is prominently visible from eastbound Highway 1, the Trans-Canada Highway at Rogers Pass. The Rogers massif includes five individually-named summits: Rogers Peak, Grant Peak, Fleming Peak, Swiss Peak, and Truda Peaks. Numerous glaciers radiate from all sides, including the Rogers Glacier, Swiss Glacier, Tupper Glacier, and Hermit Glacier.

== History ==
Mount Rogers was named after Major A.B. Rogers, an American surveyor working for the Canadian Pacific Railway, and the discoverer of Rogers Pass.

The first ascent of the mountain was made on July 31, 1896 by Phillip S. Abbott, George T. Little, and Charles S. Thompson.

The Truda Peak(s) are named for Gertrude Benham who climbed them and Swiss Peak before she was the first to climb Mount Fay.

The mountain's name was officially adopted in 1932 when approved by the Geographical Names Board of Canada.

== Climate ==
Based on the Köppen climate classification, Mount Rogers has a subarctic climate with cold, snowy winters, and mild summers. Winter temperatures can drop below −20 °C with wind chill factors below −30 °C. Precipitation runoff from the mountain drains into tributaries of the Beaver River.

== Gallery ==
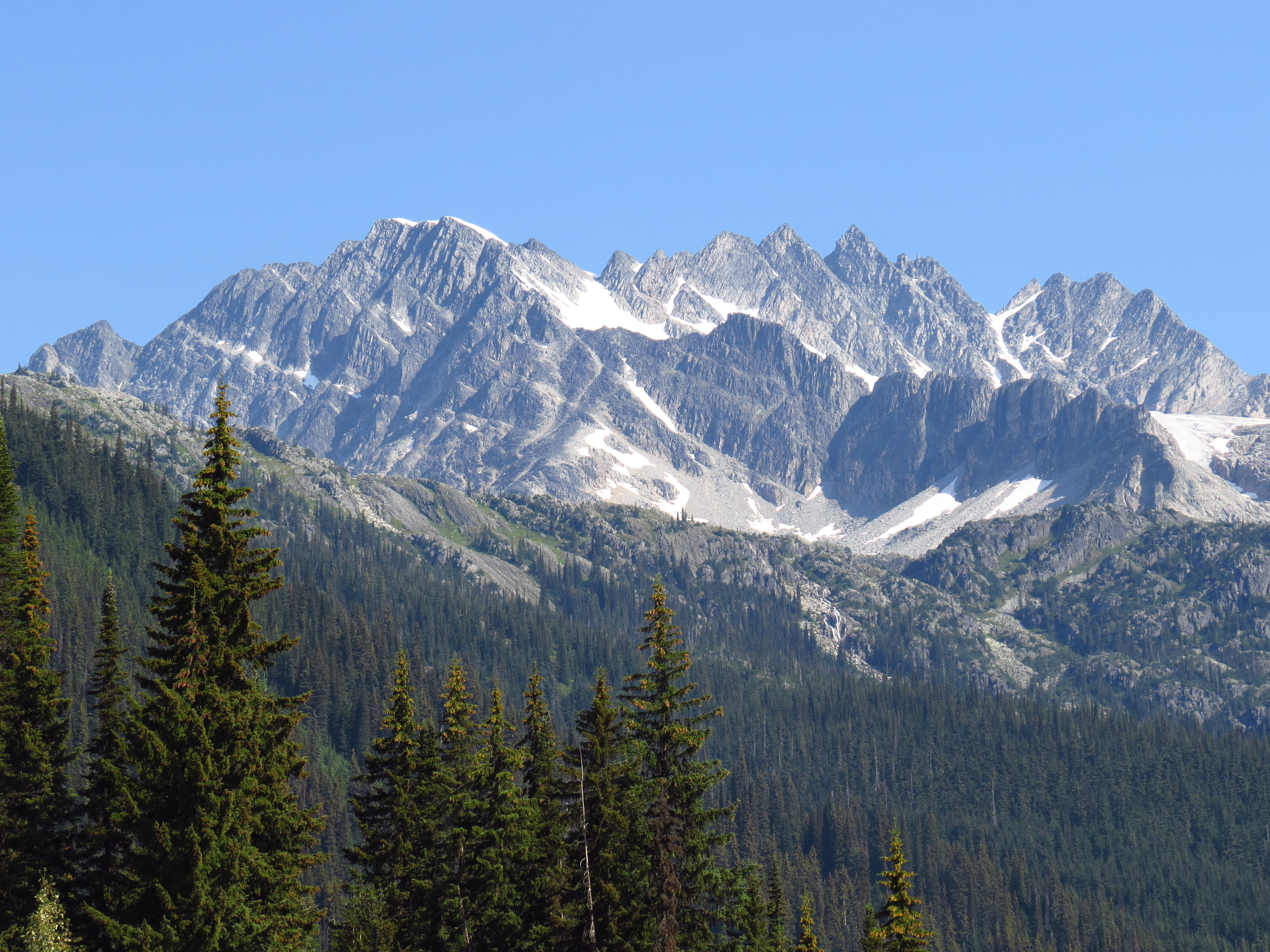

== See also ==
- Geography of British Columbia
- Geology of British Columbia
