= Mount Tupper =

Mountain in British Columbia, Canada

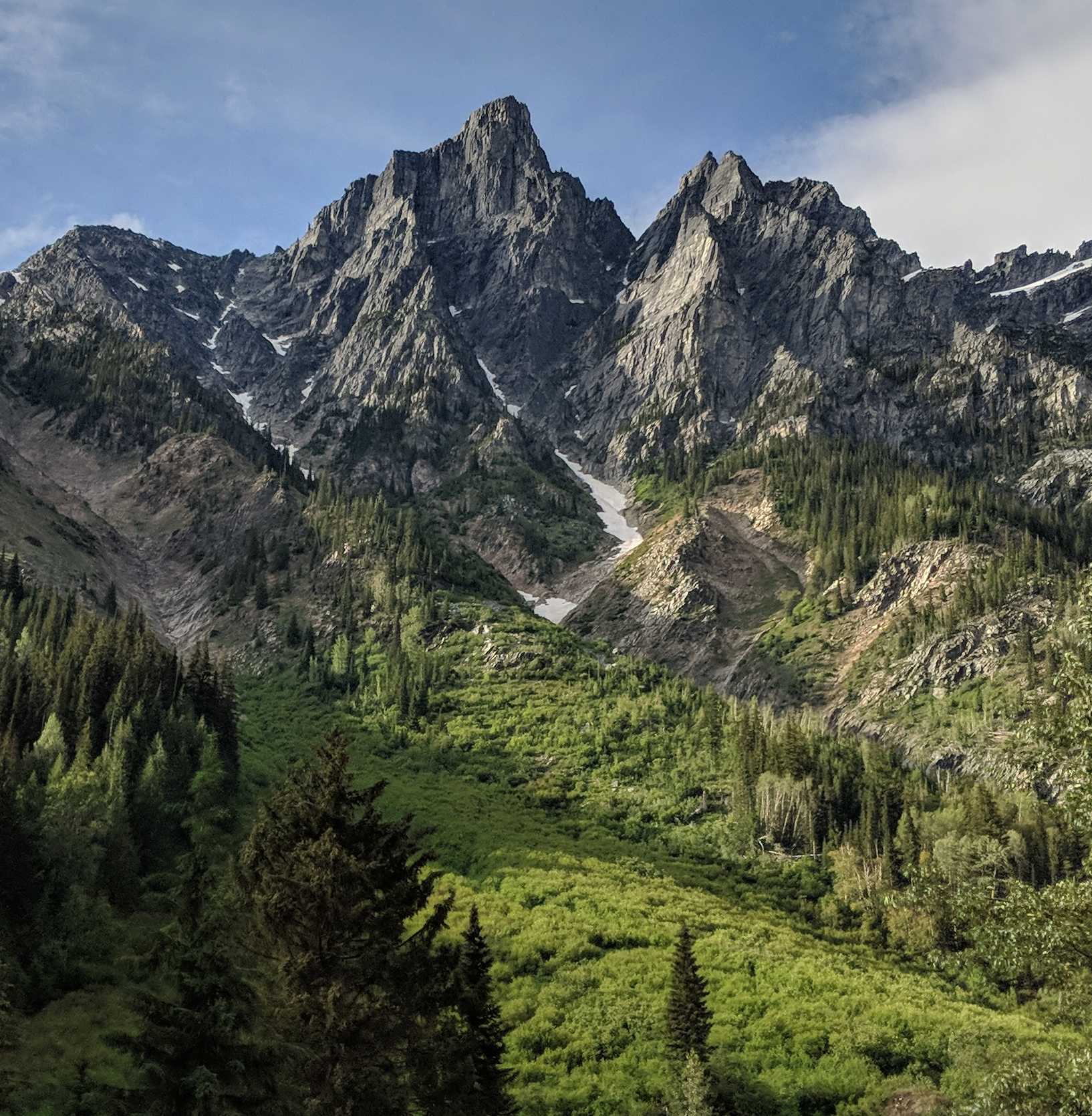
- Mount Tupper seen from Highway 1

Highest point
- Elevation: 2,804 m (9,199 ft)
- Prominence: 254 m (833 ft)
- Parent peak: Swiss Peak
- Coordinates: 51°20′09″N 117°29′55″W

Geography
- Location within British Columbia
- Interactive map of Mount Tupper
- Location: British Columbia, Canada
- District: Kootenay Land District
- Parent range: Selkirk Mountains
- Topo map: NTS 82N6 Blaeberry

Geology
- Rock type: quartzite

Climbing
- First ascent: 1906 Wolfgang Koehler, Edward Feuz Jr, Gottfried Feuz

Mount Tupper 2,804 m (9,199 ft) is a mountain about 37 kilometres (23 mi) west of Golden, British Columbia, Canada and three kilometres east of Rogers Pass in Glacier National Park. Part of the Selkirk Mountains, it was formerly named Hermit Mountain until renamed (1887) in honour of Sir Charles Tupper when he was minister of Railways and Canals in Sir John A. Macdonald's cabinet during the siting and construction of the CPR line through the Selkirk Mountains, and later Prime Minister.

== Raspberry Rising Cave ==
In 2013, the mountain was the scene of cave explorations by a team of eight, led by Nicholaus Vieira and funded by the Royal Canadian Geographical Society, who followed the Raspberry Rising cave system for nearly a kilometre, climbing two waterfalls and traversing four sumps. The end of the cave was not reached and further explorations are planned.

== Climate ==
Based on the Köppen climate classification, Mount Tupper is located in a subarctic climate zone with cold, snowy winters, and mild summers. Temperatures can drop below −20 °C with wind chill factors below −30 °C. Precipitation runoff from the mountain drains into the Beaver River which is a tributary of the Columbia River.

== Gallery ==
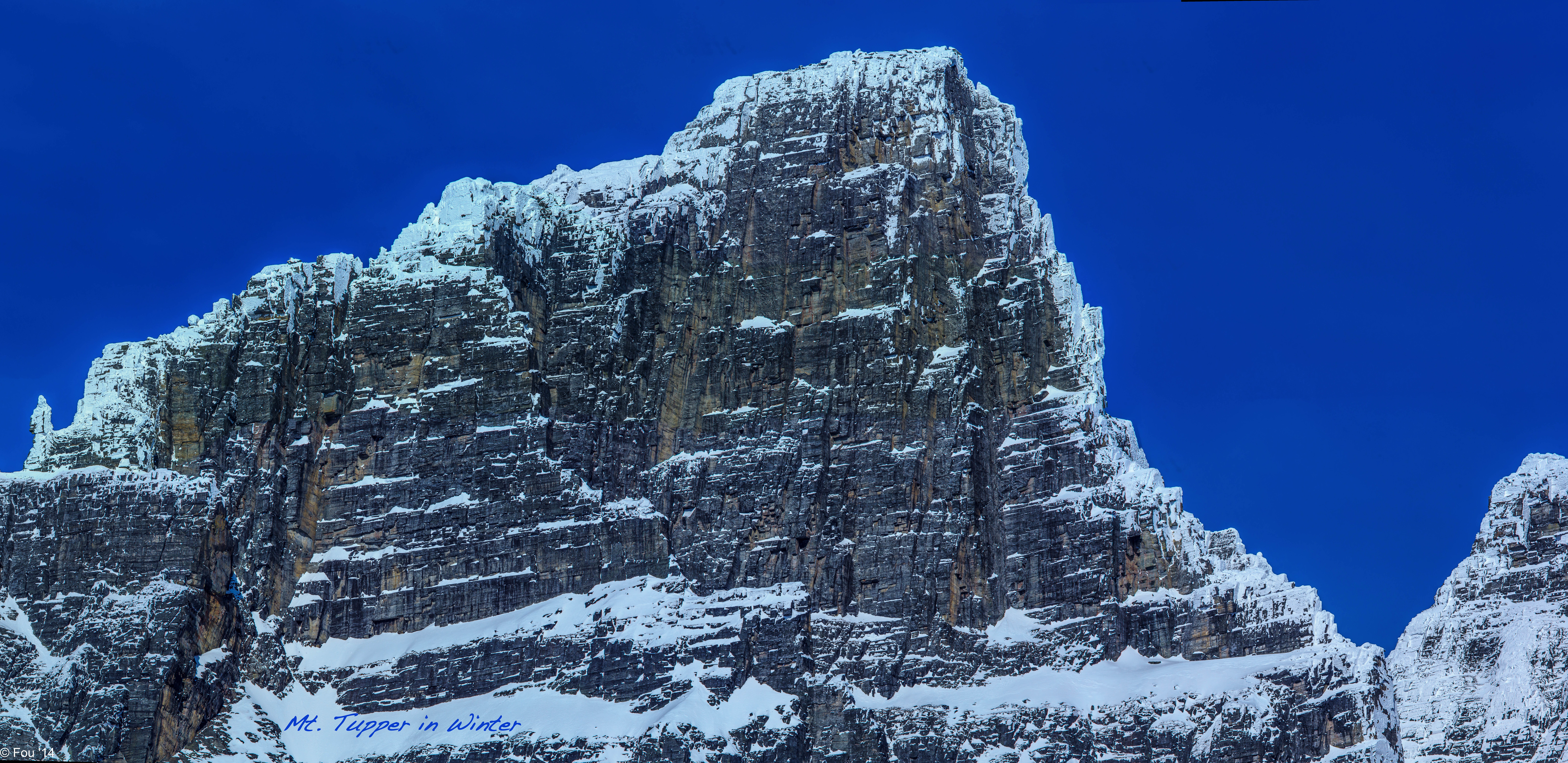
Mount Tupper in winter

== See also ==
- Geology of British Columbia
- Geography of British Columbia
