= Cheops Mountain =

Mountain in British Columbia, Canada

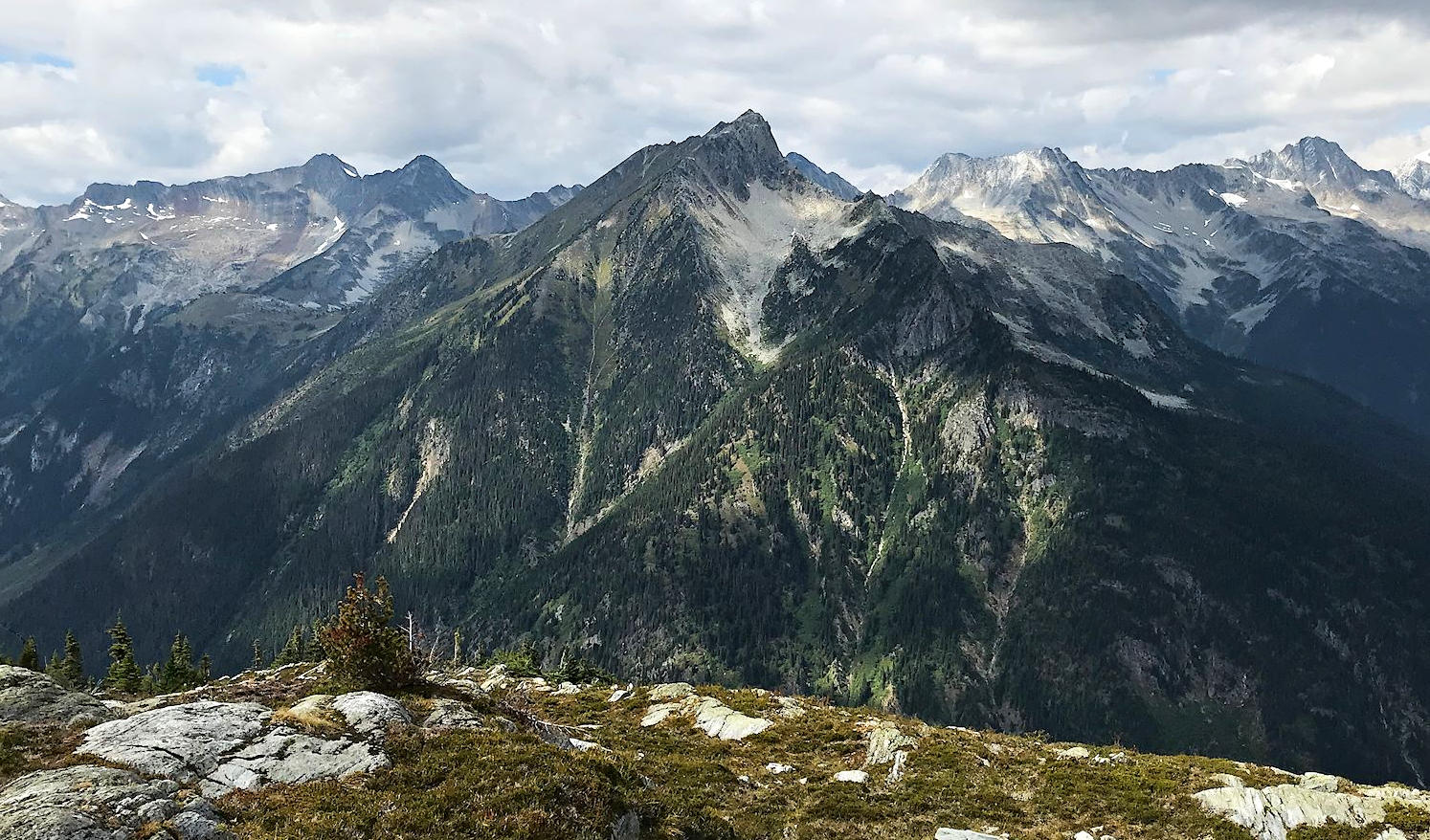
- Cheops Mountain seen from Abbott Ridge

Highest point
- Elevation: 2,581 m (8,468 ft)
- Prominence: 551 m (1,808 ft)
- Parent peak: Ursus Major Mountain (2705 m)
- Listing: Mountains of British Columbia
- Coordinates: 51°16′59″N 117°33′07″W

Geography
- Location within British Columbia Location within Canada
- Interactive map of Cheops Mountain
- Location: Glacier National Park; British Columbia, Canada
- District: Kootenay Land District
- Parent range: Hermit Range, Selkirk Mountains
- Topo map: NTS 82N5 Glacier

Climbing
- First ascent: 1893 Samuel E.S. Allen, Walter D. Wilcox
- Easiest route: Trail to Balu Pass, then Scrambling YDS 3

Cheops Mountain, is a 2,581-metre (8,468-foot) mountain summit located in Glacier National Park in the Selkirk Mountains of British Columbia, Canada. Cheops Mountain is situated in the Hermit Range, and the summit provides a good view of the Hermit and Sir Donald Ranges. Its nearest higher peak is Ursus Major Mountain, 4.0 km (2.5 mi) to the northwest. Cheops is visible from Highway 1, the Trans-Canada Highway at Rogers Pass.

== History ==
The first ascent of the mountain was made in 1893 by Samuel E. S. Allen and Walter D. Wilcox.

The 1910 Rogers Pass avalanche was the deadliest avalanche in Canadian history, resulting in the deaths of 62 Canadian Pacific Railway workers. In the late afternoon of March 4, 1910, an avalanche swept down the slopes of Cheops, burying the railroad tracks in snow. The men were working to clear the tracks when shortly before midnight the deadly slide hit, coming from the opposite side of the valley down Avalanche Mountain.

The mountain's current name was officially adopted in 1951 when approved by the Geographical Names Board of Canada. Prior to that it was known as Mount Cheops. The peak was named by Otto Julius Klotz for its resemblance to the Pyramid of Cheops.

== Climate ==
Based on the Köppen climate classification, Cheops Mountain has a subarctic climate with cold, snowy winters, and mild summers. Winter temperatures can drop below −20 °C with wind chill factors below −30 °C. Precipitation runoff from the mountain drains into the Illecillewaet River.

== Gallery ==
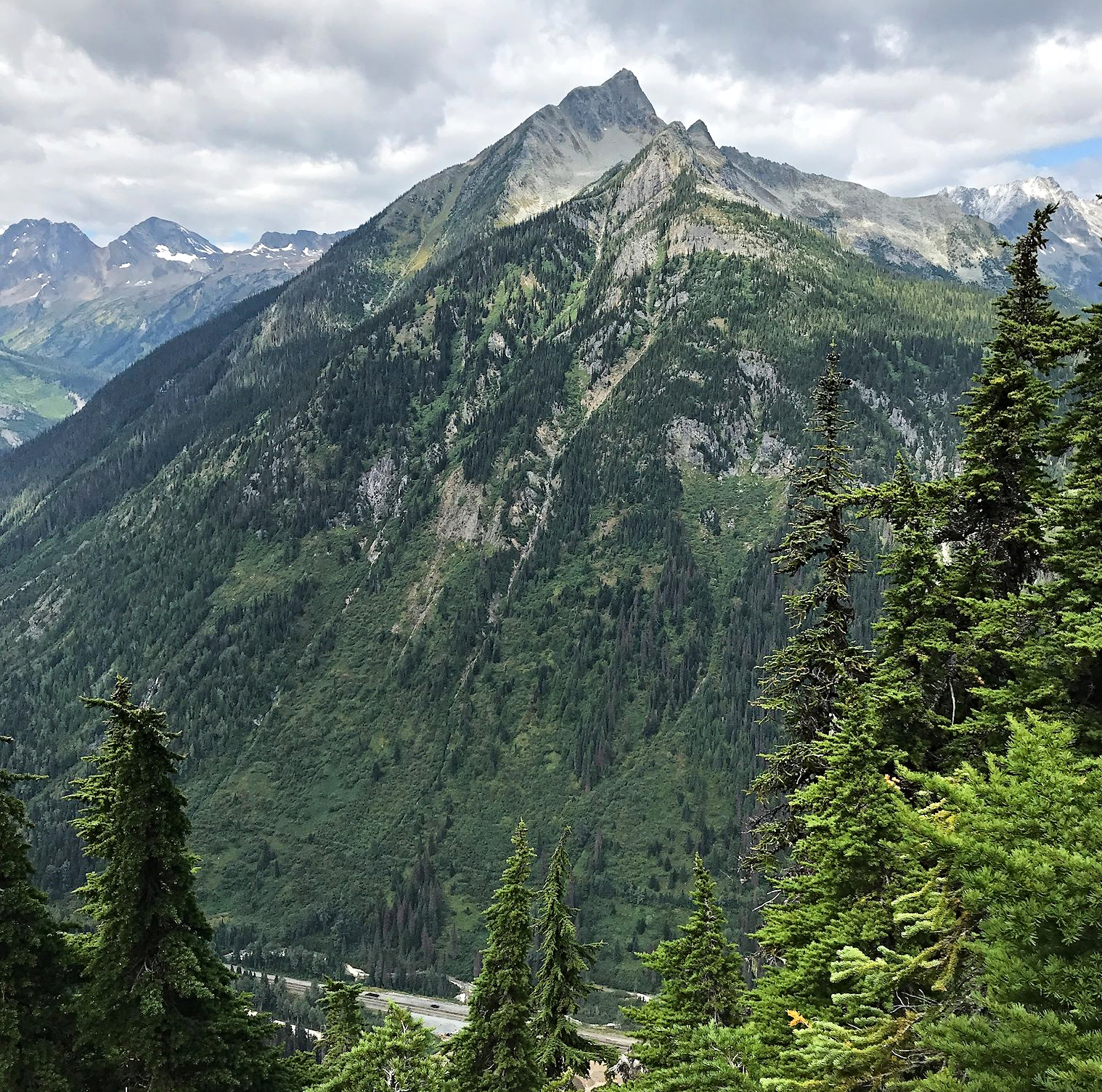
Cheops Mountain

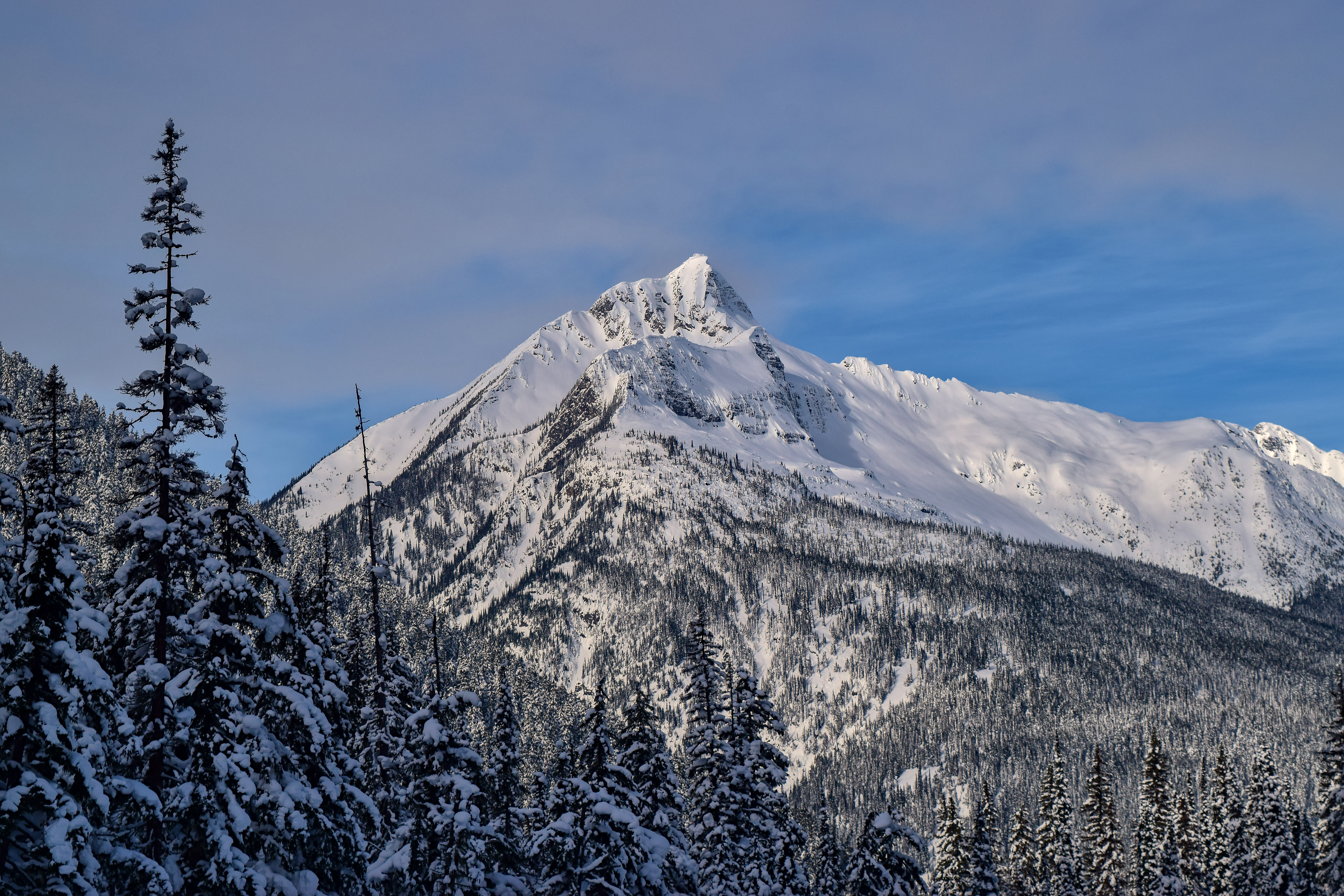
Cheops Mountain seen from the Sir Donald Trail

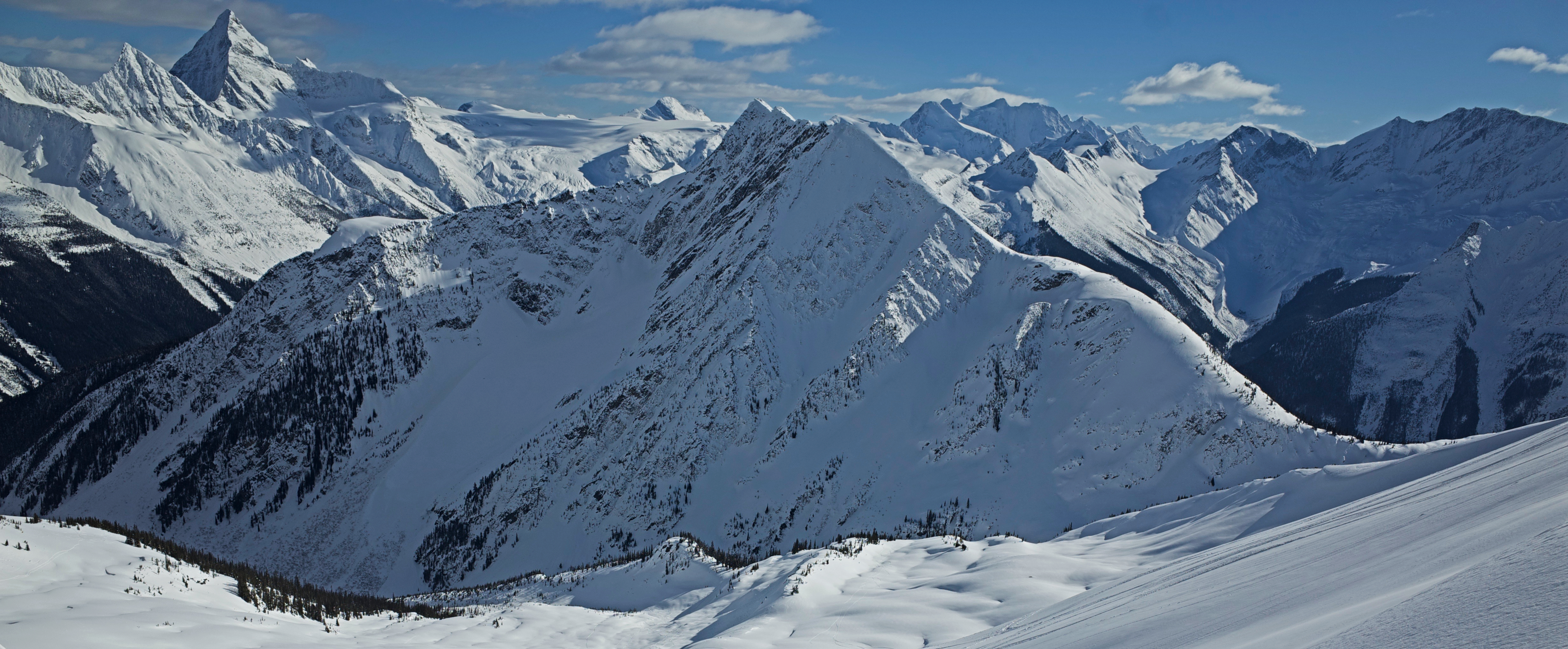
Cheops Mountain

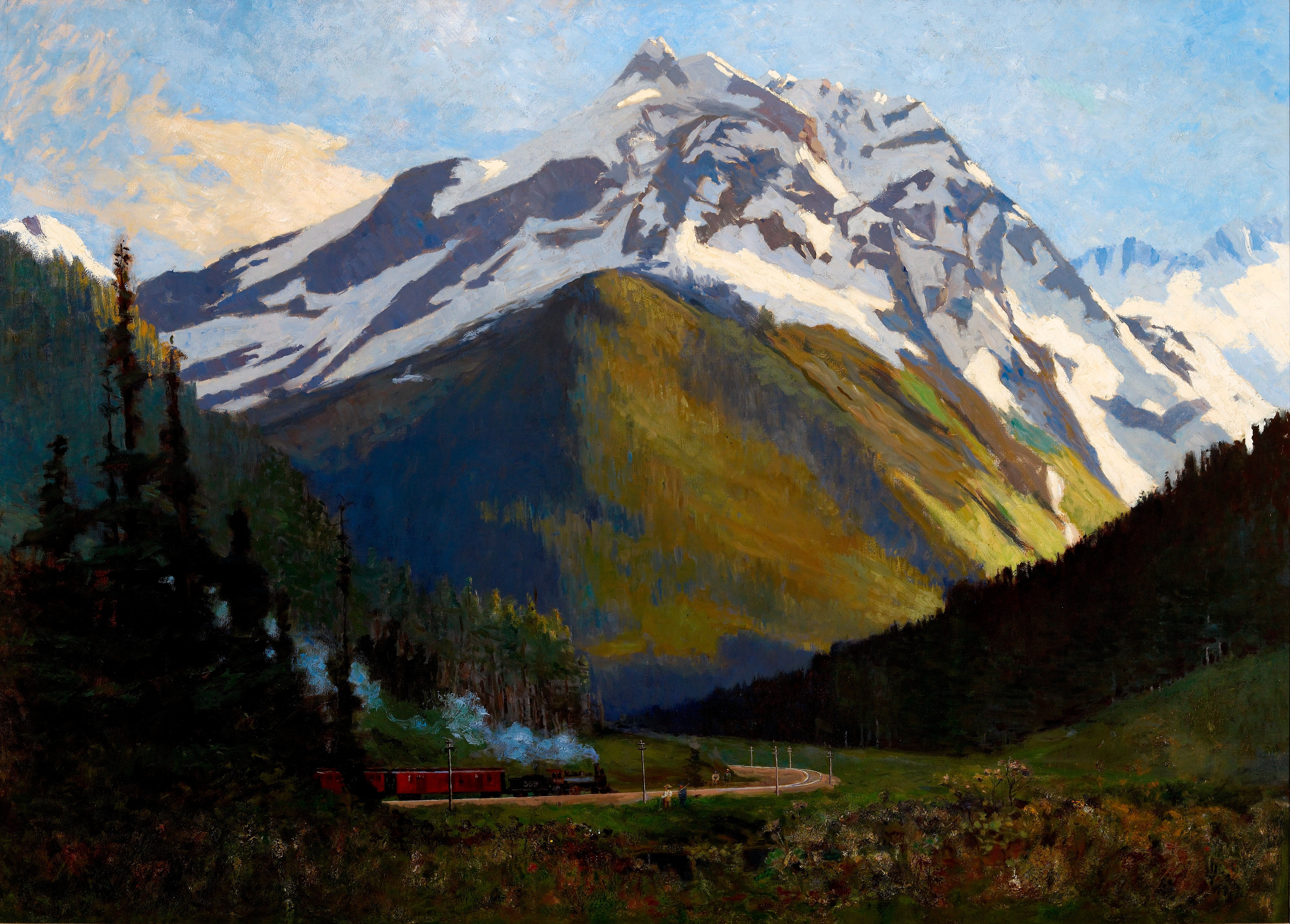
1899 painting of Cheops Mountain by William Brymner

== See also ==
- Geography of British Columbia
