= Illecillewaet River =

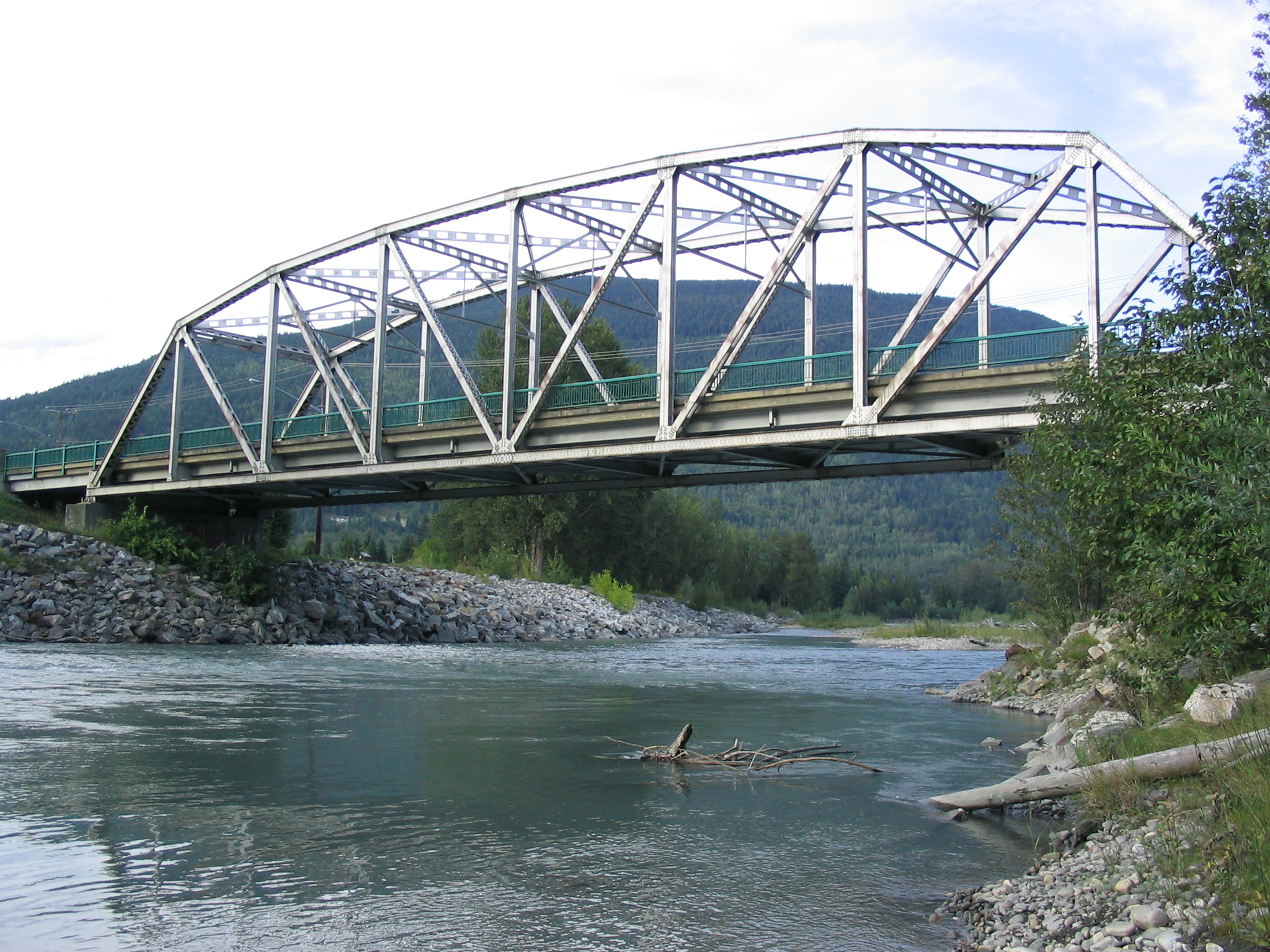
- Illecillewaet River

Location
- Country: Canada
- Province: British Columbia
- District: Kootenay Land District

Physical characteristics
- Source: Illecillewaet Glacier
  - location: Glacier National Park
- Mouth: Columbia River
  - location: Revelstoke
  - coordinates: 50°58′55″N 118°12′25″W
- Length: 62 km (39 mi)
- Basin size: 1,202 km^{2} (464 sq mi)
- Discharge
  - location: near Greeley
  - average: 53.1 m^{3}/s (1,880 cu ft/s)
  - minimum: 3.18 m^{3}/s (112 cu ft/s)
  - maximum: 436 m^{3}/s (15,400 cu ft/s)

The Illecillewaet River /ɪləˈsɪləwət/ is a tributary of the Columbia River located in British Columbia, Canada. Fed by the Illecillewaet Glacier in Glacier National Park, the river flows approximately 62 kilometres (39 mi) to the southwest, where it flows into the north end of Upper Arrow Lake at Revelstoke. The river's drainage basin is 1,202 square kilometres (464 sq mi).

== History ==
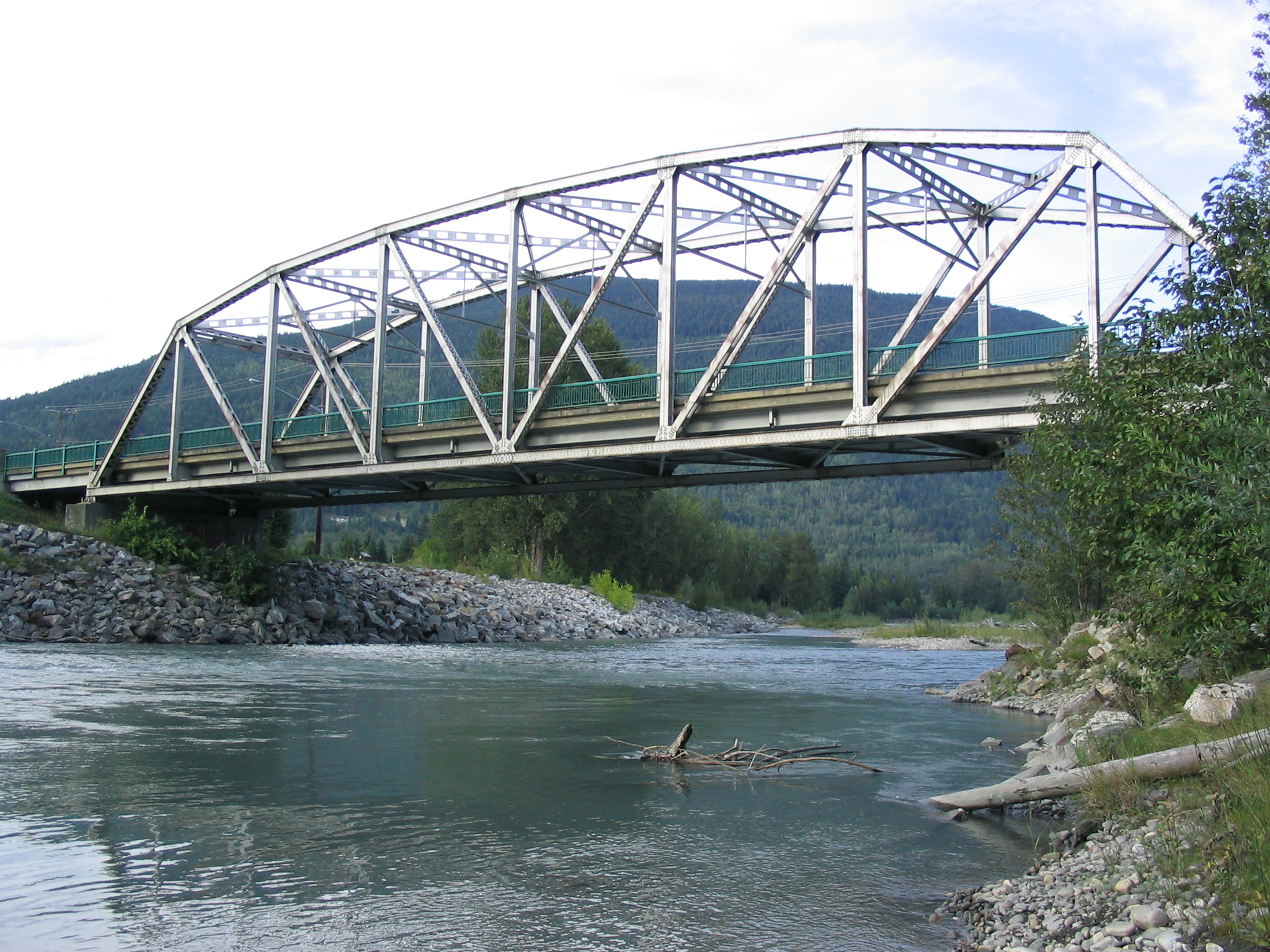
Illecillewaet River Bridge, Revelstoke, BC

The Illecillewaet has been of importance since the discovery in 1881 of an approach along the river to what is now known as the Rogers Pass across the Selkirk Mountains. This pass, discovered by a surveyor for the Canadian Pacific Railway named Albert Bowman Rogers, ultimately became the route through the Selkirks of Canada's first transcontinental railway. In 1962 the Trans-Canada Highway was constructed along the Illecillewaet west of Rogers Pass.

== Natural history ==
The watershed surrounding the river was quickly recognized to be of exceptional ecological significance, and Glacier National Park was established in the area in 1886, followed by Mount Revelstoke National Park in 1914.

== See also ==
- List of rivers of British Columbia
- List of tributaries of the Columbia River
