= Mount Cartier =

Mountain in British Columbia, Canada

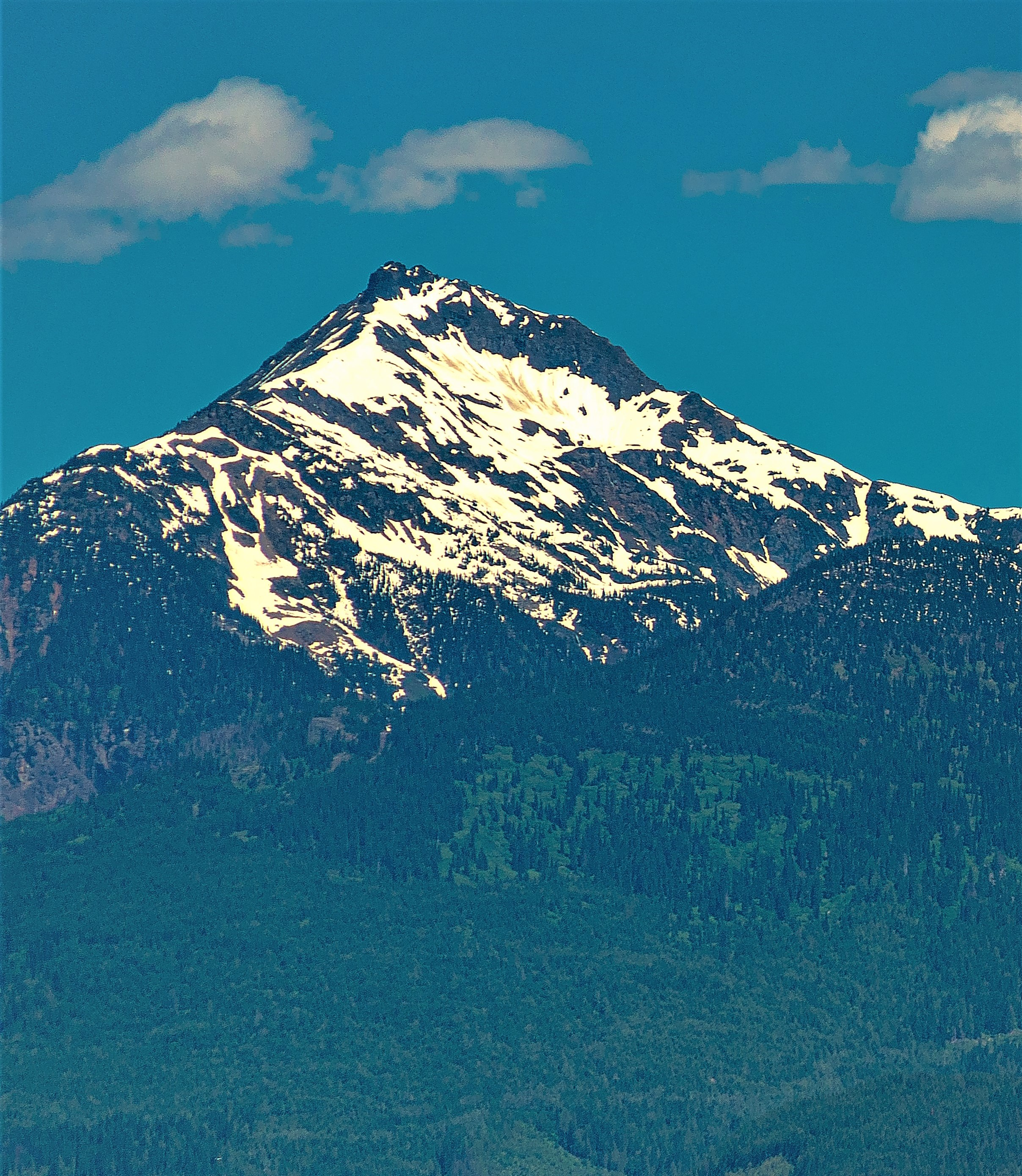
- South aspect

Highest point
- Elevation: 2,610 m (8,563 ft)
- Prominence: 630 m (2,067 ft)
- Parent peak: Albert Peak (3,045 m)
- Isolation: 14.31 km (8.89 mi)
- Listing: Mountains of British Columbia
- Coordinates: 50°54′47″N 118°03′26″W

Naming
- Etymology: George-Étienne Cartier

Geography
- Location within British Columbia Location within Canada
- Interactive map of Mount Cartier
- Country: Canada
- Province: British Columbia
- District: Kootenay Land District
- Parent range: Duncan Ranges ← Selkirk Mountains
- Topo map: NTS 82L16 Revelstoke

Climbing
- First ascent: 1896 by Topographical Survey
- Easiest route: Trail + Scrambling

Mount Cartier is a 2,610-metre (8,563-foot) mountain summit located in British Columbia, Canada.

== Description ==
Mount Cartier is part of the Duncan Ranges which is a subrange of the Selkirk Mountains. The peak is situated 13 km (8.1 mi) southeast of Revelstoke and 14.3 km (8.9 mi) east of Mount Begbie which is the nearest higher neighbor. Nearby peaks include Mount Mackenzie 6.1 km (3.8 mi) to the north-northwest and Ghost Peak, 3.1 km (1.9 mi) northeast. Precipitation runoff from the mountain drains west to Arrow Lakes which is a reservoir of the Columbia River. Mount Cartier is more notable for its steep rise above local terrain than for its absolute elevation as topographic relief is significant with the summit rising 2,174 meters (7,133 ft) above Upper Arrow Lake in 5 km (3.1 mi). From the lake, a 15-kilometer trail leads to a fire lookout and the upper slopes. The trail and lookout were constructed in the early 1920s, and while the lookout still stands, it hasn't been used for fire detection since the 1930s. The mountain trail is also a helibiking destination with helicopters lifting mountain bikers to a helipad below the summit.

== Etymology ==
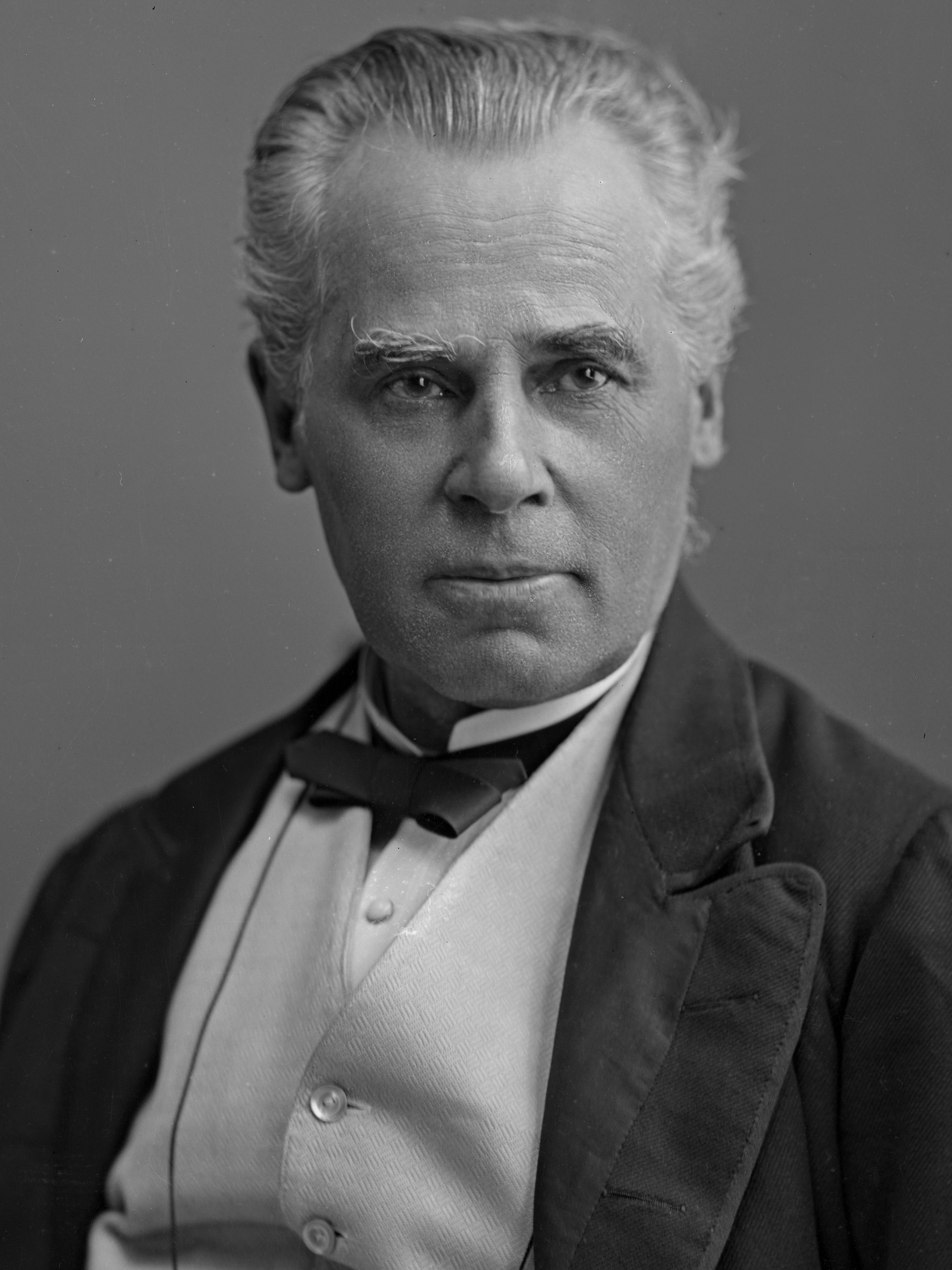
Cartier

The mountain is named after Sir George-Étienne Cartier (1814–1873), Prime Minister of Canada (1858–62). He was born at Antoine, Quebec; served as attorney general for Lower Canada (1856); and as joint Prime Minister with Sir John A. Macdonald. He was a strong advocate for Confederation and expansion in the west. The mountain's toponym was officially adopted September 30, 1932, by the Geographical Names Board of Canada, although this toponym had appeared in publications as early as 1887, if not earlier.

== Climate ==
Based on the Köppen climate classification, Mount Cartier is located in a subarctic climate zone with cold, snowy winters, and mild summers. Winter temperatures can drop below −20 °C with wind chill factors below −30 °C. This climate supports a ski resort 5 km (3.1 mi) to the north.

== Gallery ==
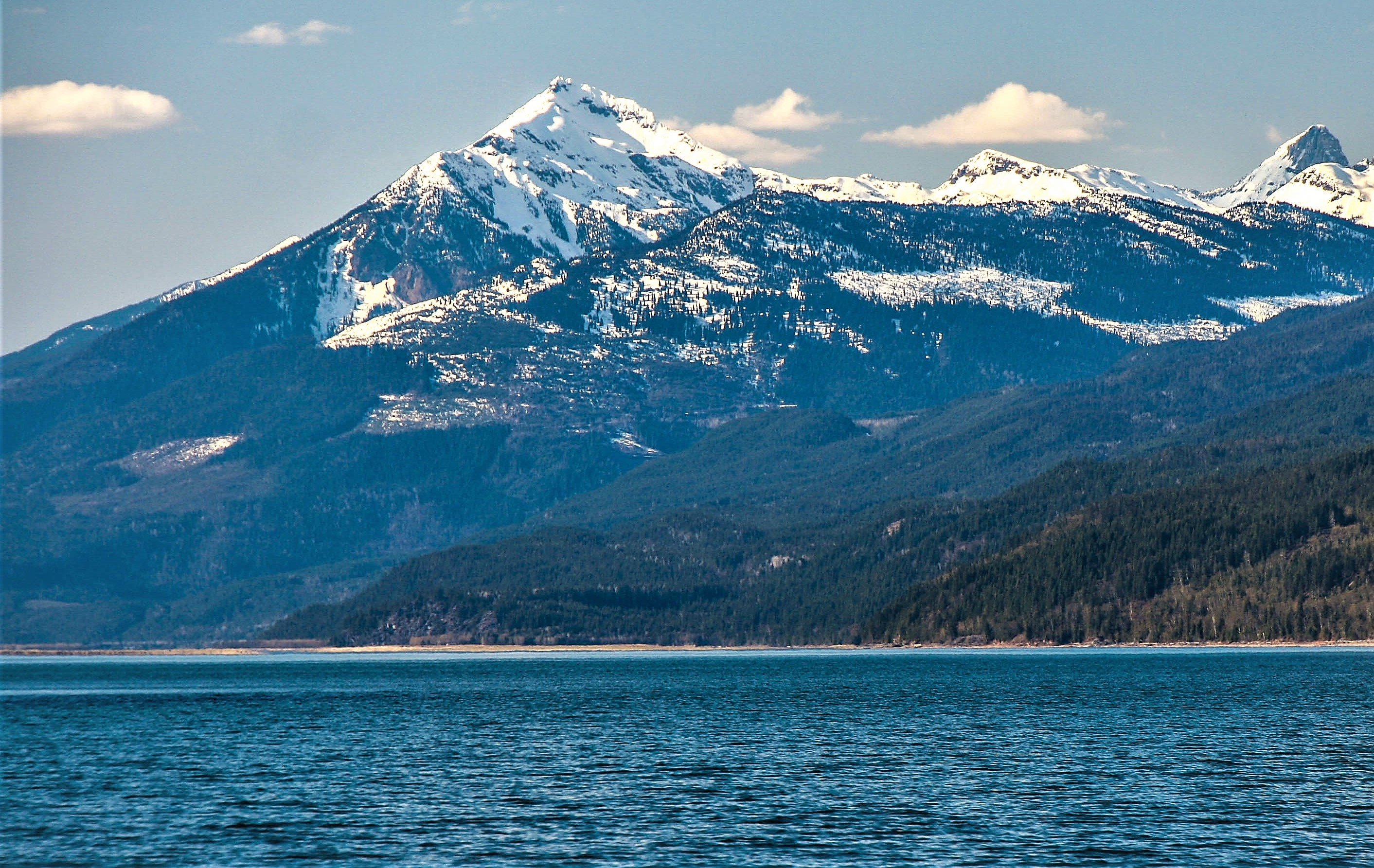
South aspect of Mount Cartier, from Upper Arrow Lake.

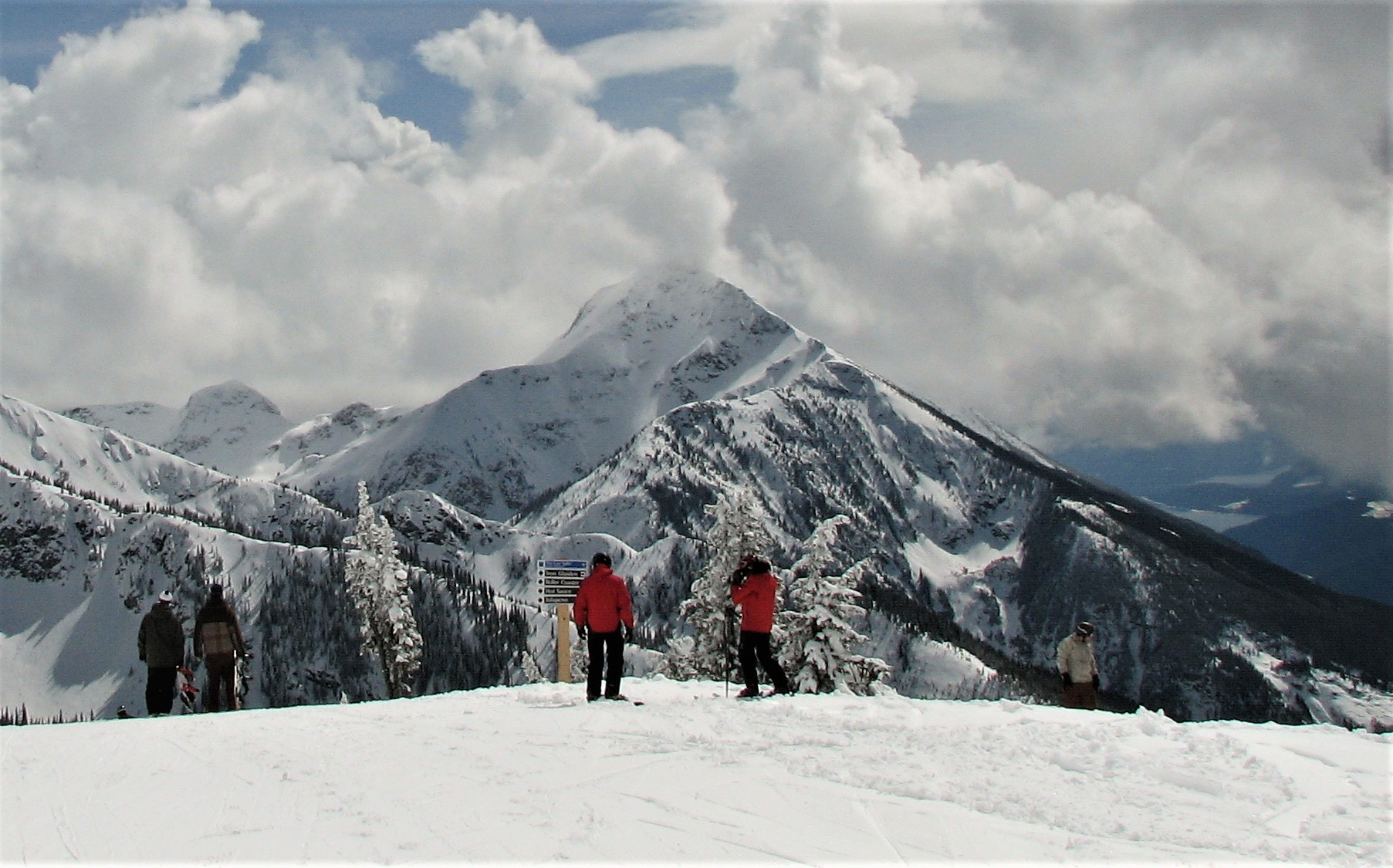
North aspect of Mount Cartier seen from Revelstoke ski slopes

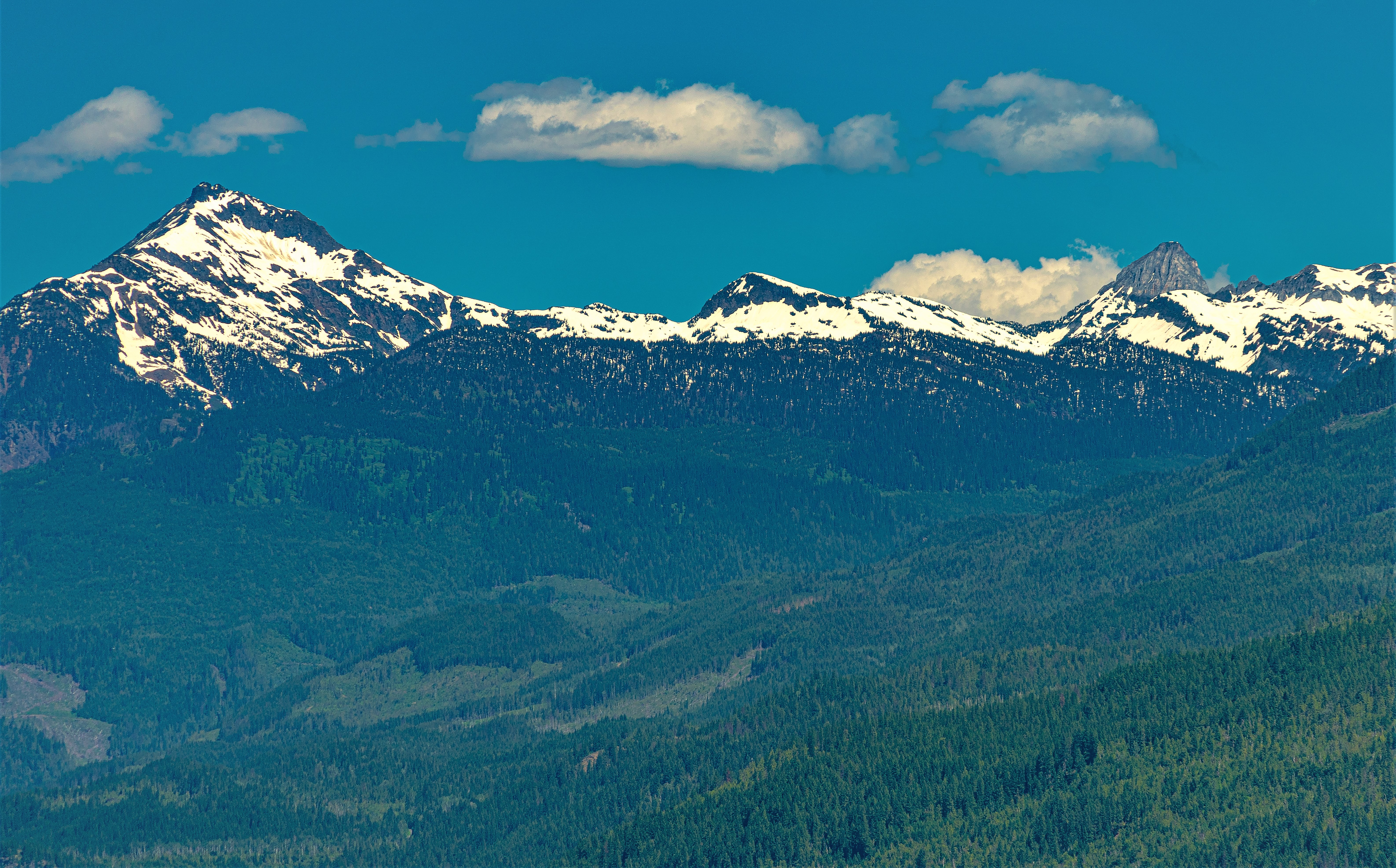
Mt. Cartier (left), Ghost Peak (right)

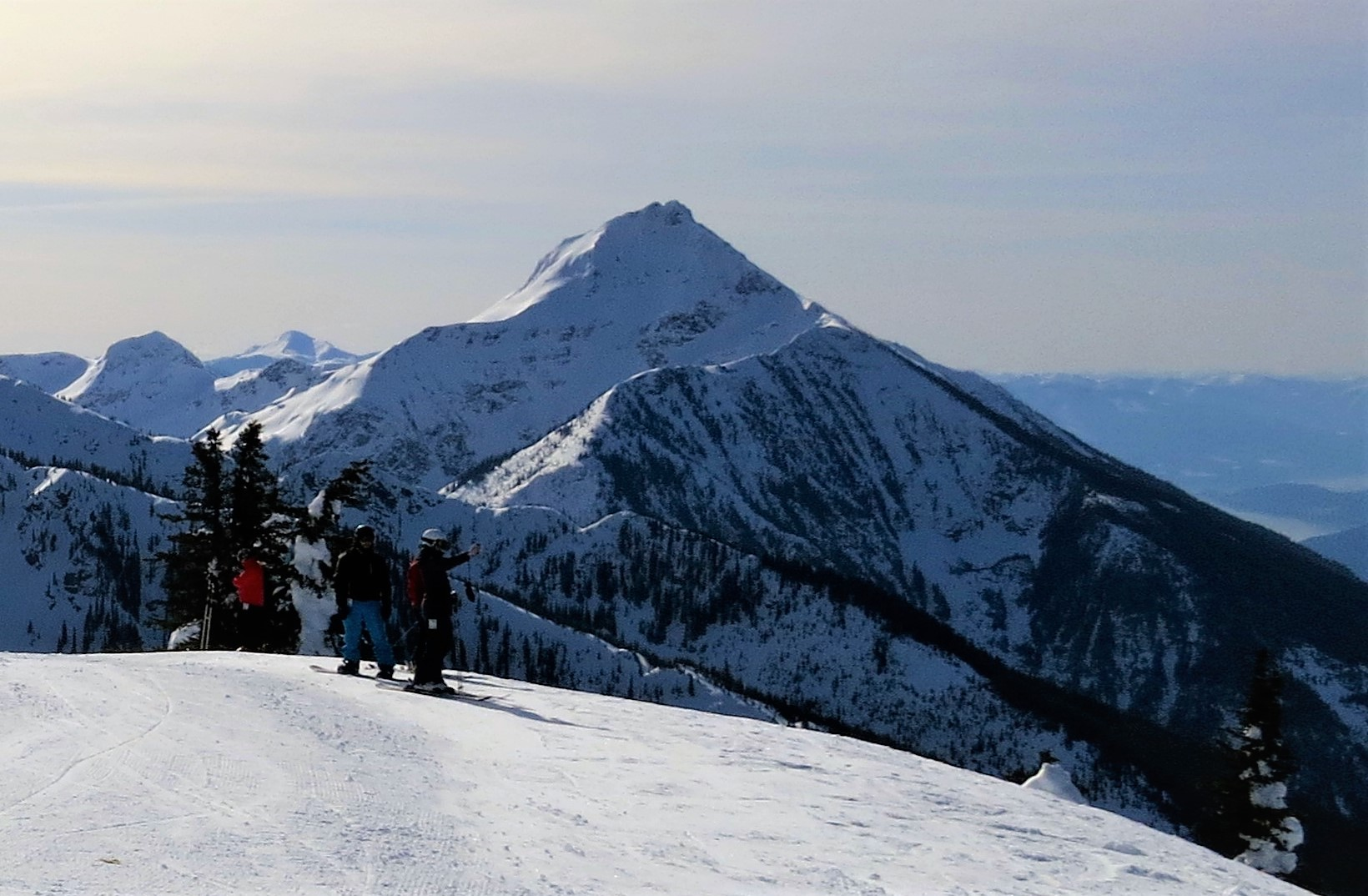
North aspect of Mount Cartier seen from Revelstoke Mountain Resort

== See also ==
- Geography of British Columbia
