= Mount Topham =

Mountain in British Columbia, Canada

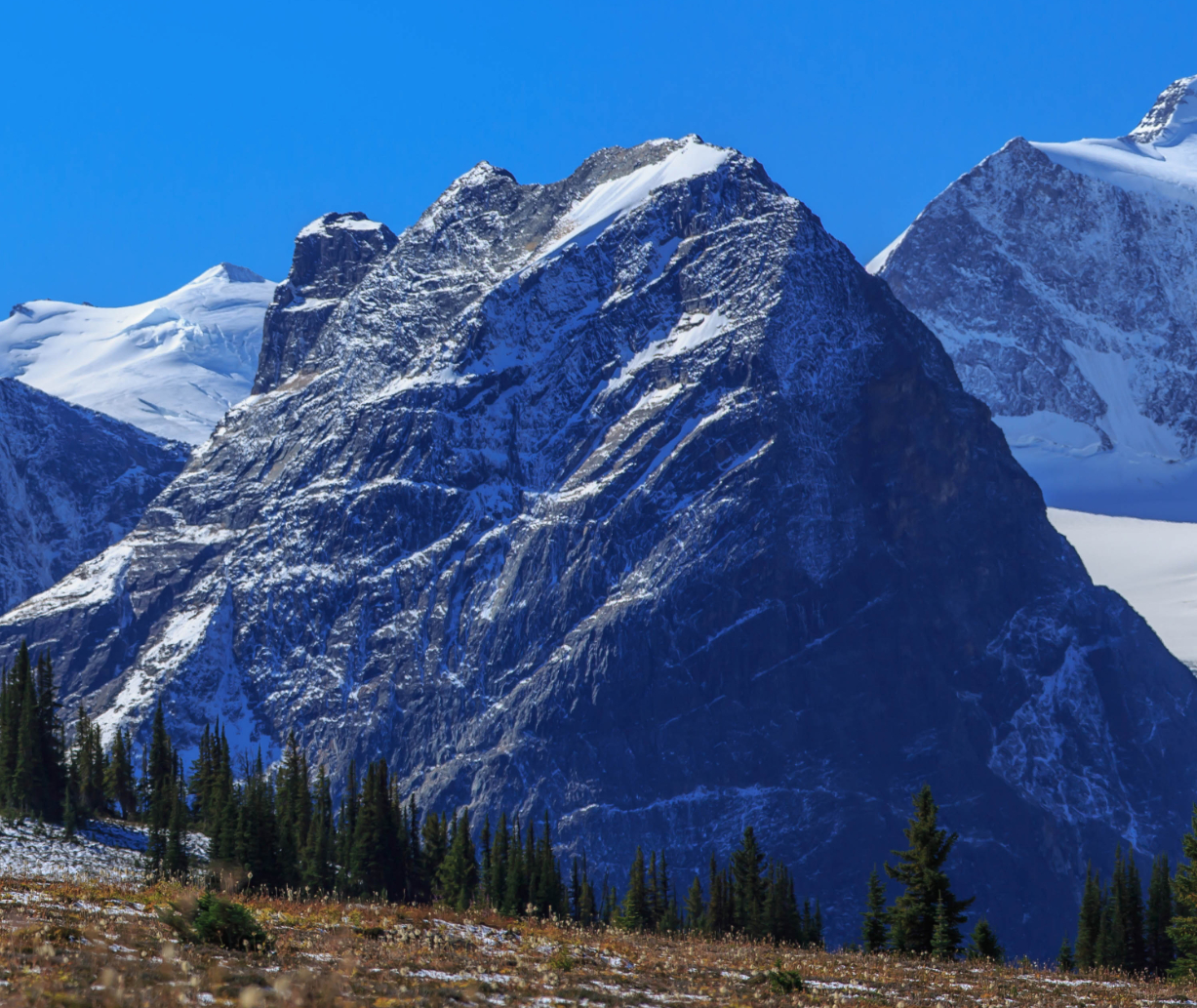
- Mount Topham, north aspect

Highest point
- Elevation: 2,872 m (9,423 ft)
- Prominence: 250 m (820 ft)
- Parent peak: Mount Dawson (3377 m)
- Listing: Mountains of British Columbia
- Coordinates: 51°09′25″N 117°21′33″W

Geography
- Location within British Columbia Location within Canada
- Country: Canada
- Province: British Columbia
- District: Kootenay Land District
- Protected area: Glacier National Park
- Parent range: Duncan Ranges ← Selkirk Mountains
- Topo map: NTS 82N3 Mount Wheeler

Mount Topham, is a 2,872-metre (9,423-foot) mountain summit located in Glacier National Park of British Columbia, Canada. It is part of the Selkirk Mountains range. The mountain is a remote 60 km (37 mi) east of Revelstoke, and 32 km (20 mi) southwest of Golden. Its nearest higher peak is Mount Selwyn, 2.66 km (1.65 mi) to the west. Mount Topham is situated along the western edge of the Deville Glacier. Precipitation runoff from the mountain drains into the Beaver River. Mount Topham was named in 1902 by Arthur Oliver Wheeler to honor Harold Ward Topham (1857–1915), an English mountaineer who explored and mapped the Selkirks. The mountain's name was officially adopted September 8, 1932, by the Geographical Names Board of Canada. Based on the Köppen climate classification, Mount Topham is located in a subarctic climate zone with cold, snowy winters, and mild summers. Winter temperatures can drop below −20 °C with wind chill factors below −30 °C.

== Gallery ==
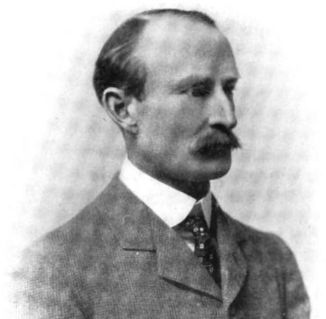
Harold Ward Topham

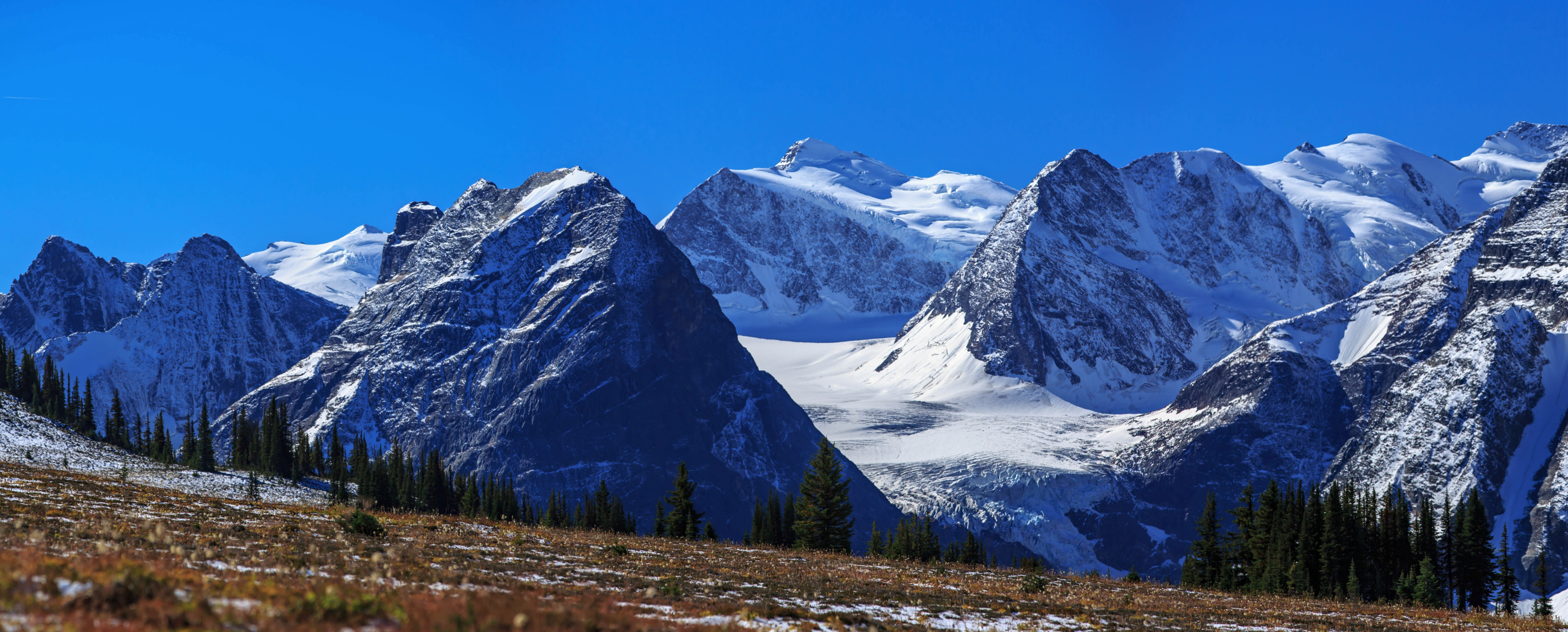
Mount Topham and Mount Wheeler from north

== See also ==
- Geography of British Columbia
