= Terminal Peak (Canada) =

Mountain in the country of Canada

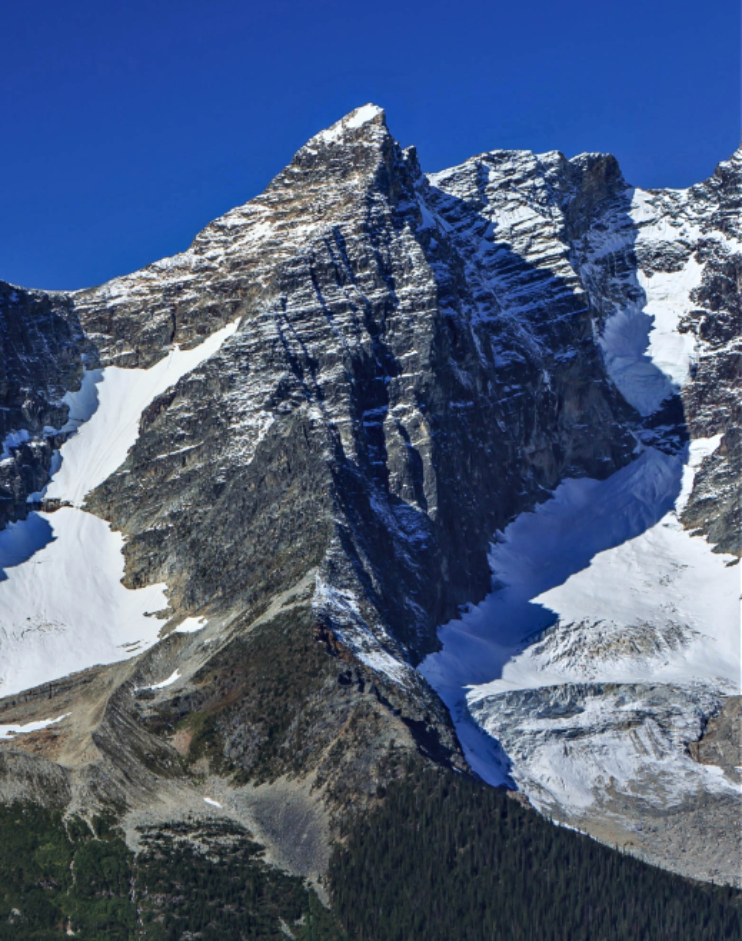
- Terminal Peak, east face, with Sir Donald Glacier to right

Highest point
- Elevation: 2,997 m (9,833 ft)
- Prominence: 104 m (341 ft)
- Parent peak: Mount Sir Donald (3284 m)
- Listing: Mountains of British Columbia
- Coordinates: 51°15′14″N 117°25′11″W

Geography
- Location within British Columbia Location within Canada
- Location: Glacier National Park; British Columbia, Canada
- Country: Canada
- Province: British Columbia
- District: Kootenay Land District
- Protected area: Glacier National Park
- Parent range: Duncan Ranges ← Selkirk Mountains
- Topo map: NTS 82N6 Blaeberry

Climbing
- First ascent: 1906 Allan F. Kitchell, Cornelius P. Kitchell, Edward Feuz Jr.

Terminal Peak is a 2,997-metre (9,833-foot) mountain summit located in Glacier National Park of British Columbia, Canada. As part of the Selkirk Mountains, it is situated at the south end of the compact Sir Donald Range, hence the name origin. The mountain is a remote 62 km (39 mi) northeast of Revelstoke, and 32 km (20 mi) west of Golden. The nearest higher peak is Mount Sir Donald, 1.33 km (0.83 mi) to the immediate northwest, and Mount Macoun rises 7.14 km (4.44 mi) to the south. The expansive Illecillewaet Névé lies to the southwest, the Sir Donald Glacier lies below the steep northeast wall, and a small unnamed glacier lies at the bottom of the steep southeast slope. Precipitation runoff from the mountain and meltwater from the glaciers drains west into the Illecillewaet River, and east into the Beaver River.

== History ==
The first ascent of the peak was made in 1906 by Allan F. Kitchell, Cornelius P. Kitchell, and Edward Feuz Jr. The mountain's toponym was officially adopted December 31, 1924, by the Geographical Names Board of Canada.

== Climate ==
Based on the Köppen climate classification, Terminal Peak is located in a subarctic climate zone with cold, snowy winters, and mild summers. Winter temperatures can drop below −20 °C with wind chill factors below −30 °C.

== Gallery ==
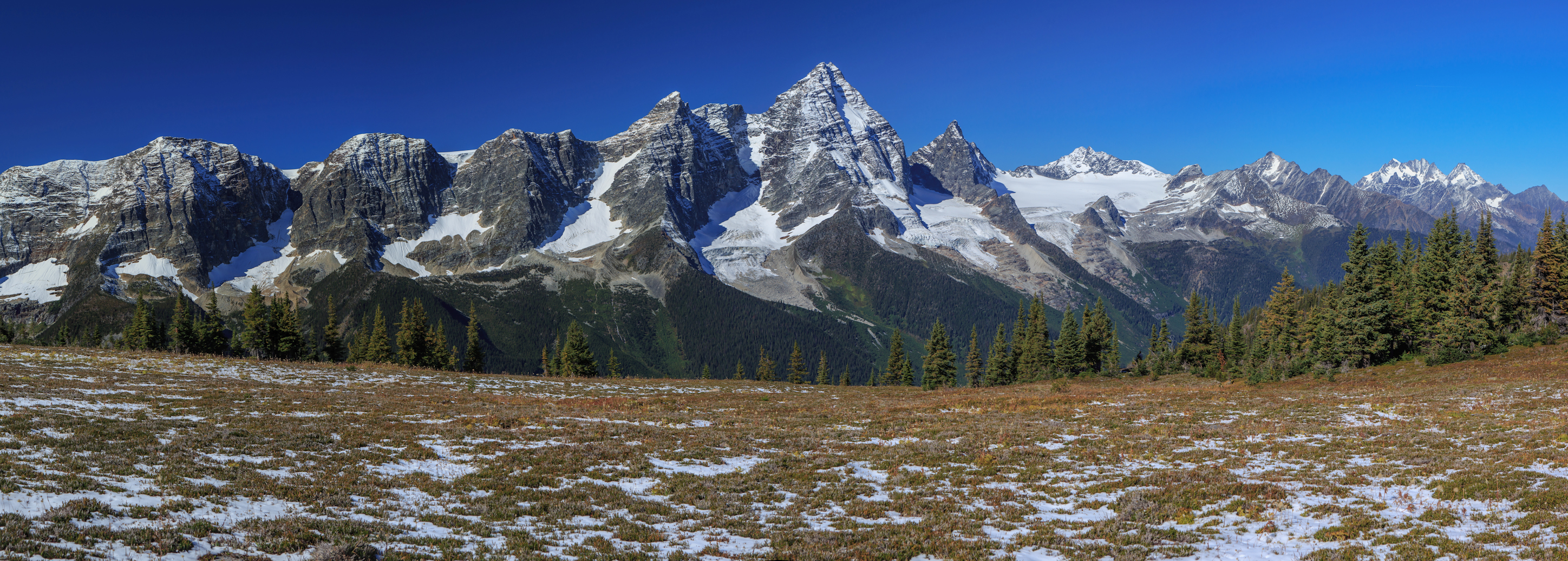
Mount Sir Donald centered with Terminal Peak to immediate left

== See also ==
- Geography of British Columbia
