= Mount Macoun =

Mountain in British Columbia, Canada

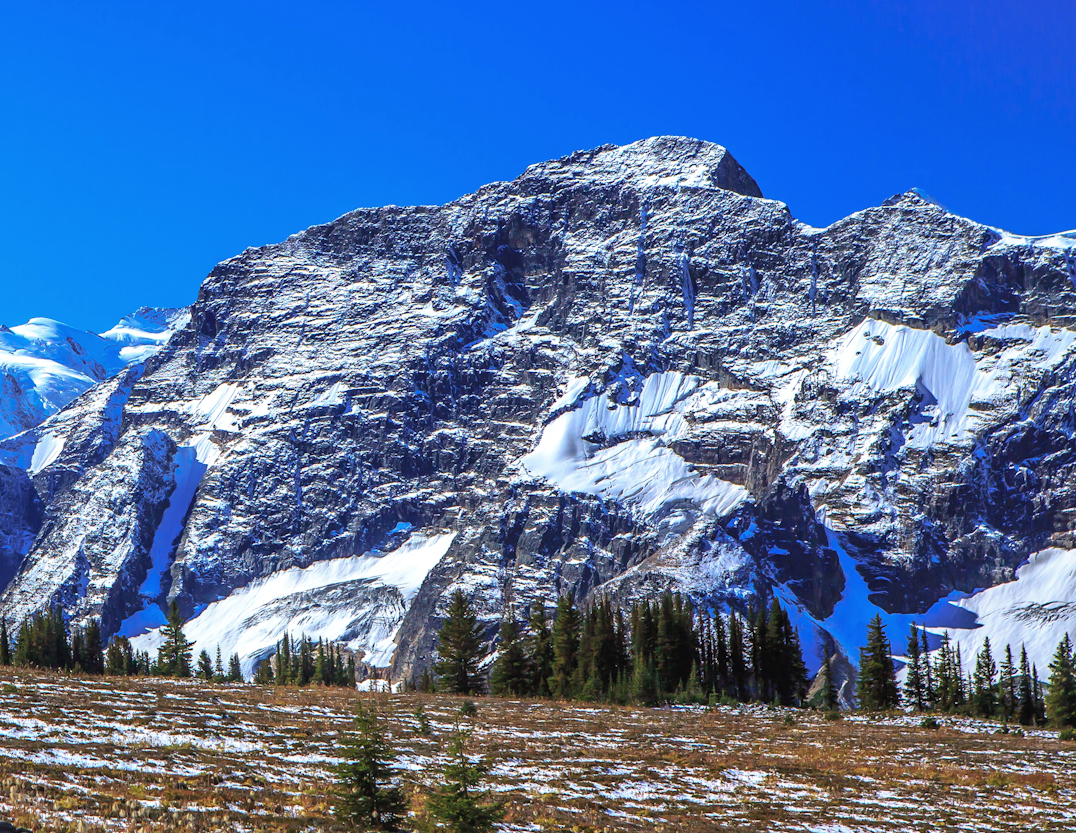
- Mount Macoun, east face

Highest point
- Elevation: 3,030 m (9,940 ft)
- Prominence: 485 m (1,591 ft)
- Parent peak: Mount Sir Donald (3284 m)
- Listing: Mountains of British Columbia
- Coordinates: 51°11′37″N 117°23′01″W

Geography
- Location within British Columbia Location within Canada
- Location: Glacier National Park; British Columbia, Canada
- District: Kootenay Land District
- Parent range: Duncan Ranges ← Selkirk Mountains
- Topo map: NTS 82N3 Mount Wheeler

Climbing
- First ascent: 1902

Mount Macoun is a 3,030-metre (9,940-foot) mountain summit located in Glacier National Park of British Columbia, Canada. It is part of the Selkirk Mountains range. The mountain is a remote 61 km (38 mi) east of Revelstoke, and 32 km (20 mi) southwest of Golden. Its nearest higher peak is Mount Fox, 3.7 km (2.3 mi) to the southwest, and Mount Topham rises 4.4 km (2.7 mi) to the south. The expansive Illecillewaet Névé lies to the northwest, and two small unnamed glaciers lie at the bottom of the steep east face. Precipitation runoff from the mountain drains into the Beaver River.

== Climate ==
Based on the Köppen climate classification, Mount Macoun is located in a subarctic climate zone with cold, snowy winters, and mild summers. Winter temperatures can drop below −20 °C with wind chill factors below −30 °C. The months July through September offer the most favorable weather for viewing and climbing Mount Macoun.

== History ==
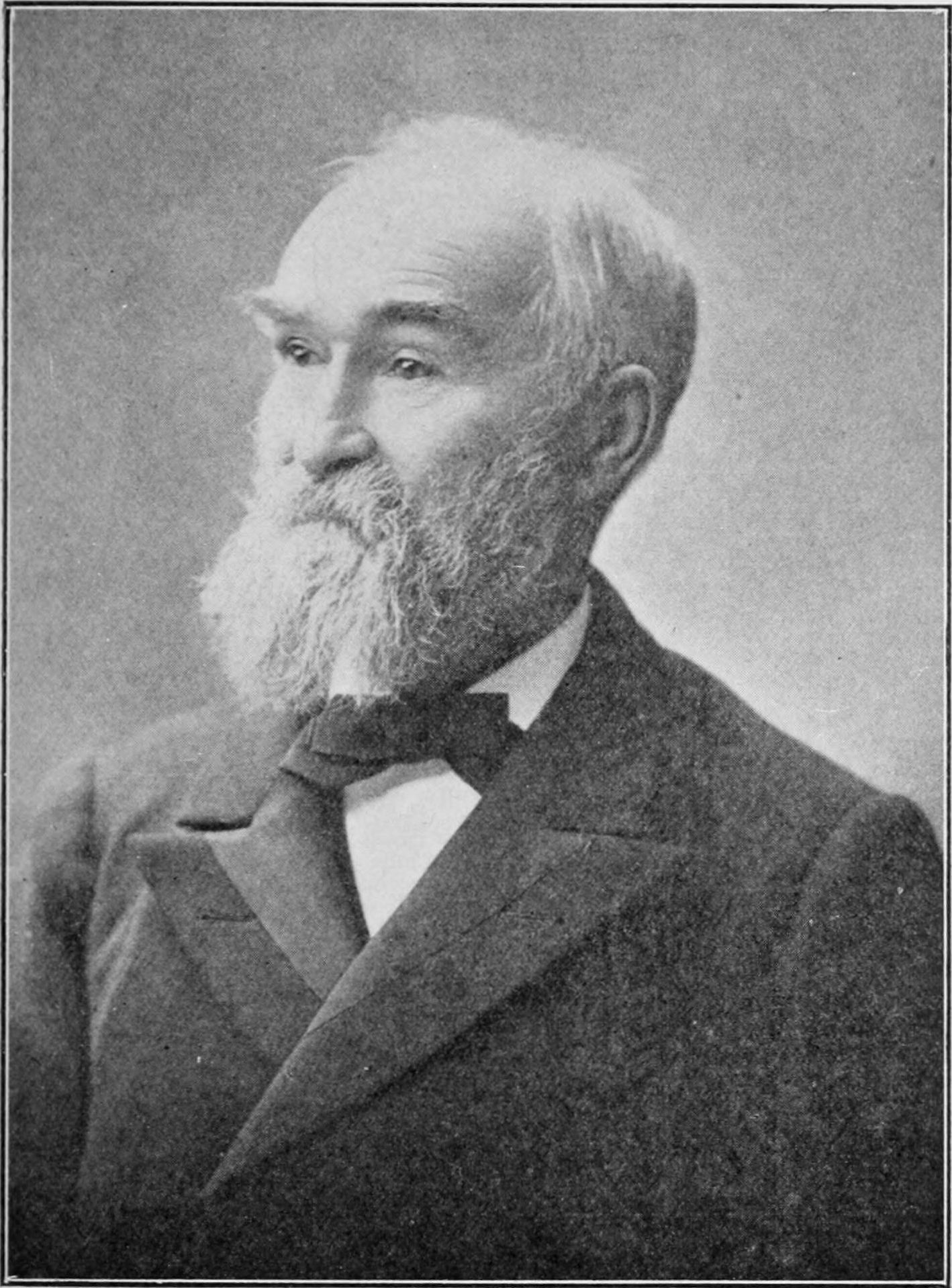
John Macoun

Mount Macoun was named in 1888 by mountaineers Reverend William S. Green and Rev. Henry Swanzy to honor John Macoun (1831-1920), a Canadian botanist and naturalist with the Geological Survey of Canada. The mountain's name was officially adopted September 8, 1932, by the Geographical Names Board of Canada. The first ascent of the peak was made in August 1902 by Rev. J. C. Herdman with guide Edouard Feuz, Sr.

== See also ==
- Geography of British Columbia
