= Mount Selwyn =

Mountain in British Columbia, Canada

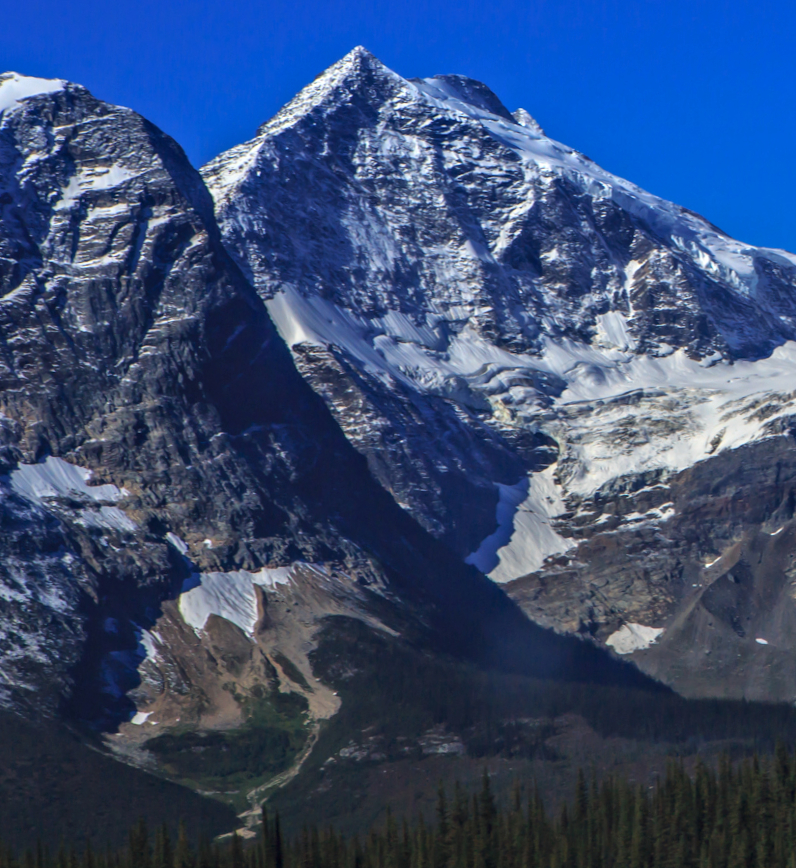
- Mount Selwyn, northeast aspect

Highest point
- Elevation: 3,335 m (10,942 ft)
- Prominence: 125 m (410 ft)
- Parent peak: Mount Dawson (3377 m)
- Listing: Mountains of British Columbia
- Coordinates: 51°09′11″N 117°24′25″W

Geography
- Location within British Columbia Location within Canada
- Country: Canada
- Province: British Columbia
- District: Kootenay Land District
- Protected area: Glacier National Park
- Parent range: Duncan Ranges ← Selkirk Mountains
- Topo map: NTS 82N3 Mount Wheeler

Climbing
- First ascent: 1890 Harold E Forster, Harold W Topham, Harry Sinclair, Samuel Yves

There is also a mountain near Williston Lake in British Columbia named "Mount Selwyn."

Mount Selwyn, is a 3,335-metre (10,942-foot) mountain summit located in Glacier National Park of British Columbia, Canada. It is part of the Selkirk Mountains range. The mountain is situated 60 km (37 mi) east-northeast of Revelstoke, and 35 km (22 mi) southwest of Golden. Its nearest higher peak is Mount Dawson, 1 km (0.62 mi) to the west. Originally named Deville in 1888 by mountaineer Rev. William S. Green, Mount Selwyn was renamed to honor Alfred Richard Cecil Selwyn (1824-1902), director of the Geological Survey of Canada, and President of the Royal Society of Canada. The mountain's name was officially adopted September 8, 1932, by the Geographical Names Board of Canada. The first ascent of the mountain was made in 1890 by Harold E. Forster, Harold Ward Topham, Harry Sinclair, and Samuel Yves.

== Climate ==
Based on the Köppen climate classification, Mount Selwyn is located in a subarctic climate zone with cold, snowy winters, and mild summers. Temperatures can drop below −20 °C with wind chill factors below −30 °C. This climate supports an intensely glaciated area around the mountain including the Fox Glacier on the north aspect, The Bishops Glacier on the south, the Deville Névé to the southeast, and the Deville Glacier to the east. Precipitation runoff from the mountain drains into the Beaver River.

== See also ==
- Geography of British Columbia
