= North Albert Peak =

Mountain in British Columbia, Canada

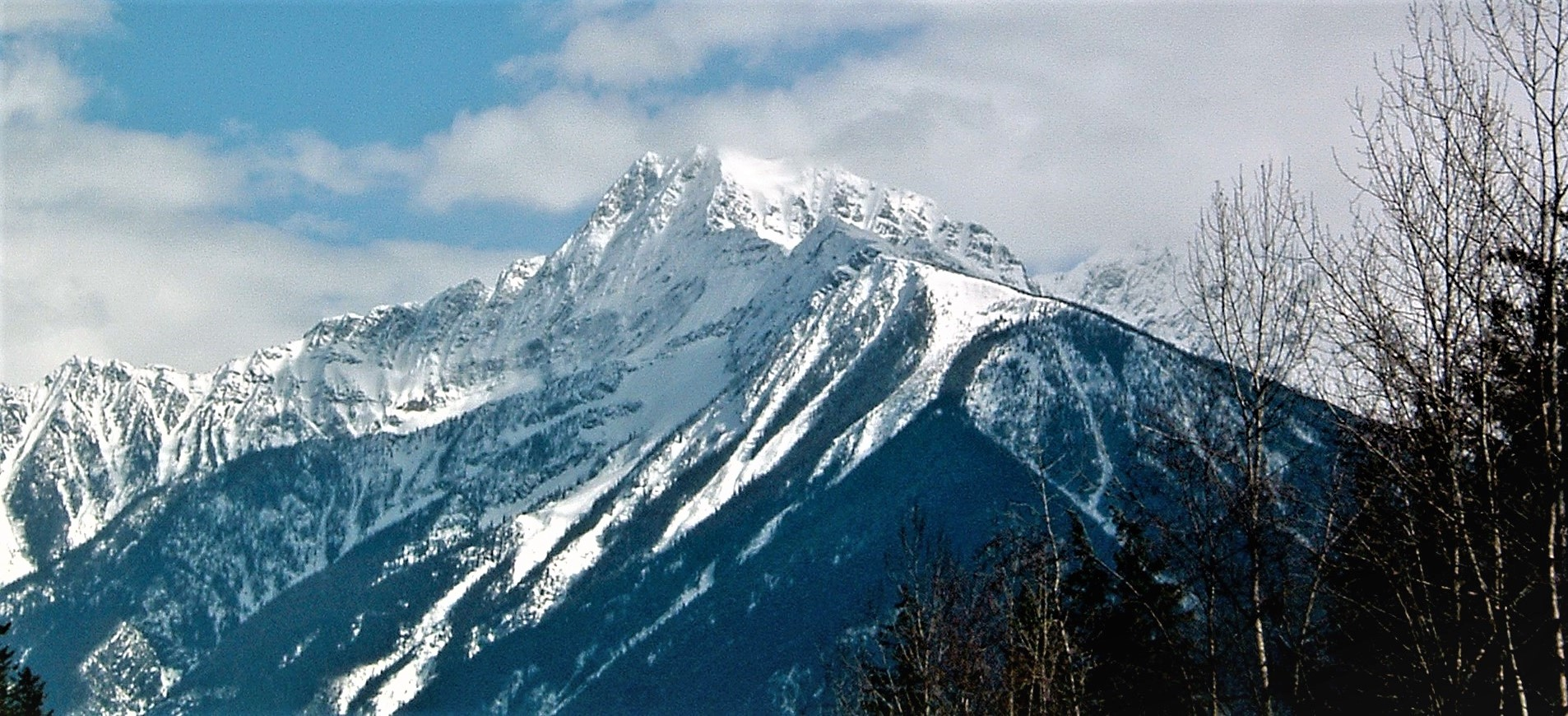
- West aspect viewed from Highway 1

Highest point
- Elevation: 2,934 m (9,626 ft)
- Prominence: 252 m (827 ft)
- Parent peak: Albert Peak (3,045 m)
- Isolation: 2.1 km (1.3 mi)
- Listing: Mountains of British Columbia
- Coordinates: 51°02′54″N 117°52′31″W

Naming
- Etymology: Albert Luther Rogers

Geography
- Location within British Columbia Location within Canada
- Interactive map of North Albert Peak
- Location: Illecillewaet Valley
- Country: Canada
- Province: British Columbia
- District: Kootenay Land District
- Parent range: Duncan Ranges ← Selkirk Mountains
- Topo map: NTS 82N4 Illecillewaet

Climbing
- First ascent: 1909

North Albert Peak is a 2,934-metre (9,626-foot) mountain summit located in British Columbia, Canada.

== Description ==
Part of the Selkirk Mountains, the mountain is situated 22 km (14 mi) east of Revelstoke, 4 km (2.5 mi) southeast of Mount Revelstoke National Park and 12 km (7.5 mi) southwest of Glacier National Park. The nearest higher neighbor is Albert Peak, 2 km (1.2 mi) to the immediate southeast. Precipitation runoff from the mountain drains into tributaries of the nearby Illecillewaet River. North Albert Peak is more notable for its steep rise above local terrain than for its absolute elevation. Topographic relief is significant as the summit rises over 2,350 meters (7,710 ft) above the Illecillewaet Valley in 4 km (2.5 mi). The peak is visible from Highway 1 (the Trans-Canada Highway) between Revelstoke and Rogers Pass.

== History ==
The first ascent of the summit was made in 1909 by W. A. Alldritt and G. L. Haggen.

The landform was named after Albert Luther Rogers (1859–1929), the nephew of Major A. B. Rogers, and his assistant while exploring this area 1881–82 for a Canadian Pacific Railway route through the Selkirk and Rocky Mountains. Albert Rogers was born June 19, 1859, in Waterville, Minnesota, and died May 16, 1929, in Waterville, Washington. He was a civil engineer, civic leader and merchant in Waterville, as well as regent for the University of Washington (1909–1913). The mountain's toponym was officially adopted September 8, 1932, by the Geographical Names Board of Canada.

== Climate ==
Based on the Köppen climate classification, North Albert Peak is located in a subarctic climate zone with cold, snowy winters, and mild summers. Winter temperatures can drop below −20 °C with wind chill factors below −30 °C.

== Gallery ==
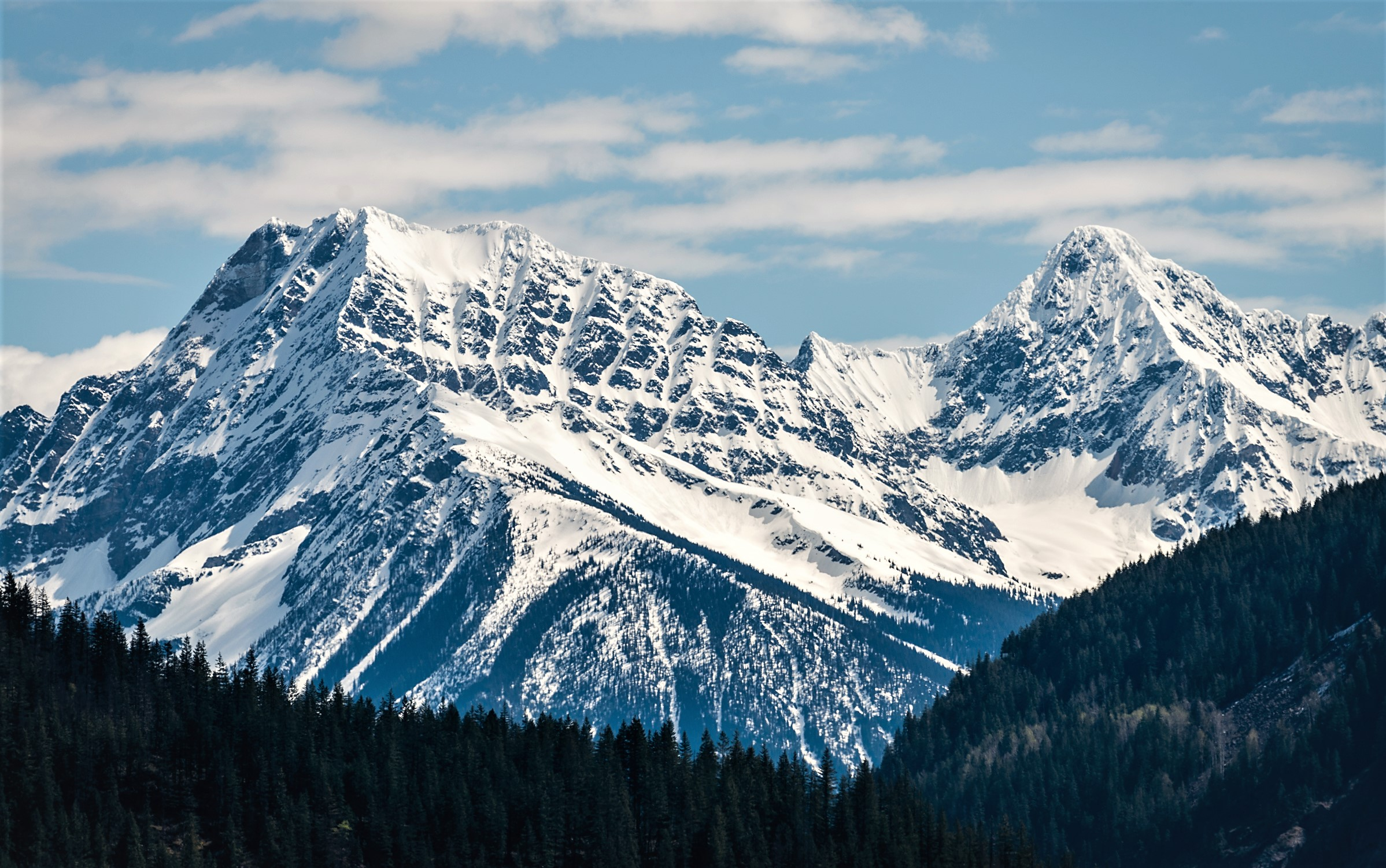
The Albert Peaks. North Albert Peak (left) and Albert Peak

== See also ==
- Geography of British Columbia
