= Badshot Range =

Mountain range in British Columbia, Canada

- Location within British Columbia

Highest point
- Peak: Mount Templeman
- Elevation: 3,074 m (10,085 ft)
- Coordinates: 50°41′23″N 117°12′18″W

Dimensions
- Area: 1,537 km^{2} (593 mi^{2})

Geography
- Country: Canada
- Province: British Columbia
- Range coordinates: 50°39′59″N 117°20′04″W
- Parent range: Duncan Ranges

The Badshot Range is a subrange of the Duncan Ranges of the Selkirk Mountains of the Columbia Mountains in southeastern British Columbia, Canada, located west of Duncan Lake and Westfall River east of Trout Lake.

Peaks of this range include:

Mountain/Peak	metres	feet
Mount Templeman	3,074	10,085
Mount Abbot Peak	2,961	9,715
Mount Pool	2,868	9,409
Mount Jowett	2,865	9,400
Mount Hillman	2,861	9,386
Spine Mountain	2,851	9,354
Similarity Mountain	2,848	9,344
Fays Peak	2,826	9,272
Razors Edge	2,815	9,236
Goat Tower	2,815	9,236
