= Ghost Peak (Canada) =

Mountain in British Columbia, Canada

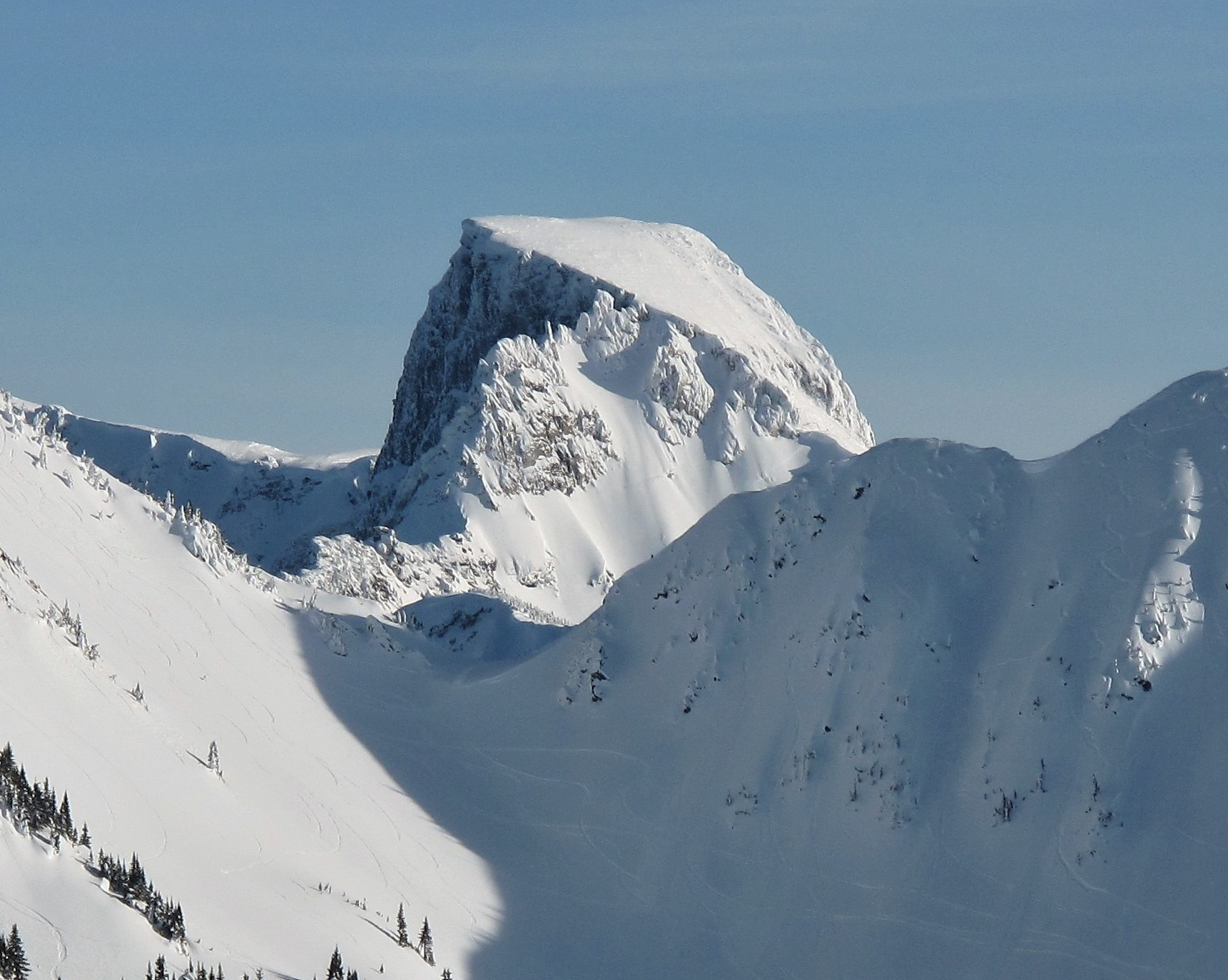
- West aspect

Highest point
- Elevation: 2,500 m (8,202 ft)
- Prominence: 404 m (1,325 ft)
- Parent peak: Mount Cartier (2,610 m)
- Isolation: 2.95 km (1.83 mi)
- Listing: Mountains of British Columbia
- Coordinates: 50°55′48″N 118°01′41″W

Geography
- Location within British Columbia Location within Canada
- Interactive map of Ghost Peak
- Country: Canada
- Province: British Columbia
- District: Kootenay Land District
- Parent range: Duncan Ranges ← Selkirk Mountains
- Topo map: NTS 82L16 Revelstoke

Ghost Peak is a 2,500-metre (8,202-foot) mountain summit located in British Columbia, Canada.

== Description ==
Part of the Selkirk Mountains, Ghost Peak is situated 14 km (8.7 mi) southeast of Revelstoke and 3.1 km (1.9 mi) northeast of Mount Cartier, the nearest higher neighbor. Precipitation runoff from the mountain drains west to Arrow Lakes and north to the nearby Illecillewaet River via Greeley Creek. Ghost Peak is more notable for its steep rise above local terrain than for its absolute elevation. Topographic relief is significant as the summit rises 2,063 meters (6,770 ft) above Upper Arrow Lake in 7 km (4.3 mi). The mountain's toponym was officially adopted September 7, 1950, by the Geographical Names Board of Canada.

== Climate ==
Based on the Köppen climate classification, Ghost Peak is located in a subarctic climate zone with cold, snowy winters, and mild summers. Winter temperatures can drop below −20 °C with wind chill factors below −30 °C.

== Gallery ==
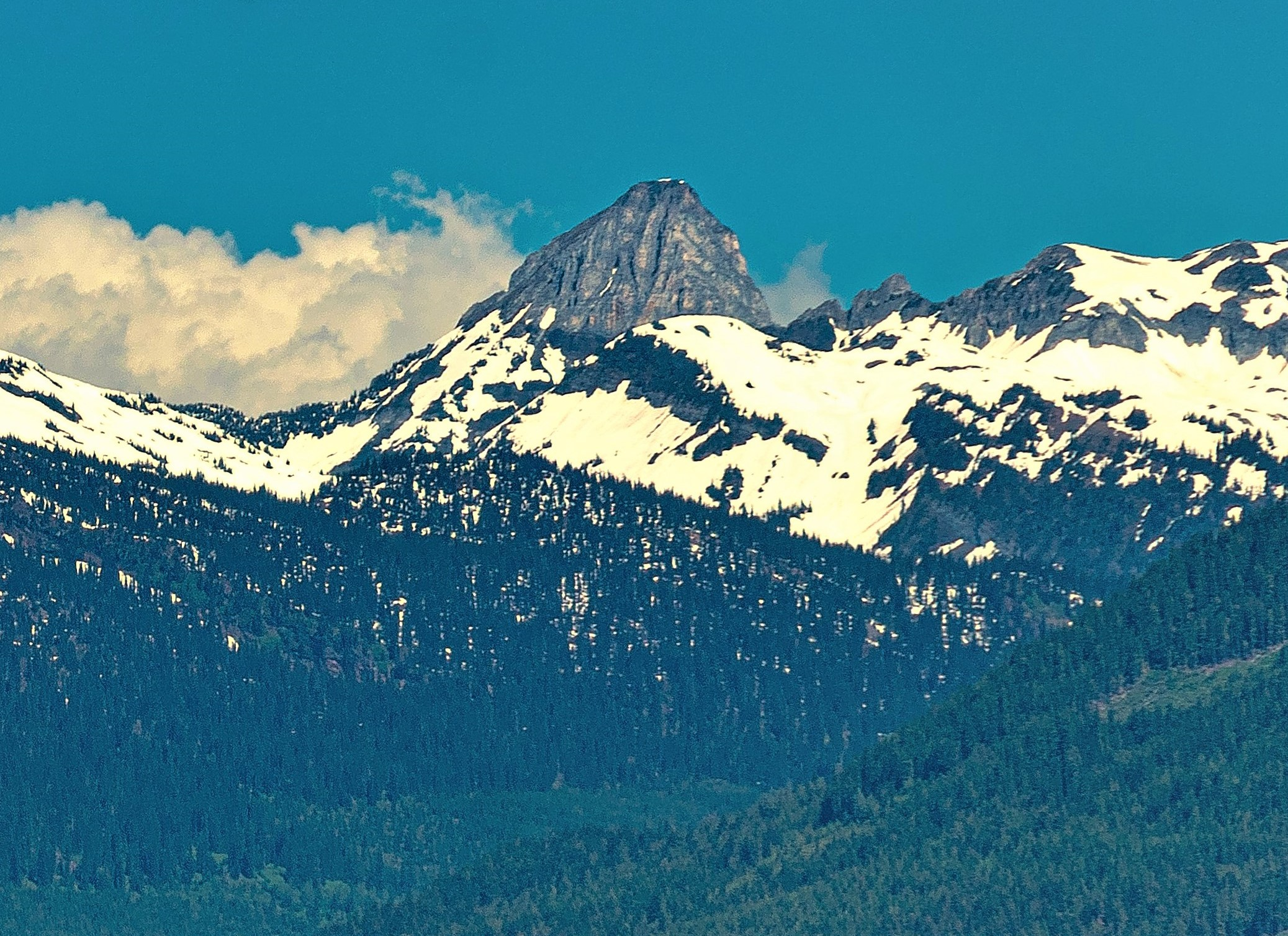
South aspect of Ghost Peak seen from Upper Arrow Lake

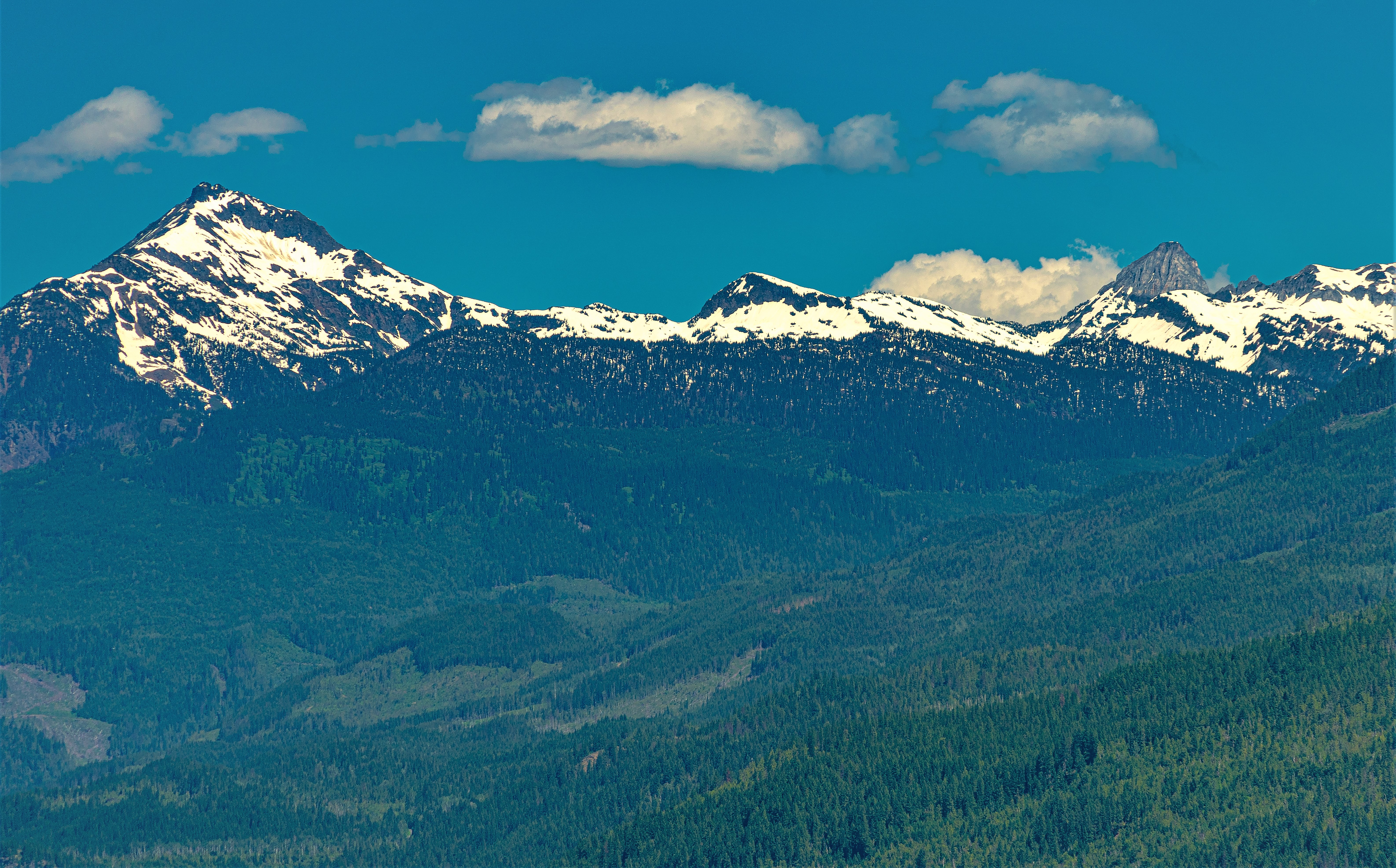
Ghost Peak (right) and parent Mt. Cartier (left)

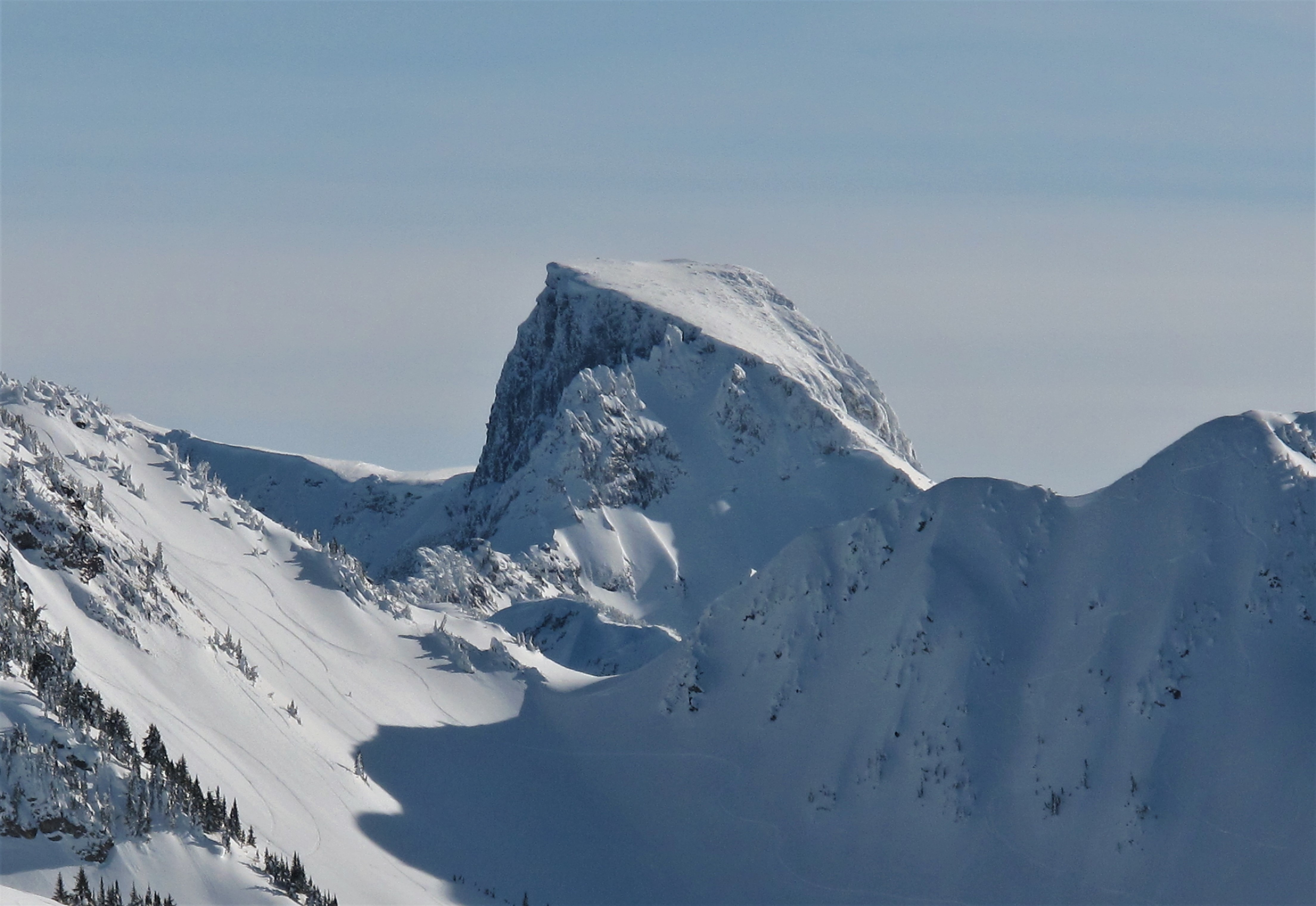
Ghost Peak seen from Revelstoke Mountain Resort

== See also ==
- Geography of British Columbia
