= Mount Mackenzie =

Mountain southeast of Revelstoke, British Columbia, Canada

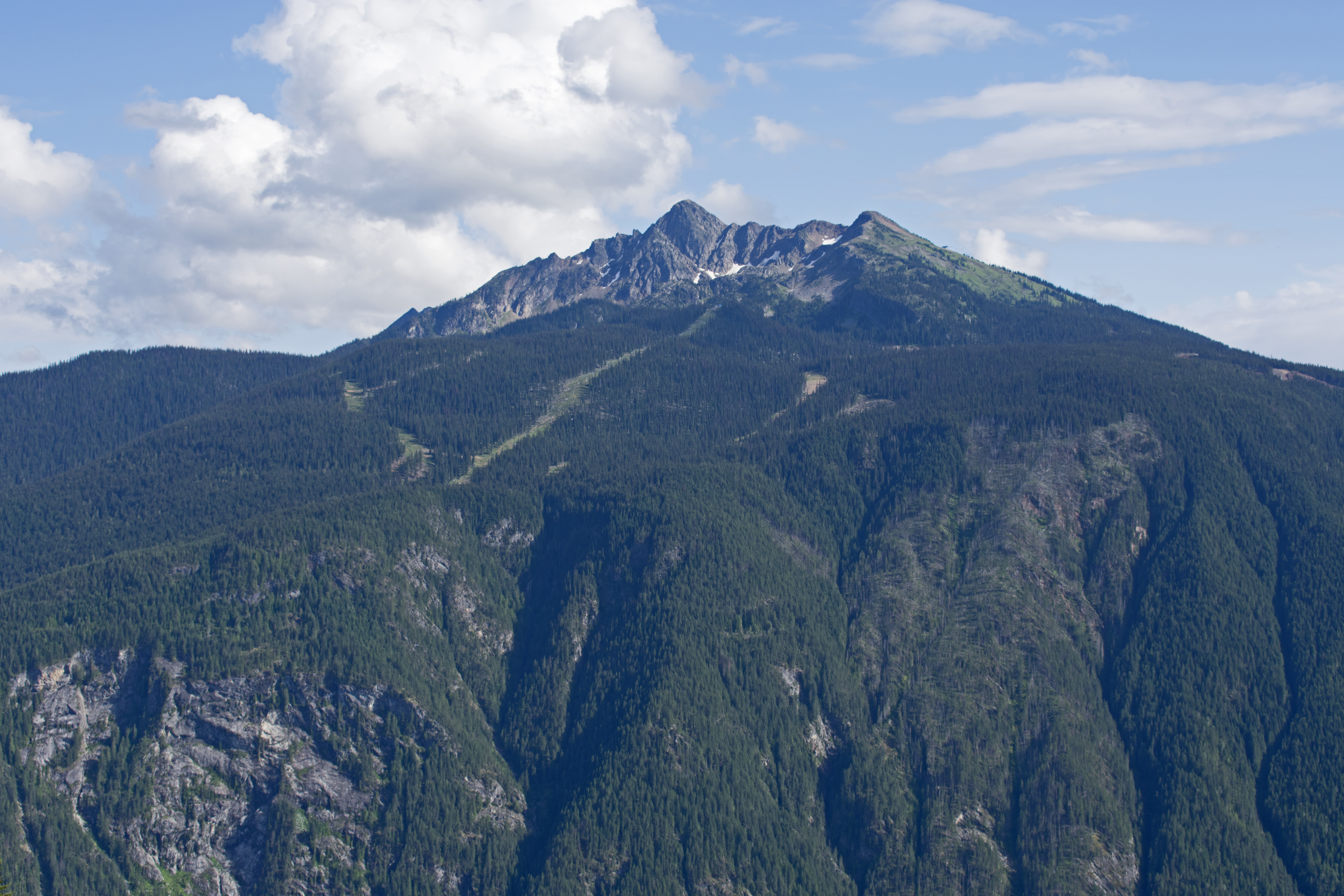
- Mount Mackenzie viewed from Mount Revelstoke National Park

Highest point
- Elevation: 2,461 m (8,074 ft)
- Prominence: 431 m (1,414 ft)
- Parent peak: Ghost Peak (2500 m)
- Listing: Mountains of British Columbia
- Coordinates: 50°57′49″N 118°05′21″W

Geography
- Location within British Columbia
- Interactive map of Mount Mackenzie
- Country: Canada
- Province: British Columbia
- District: Kootenay Land District
- Parent range: Duncan Ranges ← Selkirk Mountains
- Topo map: NTS 82L16 Revelstoke

Climbing
- First ascent: Unknown

Mount Mackenzie is a 2,461-metre (8,074 ft) mountain southeast of the city of Revelstoke, British Columbia, Canada. Part of the Selkirk Mountains, it is the site of the Revelstoke Mountain Resort ski area and was named for the Right Honourable Sir Alexander Mackenzie, the second Prime Minister of Canada.

== Climate ==
Based on the Köppen climate classification, Mount Mackenzie is located in a subarctic climate zone with cold, snowy winters and mild summers. Winter temperatures can drop below −20 °C, with wind chill factors reaching below −30 °C.

== Gallery ==
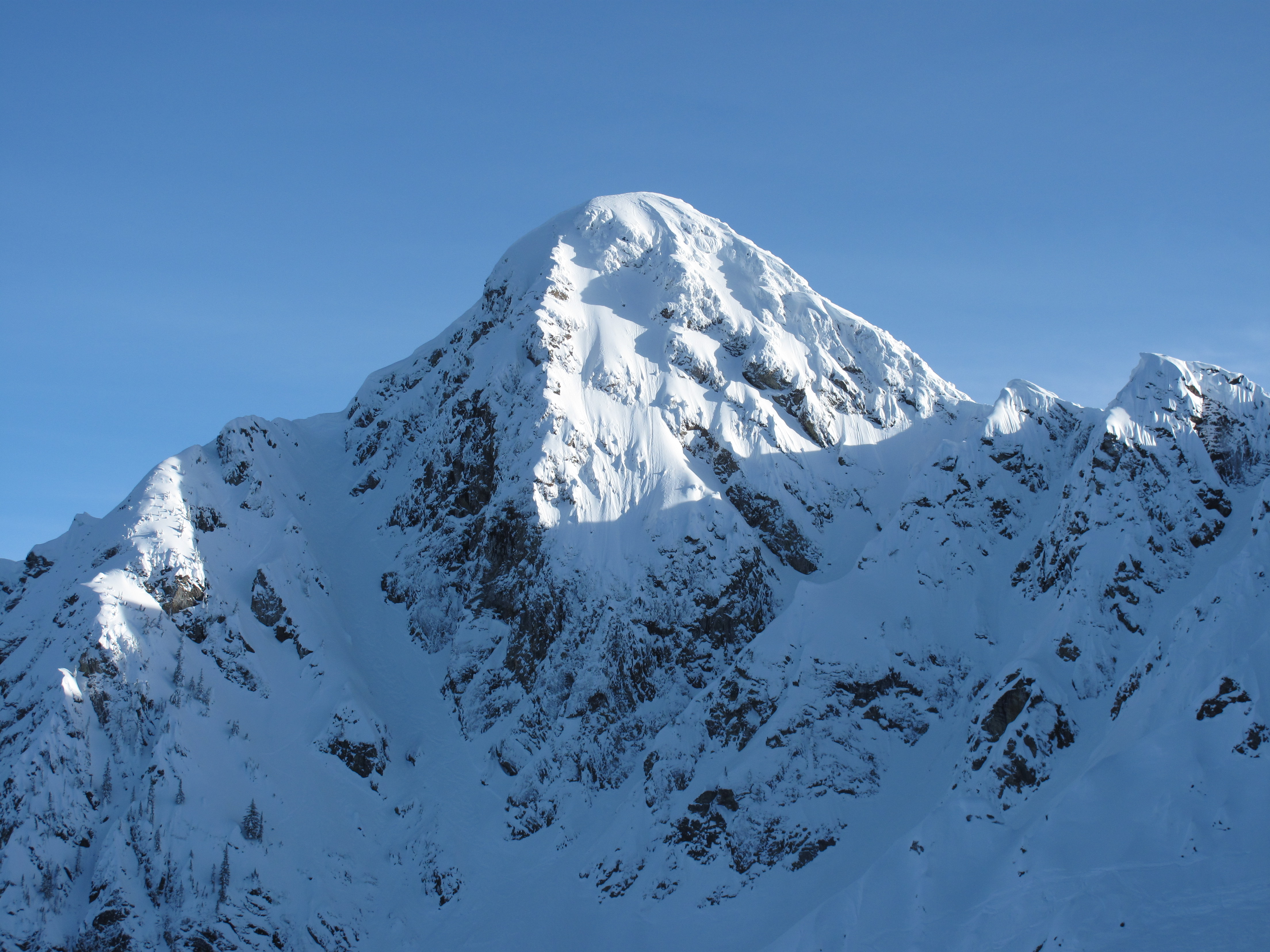
Afternoon shadows on Mount Mackenzie

== See also ==
- Geography of British Columbia
