= Mount Wheeler (British Columbia) =

Mountain in British Columbia, Canada

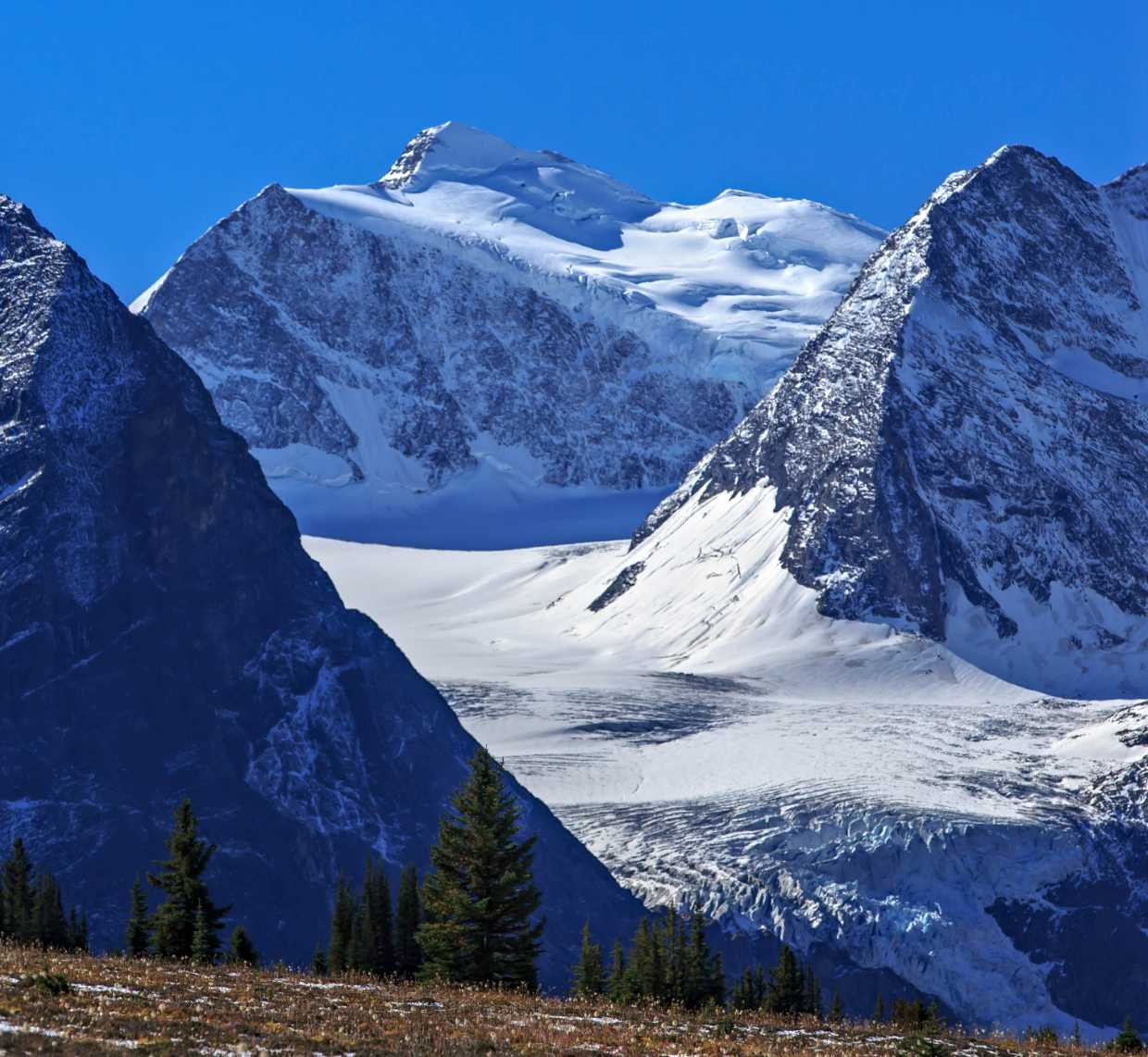
- Mount Wheeler featuring Deville Glacier

Highest point
- Elevation: 3,336 m (10,945 ft)
- Prominence: 741 m (2,431 ft)
- Parent peak: Mount Dawson (3,377 m)
- Listing: Mountains of British Columbia
- Coordinates: 51°06′30″N 117°23′31″W

Geography
- Location within British Columbia Location within Canada
- Interactive map of Mount Wheeler
- Country: Canada
- Province: British Columbia
- Protected area: Glacier National Park
- Parent range: Duncan Ranges; Selkirk Mountains
- Topo map: NTS 82N3 Mount Wheeler

Climbing
- First ascent: 1902 Arthur Oliver Wheeler, Fredrich Michel

Mount Wheeler, is a 3,336-metre (10,945-foot) mountain summit located in Glacier National Park of British Columbia, Canada. It is the third-highest peak in the park, and sixth-highest in the Selkirk Mountains range. The mountain is a remote 60 km (37 mi) east of Revelstoke, and 40 km (25 mi) southwest of Golden. Its nearest higher peak is Mount Selwyn, 5.1 km (3.2 mi) to the north-northwest. Mount Wheeler is surrounded by ice, including the Deville Glacier, Deville Névé, Black Glacier, and Thor Glacier. Precipitation runoff from the mountain and meltwater from its glaciers drains into tributaries of the Incomappleux and Beaver Rivers.

== History ==
The first ascent of the mountain was made in 1902 by Arthur Oliver Wheeler and Fredrich Michel. Mount Wheeler was named in 1904 for Arthur Oliver Wheeler (1860-1945), a Dominion Land Surveyor who made the first ascent of the peak, and co-founder and first president of the Alpine Club of Canada. The mountain's name was officially adopted September 8, 1932, by the Geographical Names Board of Canada.

== Climate ==
Based on the Köppen climate classification, Mount Wheeler is located in a subarctic climate zone with cold, snowy winters, and mild summers. Winter temperatures can drop below −20 °C with wind chill factors below −30 °C.

== Gallery ==
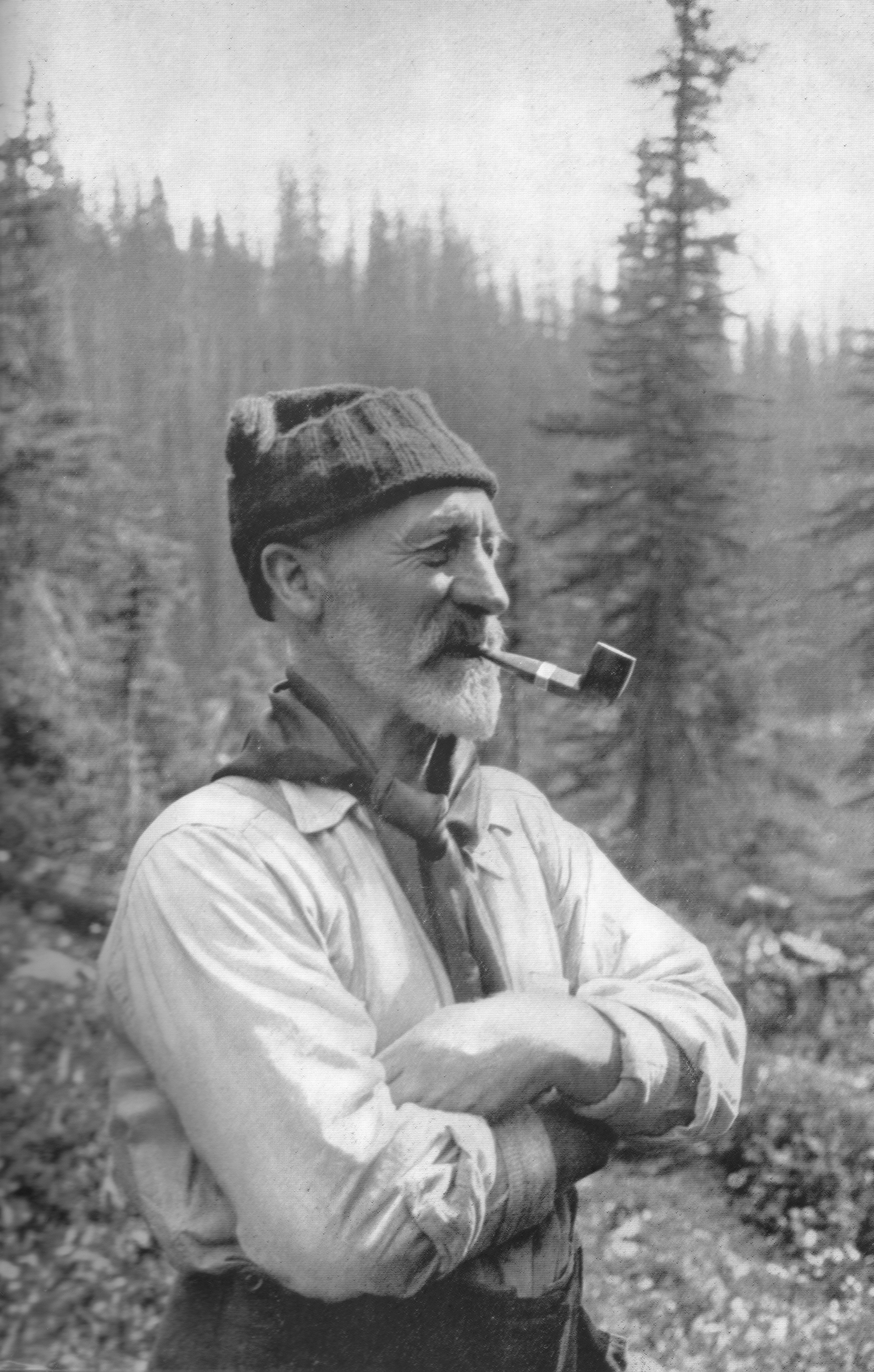
Wheeler

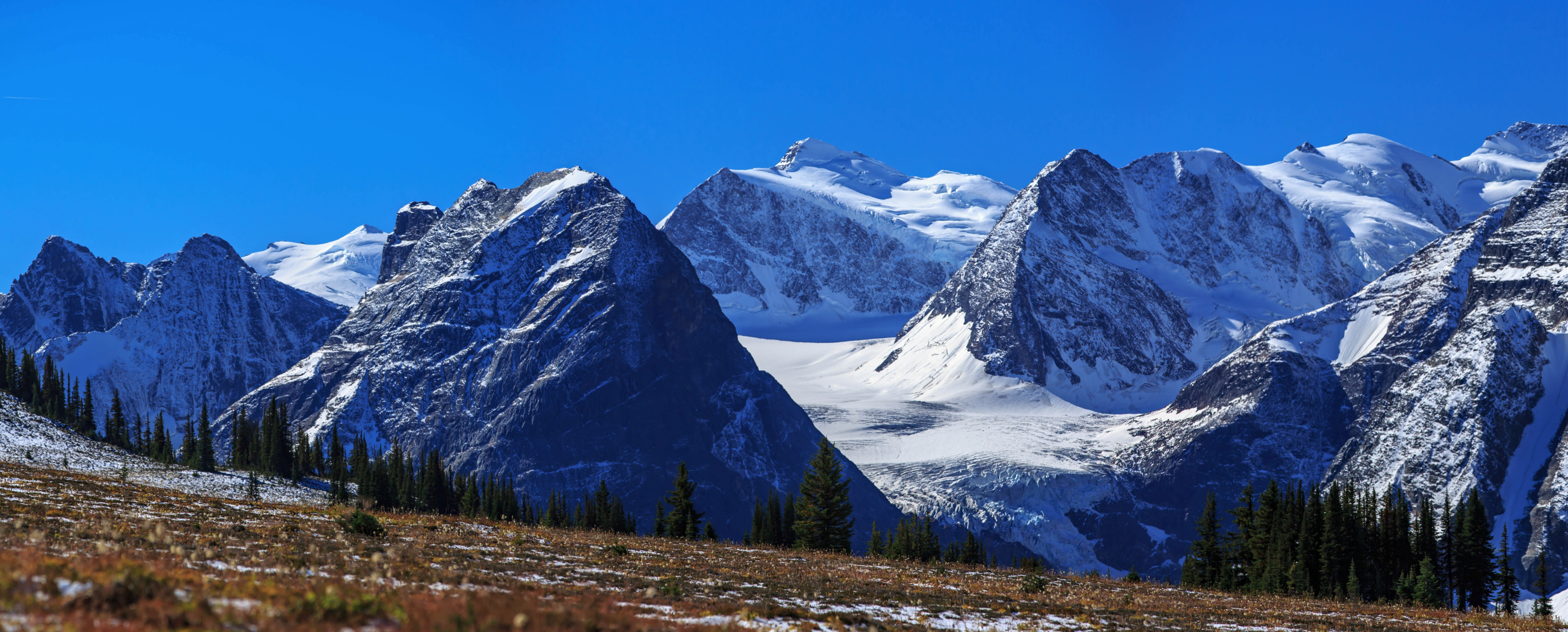
Mount Topham and Mount Wheeler from north

== See also ==
- Geography of British Columbia
