= Albert Peak =

Mountain in British Columbia, Canada

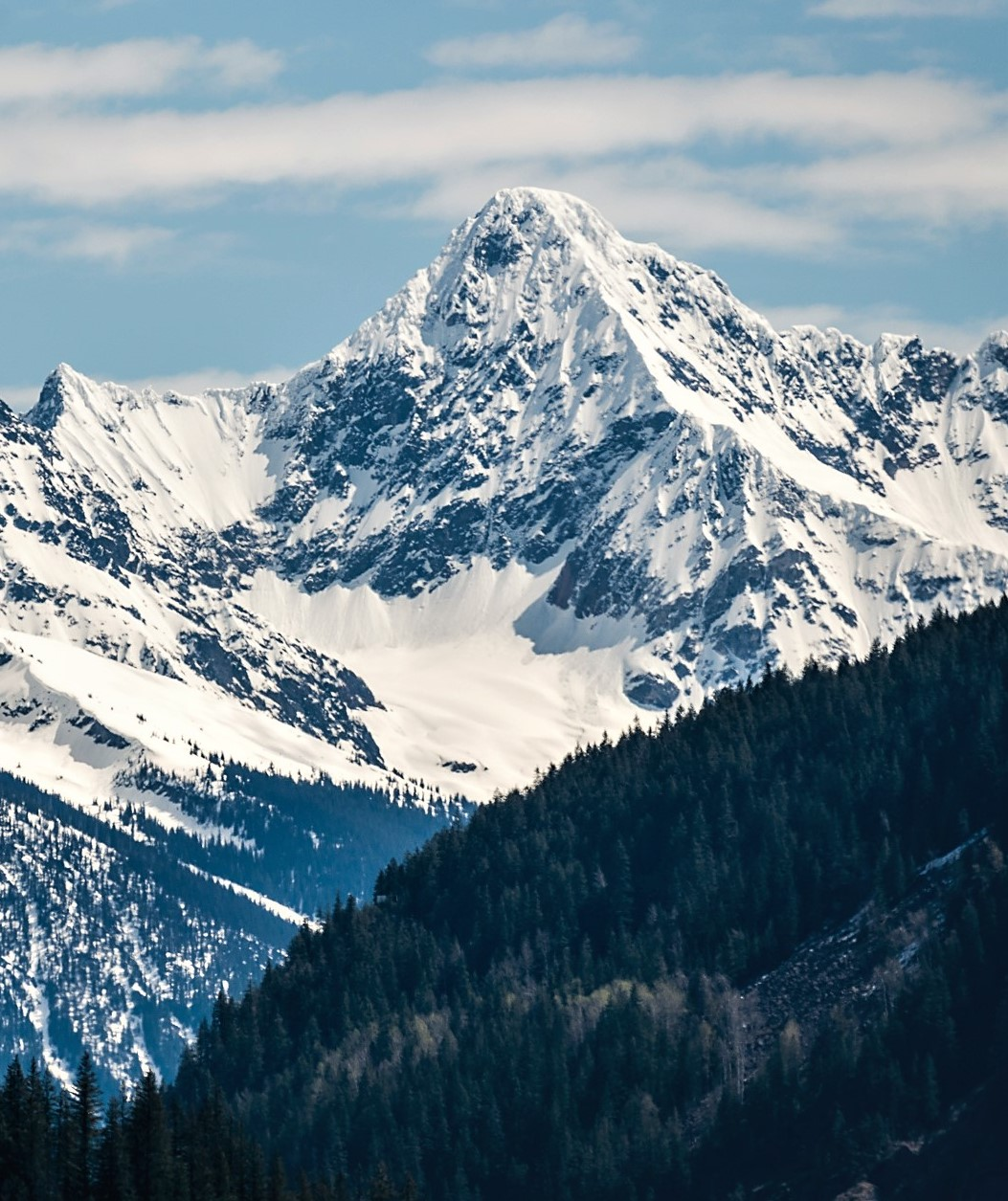
- West aspect

Highest point
- Elevation: 3,045 m (9,990 ft)
- Prominence: 1,445 m (4,741 ft)
- Parent peak: Mount Bonney (3,100 m)
- Isolation: 27.5 km (17.1 mi)
- Listing: Mountains of British Columbia
- Coordinates: 51°02′17″N 117°51′02″W

Naming
- Etymology: Albert Luther Rogers

Geography
- Location within British Columbia Location within Canada
- Interactive map of Albert Peak
- Country: Canada
- Province: British Columbia
- District: Kootenay Land District
- Parent range: Duncan Ranges ← Selkirk Mountains
- Topo map: NTS 82N4 Illecillewaet

Climbing
- First ascent: 1909

Albert Peak is a 3,045-metre (9,990-foot) mountain summit located in British Columbia, Canada.

== Description ==
Albert Peak is situated 25 km (16 mi) east of Revelstoke, 7 km (4.3 mi) southeast of Mount Revelstoke National Park and 11 km (6.8 mi) southwest of Glacier National Park. It is the highest point of the North Duncan Ranges which is a subrange of the Selkirk Mountains. The nearest neighbor is North Albert Peak, 2 km (1.2 mi) to the immediate northwest. Most precipitation runoff from the mountain drains into tributaries of the nearby Illecillewaet River, whereas the south slope drains to the Akolkolex River. Albert Peak is more notable for its steep rise above local terrain than for its absolute elevation. Topographic relief is significant as the summit rises 2,465 meters (8,087 ft) above the Illecillewaet Valley in 6 km (3.7 mi). The peak is visible from Highway 1 (the Trans-Canada Highway) between Revelstoke and Rogers Pass. Despite being an iconic landform near the highway, it is rarely climbed because of rotten rock. The first ascent of the summit was made in 1909 by W. A. Alldritt and G. L. Haggen.

== Etymology ==
The landform was named in 1883 by Principal Grant to honor Albert Luther Rogers (1859–1929), the nephew of Major A. B. Rogers, and his assistant while exploring this area 1881–82 for a Canadian Pacific Railway route through the Selkirk and Rocky Mountains. Albert Rogers was born June 19, 1859, in Waterville, Minnesota, and died May 16, 1929, in Waterville, Washington. He was a civil engineer, civic leader and merchant in Waterville, as well as regent for the University of Washington (1909–1913). The mountain's toponym was officially adopted September 8, 1932, by the Geographical Names Board of Canada.

== Climate ==
Based on the Köppen climate classification, Albert Peak is located in a subarctic climate zone with cold, snowy winters, and mild summers. Winter temperatures can drop below −20 °C with wind chill factors below −30 °C. This climate supports the Albert Glacier on the northeast slope.

== Gallery ==
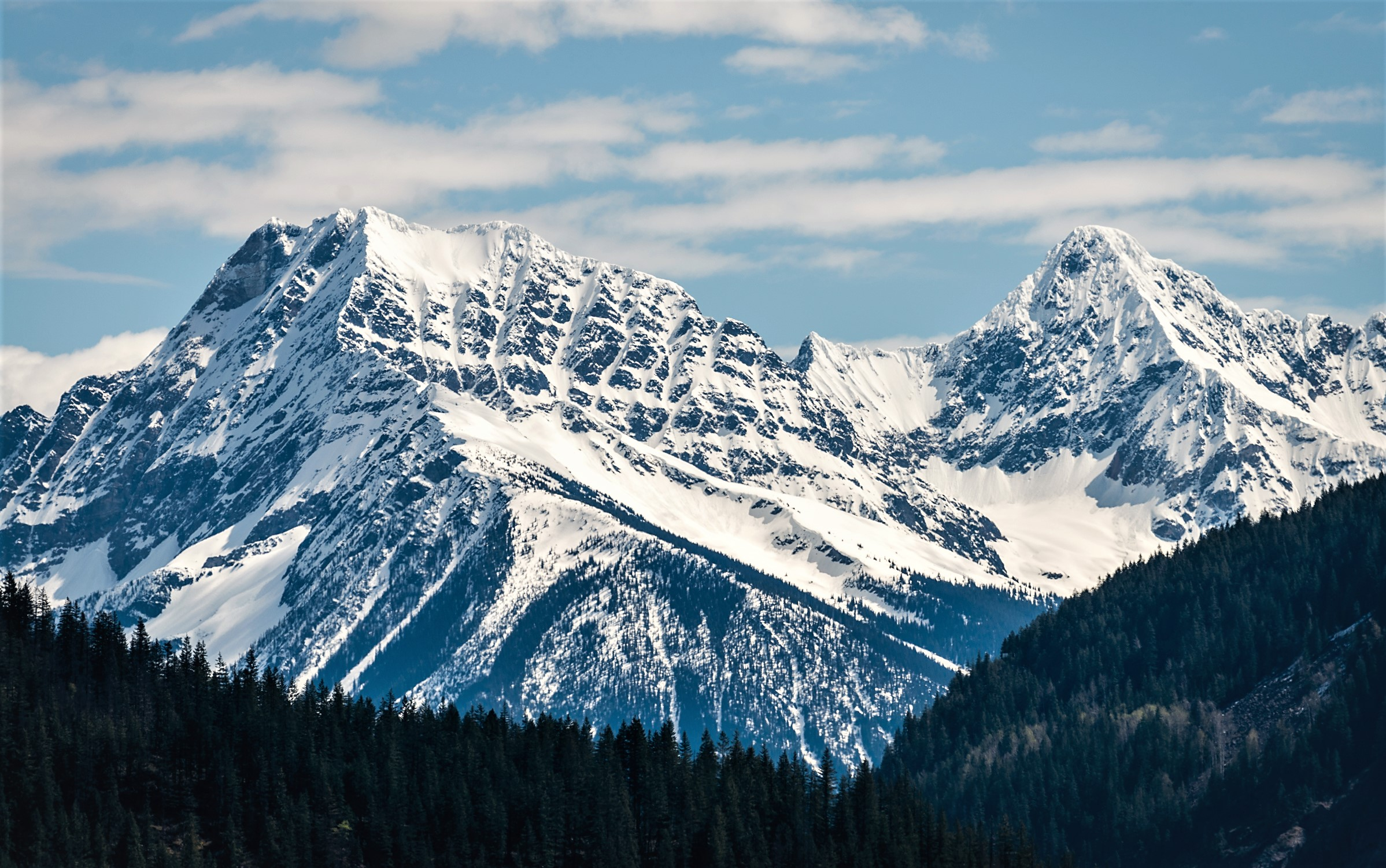
The Albert Peaks. North Albert Peak (left) and Albert Peak (right)

== See also ==
- Geography of British Columbia
