= Revelstoke Mountain Resort =

Ski resort in Canada

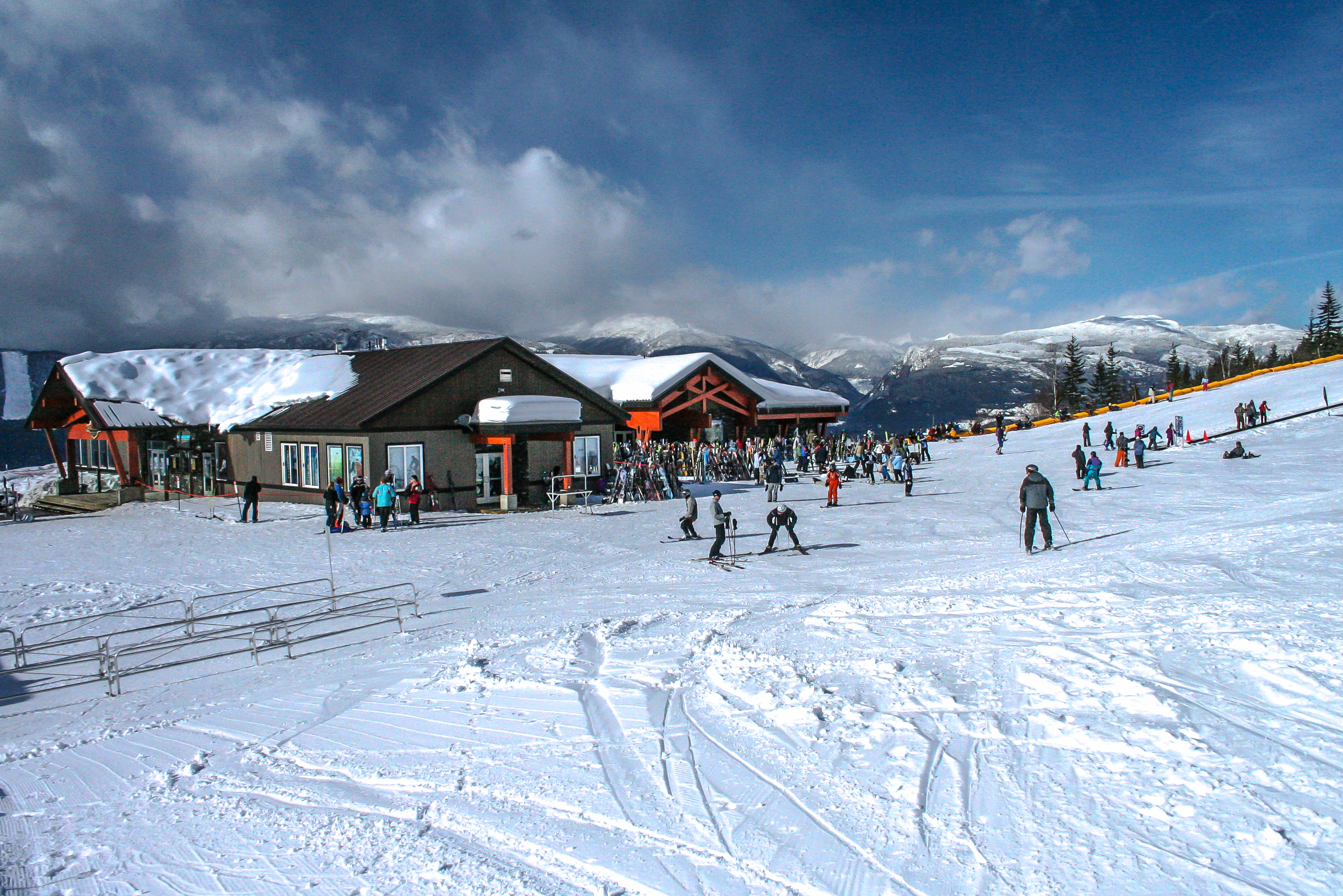
- Mount Revelstoke, North America's largest vertical drop at 1713 m (5620 ft).

- Location within British Columbia Location within Canada
- Location: British Columbia, Canada
- Nearest city: Revelstoke
- Coordinates: 50°57′15″N 118°9′15″W
- Vertical: 1,710 m (5,620 ft)
- Top elevation: 2,200 m (7,300 ft)
- Base elevation: 510 m (1,680 ft)
- Skiable area: 1,263 hectares (3,120 acres)
- Trails: 40 Designated Trails; 12% Easiest; 43% More Difficult; 45% Most Difficult and Expert
- Longest run: 15.2 km (9.4 mi) (Last Spike)
- Lift system: 5 total (1 high-speed gondola lift, 2 high-speed quad chairlifts, 1 fixed-grip quad, 1 magic carpet)
- Snowfall: 10.5 m (410 in) per year
- Website: www.revelstokemountainresort.com

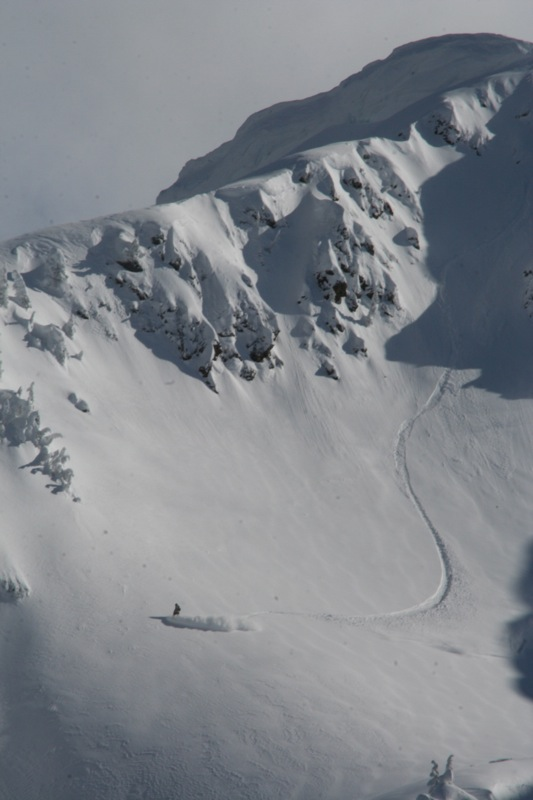

Revelstoke Mountain Resort (RMR) is a ski resort on Mount Mackenzie, just outside Revelstoke, British Columbia, Canada. It is owned by Northland Properties.

Currently, the resort has a vertical drop of 1,713 metres (5,620 ft), the longest vertical descent of any ski resort in North America. In terms of size, it is similar to other major resorts, such as Breckenridge and Panorama, and is about a third the size of Whistler Blackcomb. When completed, it will have 10,000 acres of skiable terrain, which will make it the largest in North America.

== History ==
Mount Mackenzie and the surrounding area has hosted a number of skiing operations for many years. Starting in the late 1960s a single two-person lift has been operational on the lower slopes, forming the basis of a resort known as Powder Springs. More recently, both Sno-Cat and Heliskiing operations have operated in the bowls on the upper elevations.

The modern resort opened for the first time on December 21, 2007, with a gondola providing access to the mountain and a high speed quad known as The Stoke lapping trails on the upper portion of Mount MacKenzie. Local youth athlete Alex Wadey and mayor Mark McKee cut the ribbon in the opening ceremony and were the first to ski down the new runs.

It was thought to be the biggest North American ski resort debut in twenty years. However, the event was overshadowed by the death of an Edmonton ski instructor who disappeared on the mountain's "Jalapeno" run and whose body was found in a tree well three days later on Christmas Day.

During the summer of 2008, further trail cutting in the "North Bowl" area extended the skiable area and added a number of expert runs and glades. The Ripper, a second high speed quad, was added in 2008. The gondola was extended down the hill in December 2008, from the original base area to the new village area further down the hill. With this extension the lift-served vertical increased to 1,713 m (5,620 ft), overtaking Whistler's 1,610 m (5,280 ft), making it the largest in North America.

In December 2019, a fixed grip quad known as Stellar was opened. The lift carries 1,800 people per hour and has a 3-minute ride time, servicing a new learning pod and making it possible to access The Ripper without having to ride The Stoke.

== Construction ==
In order to build the local economy, the City of Revelstoke started the process of finding outside investors to dramatically expand the ski area and build a large complex at the base of the mountain. Funding was eventually secured from a group of private investors that appear to have since organized as Revelstoke Mountain Resort. The Government of Canada and Government of British Columbia are also involved, but it is not clear if they have a financial stake – BC is reported to have sold them some Crown Land but is apparently otherwise uninvolved. The development was priced at $1 billion in total, and an agreement among the major parties was signed on 20 March 2005. The complete project is expected to take fifteen years to complete.

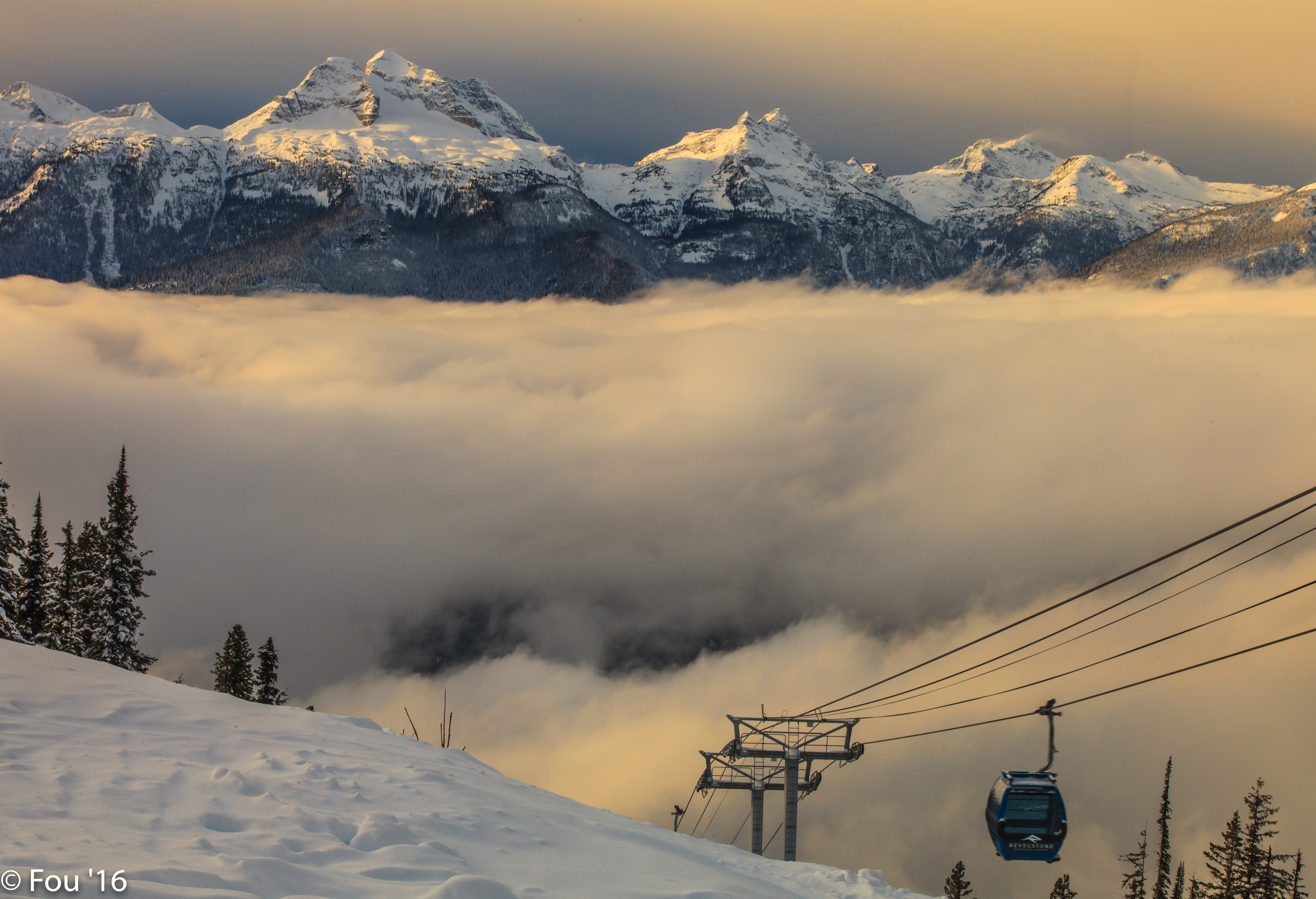
Mount Begbie range seen from ski lift area

== Terrain Aspects ==
- North: 26%
- West: 44%
- East: 4%
- South: 26%

== Events ==
From the 2009/2010 season, RMR is the host for the Canadian Championships of the Freeskiing World Tour, the largest competitive Big Mountain competition. By hosting this event annually, Revelstoke Mountain Resort joins other mountain resorts such as Kirkwood, Snowbird, Palisades Tahoe, and Telluride on the World Tour, helping add to Revelstoke's reputation for big mountain terrain.

== Future plans ==
The Master Plan calls for the eventual construction of as many as 25 lifts in total, both in the currently opened western face of the mountain, as well as the bowls to the south currently served by the cat-ski operations.

== See also ==
- List of ski areas and resorts in Canada
