= Mount Dawson (Canada) =

Mountain in British Columbia, Canada

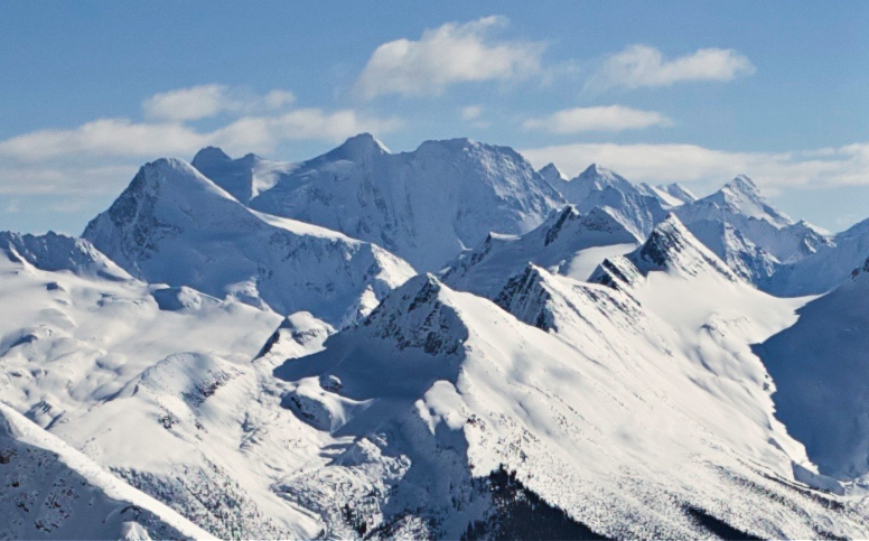
- Mt. Dawson centered in the distance

Highest point
- Elevation: 3,377 m (11,079 ft)
- Prominence: 2,045 m (6,709 ft)
- Parent peak: Mount Sir Sandford
- Coordinates: 51°09′06″N 117°25′14″W

Geography
- Location within British Columbia
- Location: British Columbia, Canada
- District: Kootenay Land District
- Parent range: Selkirk Mountains
- Topo map: NTS 82N3 Mount Wheeler

Climbing
- First ascent: August 13, 1899 Charles E Fay, Herschel C Parker, Edward Feuz Sr., Christian Hasler Sr.

Mount Dawson, elevation 3,377 metres (11,079 ft), is a massif in the Selkirk Mountains of British Columbia, Canada, located in Glacier National Park to the southeast of Rogers Pass. It is a double summit, the highest of which is Hasler Peak, the second peak being Feuz Peak, with Hasler Peak's elevation making it the highest summit in Glacier National Park and the second highest in the Selkirks. Mount Dawson is ranked as the 58th highest mountain in British Columbia. The Dawson Glacier is located on its eastern flank.

== Name ==
Mount Dawson was named 1888 by Reverend W.S. Green for geologist George Mercer Dawson (1846–1901), member of the British North America International Boundary Commission, 1873, later director of the Geological Survey of Canada (1895–1901).

== Climate ==
Based on the Köppen climate classification, Mount Dawson is located in a subarctic climate zone with cold, snowy winters, and mild summers. Temperatures can drop below −20 °C with wind chill factors below −30 °C.

== See also ==
- List of mountains of Canada
- Geography of British Columbia
- Geology of British Columbia
