= Duncan Ranges =

Mountain range in British Columbia, Canada

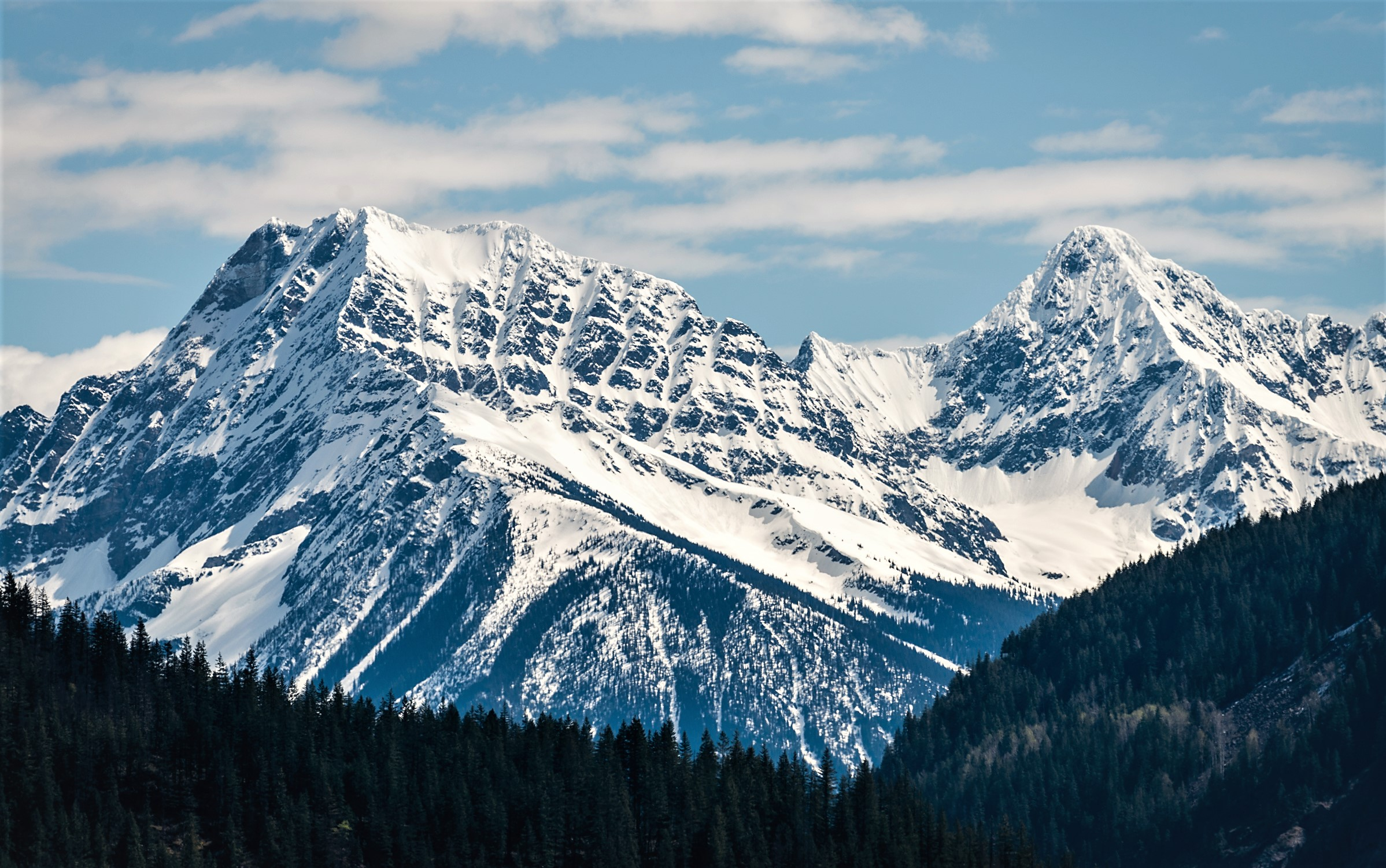
- The Albert Peaks

Highest point
- Peak: Mount Templeman
- Elevation: 3,074 m (10,085 ft)
- Coordinates: 50°41′23″N 117°12′18″W

Geography
- Location within British Columbia
- Country: Canada
- Province: British Columbia
- District: Kootenay Land District
- Range coordinates: 50°50′59″N 117°28′59″W
- Parent range: Selkirk Mountains
- Topo map: NTS 82K13 Camborne

The Duncan Ranges are a subrange of the Selkirk Mountains of the Columbia Mountains in southeastern British Columbia, Canada, located west of the Duncan River, southeast of Revelstoke.

== Notable peaks ==
- Albert Peak
- North Albert Peak
- Mount Cartier
- Ghost Peak
- Mount Mackenzie
- Mount Templeman

== Sub-ranges ==
- Badshot Range
