= Sentinel Peak (Adamant Range) =

Mountain in Columbia-Shuswap Regional District, British Columbia, Canada

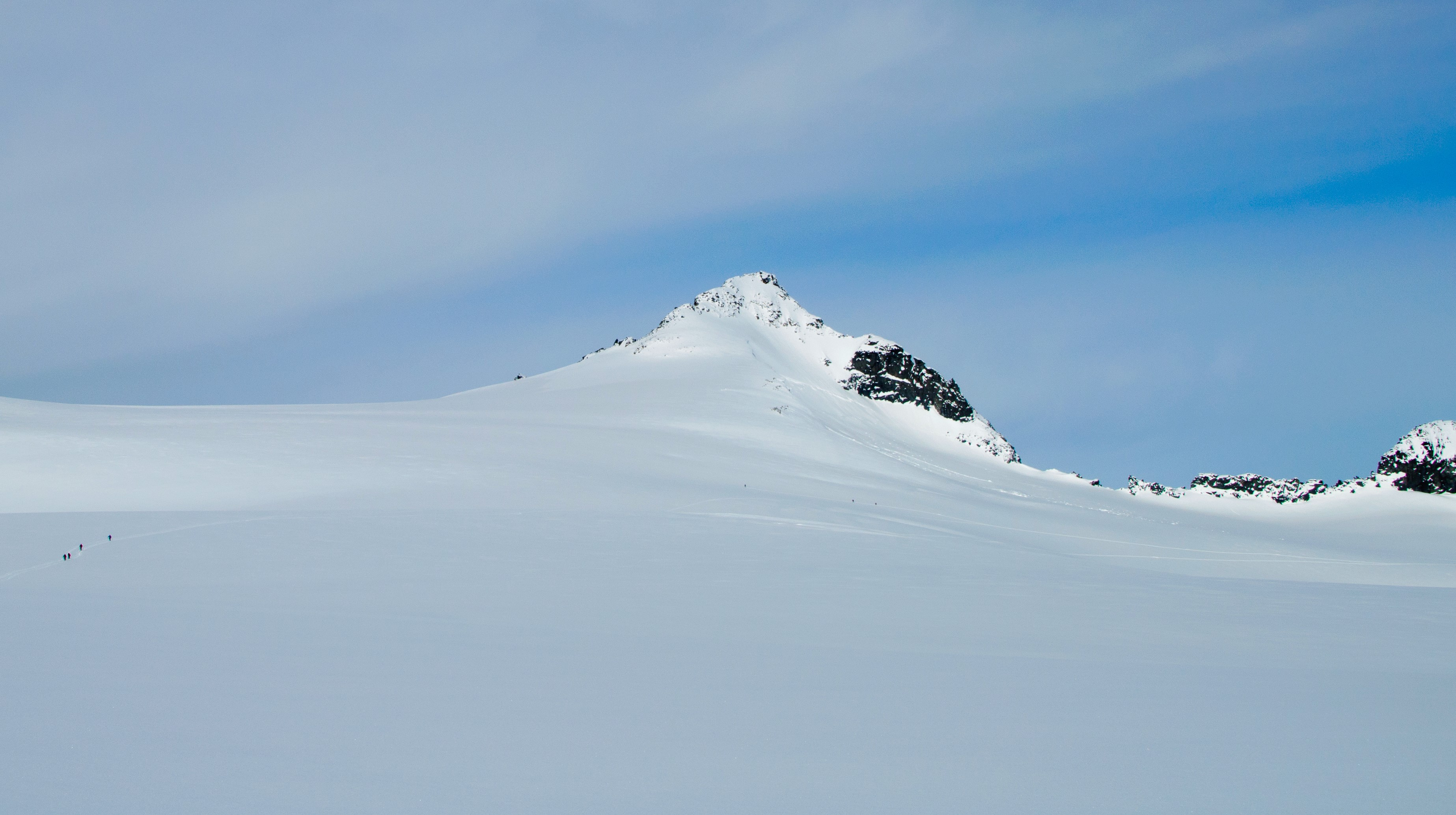
- East aspect

Highest point
- Elevation: 2,992 m (9,816 ft)
- Prominence: 111 m (364 ft)
- Parent peak: Adamant Mountain (3,345 m)
- Isolation: 1.45 km (0.90 mi)
- Listing: Mountains of British Columbia
- Coordinates: 51°44′44″N 117°52′20″W

Geography
- Location within British Columbia Location within Canada
- Interactive map of Sentinel Peak
- Country: Canada
- Province: British Columbia
- District: Kootenay Land District
- Parent range: Adamant Range; Selkirk Mountains
- Topo map: NTS 82N12 Mount Sir Sandford

Climbing
- First ascent: 1946
- Easiest route: Scrambling

Sentinel Peak is a 2,992-metre (9,816-foot) mountain in British Columbia, Canada.

== Description ==
Sentinel Peak is part of the Adamant Range which is a subrange of the Selkirk Mountains. It is located 80 km (50 mi) northwest of Golden and 30 km (19 mi) north of Glacier National Park. Sentinel Peak is highly glaciated with the Granite Glacier west of the peak, Echo Glacier in the north cirque, and the Gothics Glacier on the south and east slopes of the peak. Precipitation runoff and glacial meltwater from the mountain drains to Kinbasket Lake via Smith and Swan creeks. Topographic relief is significant as the summit rises 1,800 metres (5,905 ft) above Smith Creek in 5 km (3.1 mi) and 1,500 metres (4,921 ft) above Swan Creek in 4 km (2.5 mi). Sentinel Peak is located south of the Bill Putnam hut which makes the peak an excellent ski mountaineering destination. The mountain's toponym was officially adopted on March 4, 1965, by the Geographical Names Board of Canada.

== Climate ==
Based on the Köppen climate classification, Sentinel Peak is located in a subarctic climate zone with cold, snowy winters, and mild summers. Winter temperatures can drop below −20 °C with wind chill factors below −30 °C. This climate supports three glaciers on the slopes of the peak.

== Gallery ==
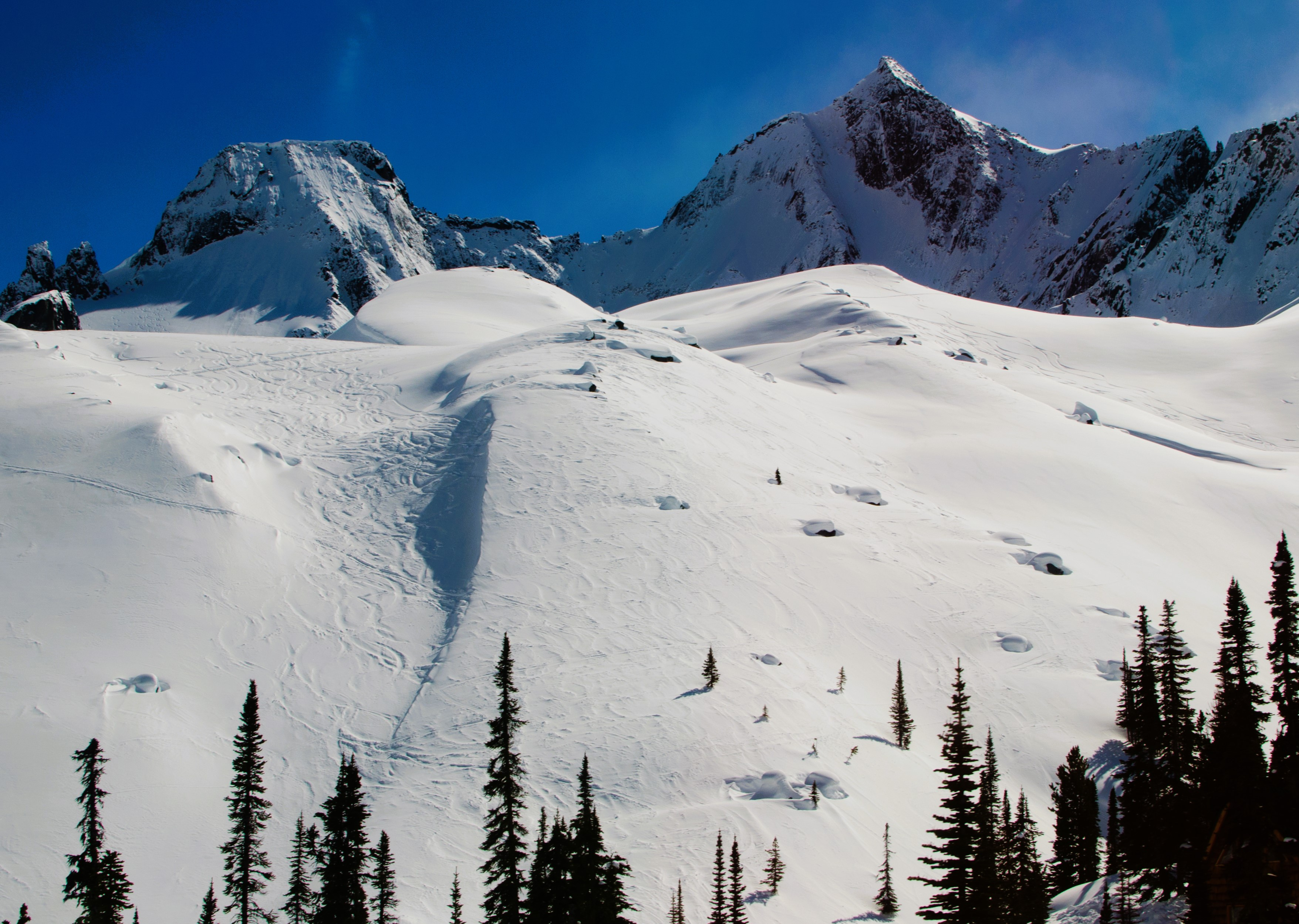
North aspect (right)

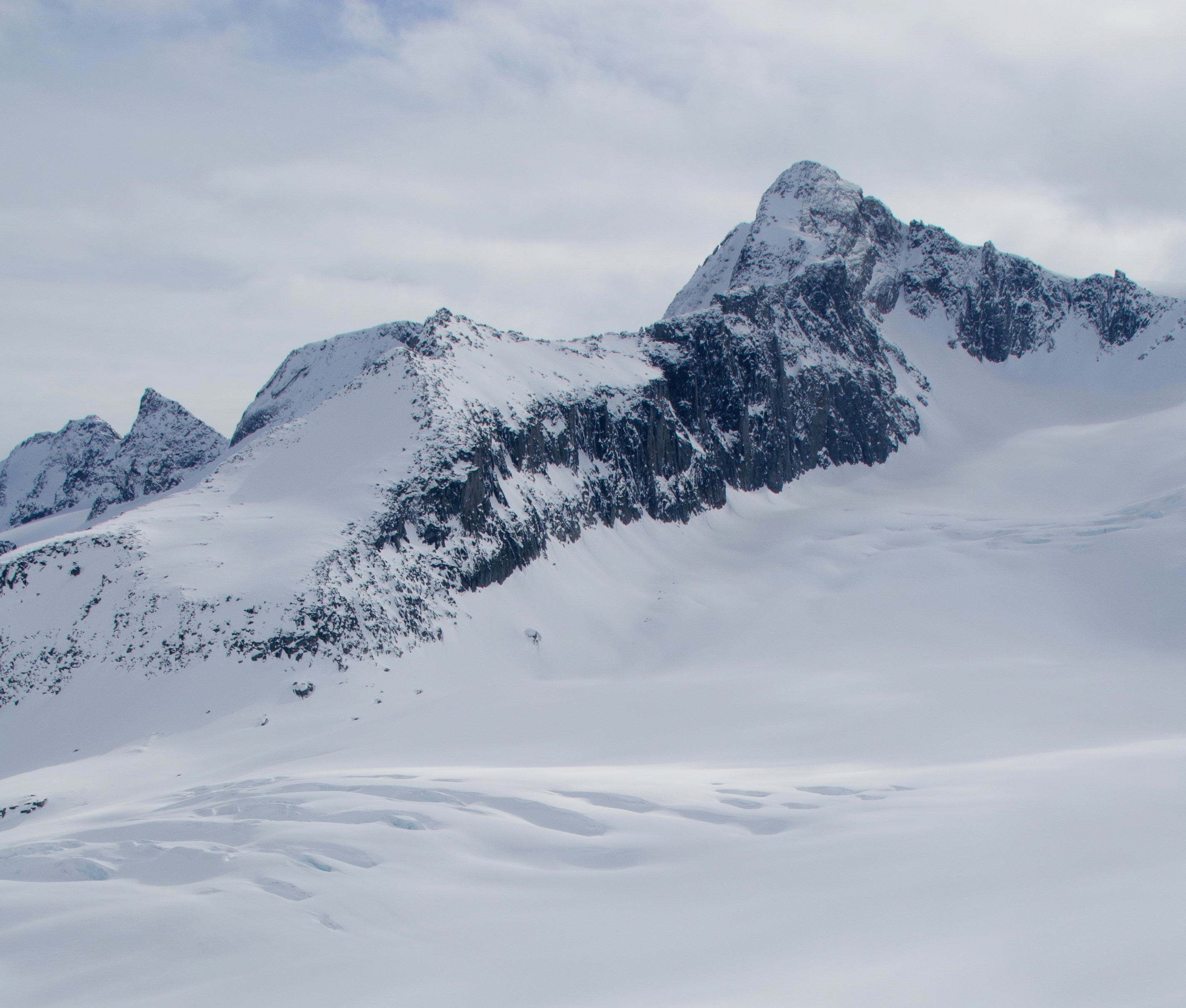
West aspect

== See also ==
- Geography of British Columbia
