= Unicorn Mountain =

Mountain in British Columbia, Canada

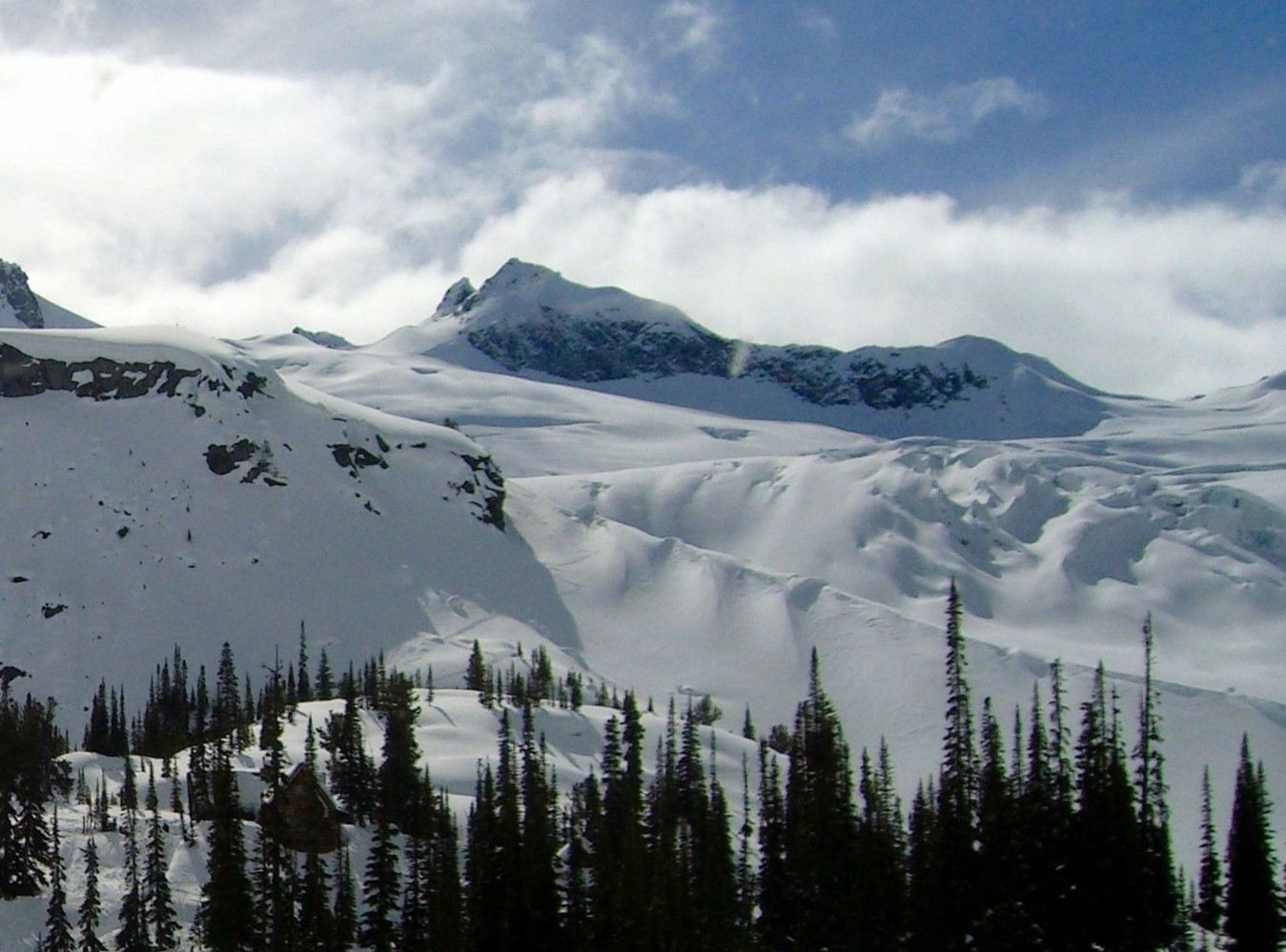
- East aspect

Highest point
- Elevation: 3,010 m (9,880 ft)
- Prominence: 100 m (330 ft)
- Parent peak: Austerity Mountain (3,337 m)
- Isolation: 1.207 km (0.750 mi)
- Listing: Mountains of British Columbia
- Coordinates: 51°44′38″N 117°55′16″W

Geography
- Location within British Columbia Location within Canada
- Country: Canada
- Province: British Columbia
- District: Kootenay Land District
- Parent range: Adamant Range; Selkirk Mountains
- Topo map: NTS 82N12 Mount Sir Sandford

Geology
- Rock type: Granite

Unicorn Mountain is a 3,010-metre (9,880-foot) mountain in British Columbia, Canada.

== Description ==
Unicorn Mountain is part of the Adamant Range which is a subrange of the Selkirk Mountains. It is located 83 km (52 mi) northwest of Golden along the west side of the Rocky Mountain Trench. Unicorn Mountain is glaciated with the Granite Glacier on the east slope. Precipitation runoff and glacial meltwater from the mountain's east slopes drains to Swan Creek, whereas the west slope drains into Austerity Creek, and both are tributaries of the Columbia River. Topographic relief is significant as the summit rises 1,510 metres (4,954 ft) above Austerity Creek in 4 km (2.5 mi). Unicorn Mountain is located west of the Bill Putnam hut which makes the mountain's slopes an excellent ski mountaineering destination. The mountain's descriptive toponym was officially adopted on March 4, 1965, by the Geographical Names Board of Canada.

== Climate ==
Based on the Köppen climate classification, Unicorn Mountain is located in a subarctic climate zone with cold, snowy winters, and mild summers. Winter temperatures can drop below −20 °C with wind chill factors below −30 °C.

== See also ==
- Geography of British Columbia
