= Pioneer Peak (British Columbia) =

Mountain in British Columbia, Canada

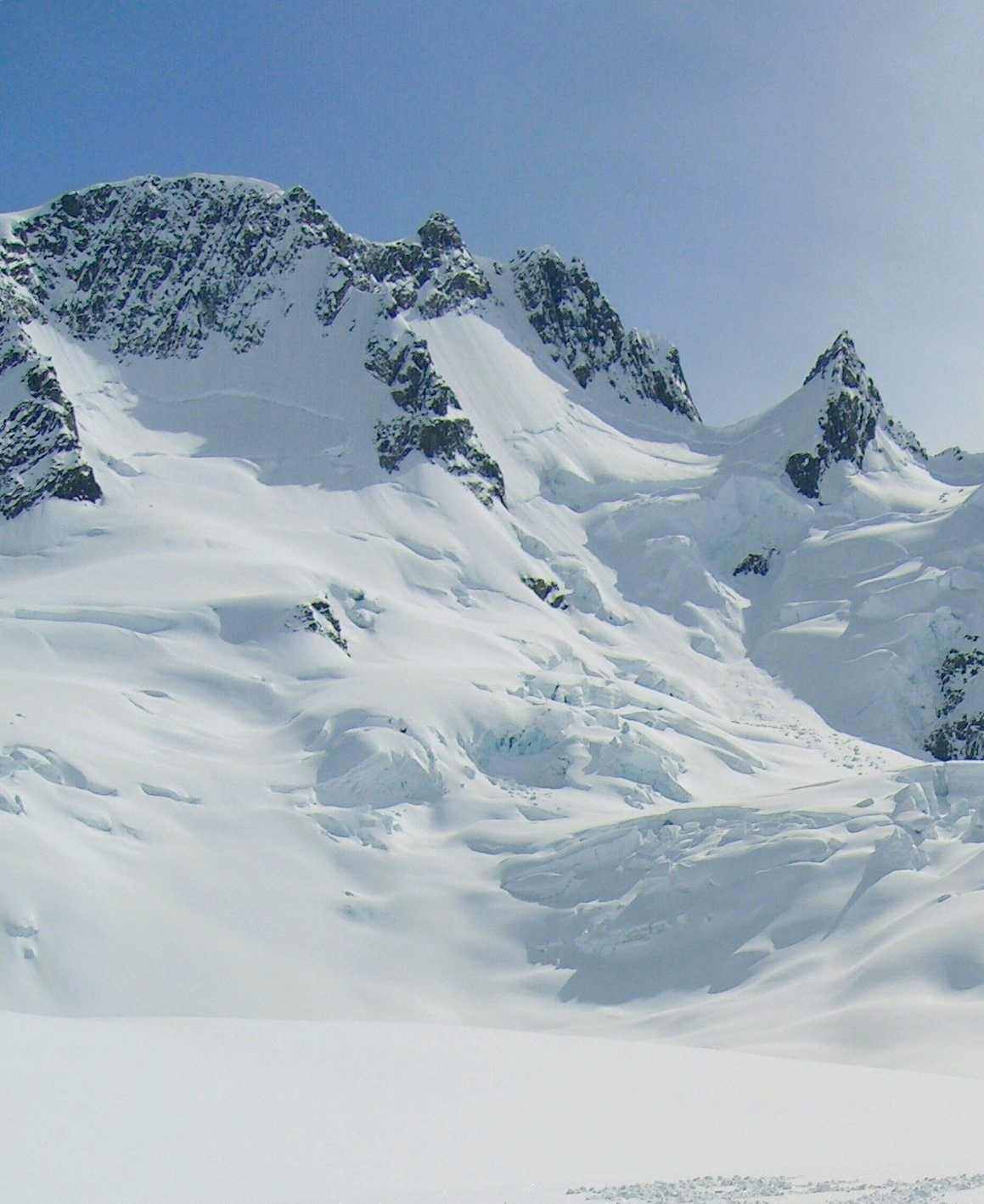
- North aspect

Highest point
- Elevation: 3,245 m (10,646 ft)
- Prominence: 195 m (640 ft)
- Parent peak: Adamant Mountain (3,345 m)
- Isolation: 1.158 km (0.720 mi)
- Listing: Mountains of British Columbia
- Coordinates: 51°44′03″N 117°53′15″W

Geography
- Location within British Columbia Location within Canada
- Interactive map of Pioneer Peak
- Country: Canada
- Province: British Columbia
- District: Kootenay Land District
- Parent range: Adamant Range; Selkirk Mountains
- Topo map: NTS 82N12 Mount Sir Sandford

Geology
- Rock type: Granite

Climbing
- First ascent: 1911
- Easiest route: Scrambling, Northeast Face

Pioneer Peak is a 3,245-metre (10,646-foot) mountain in British Columbia, Canada.

== Description ==
Pioneer Peak is part of the Adamant Range which is a subrange of the Selkirk Mountains. It is located 80 km (50 mi) northwest of Golden and 30 km (19 mi) north of Glacier National Park. Pioneer Peak is highly glaciated with the Granite Glacier to the north, Gothics Glacier to the east, and the Adamant Glacier to the south. Precipitation runoff and glacial meltwater from the mountain's slopes drains north to Swan Creek, east to Smith Creek, south to Palmer Creek, and each are tributaries of the Columbia River. Topographic relief is significant as the summit rises approximately 2,500 metres (8,200 ft) above Kinbasket Lake in 13 km (8.1 mi). Pioneer is located south of the Bill Putnam hut which makes the peak an excellent ski mountaineering destination.

== History ==
The first ascent of the summit was made in 1911 by Howard Palmer, Edward Holway, and Frederic King Butters. The mountain's toponym was officially adopted on March 4, 1965, by the Geographical Names Board of Canada.

== Climate ==
Based on the Köppen climate classification, Pioneer Peak is located in a subarctic climate zone with cold, snowy winters, and mild summers. Winter temperatures can drop below −20 °C with wind chill factors below −30 °C. This climate supports several glaciers surrounding the peak.

== Gallery ==
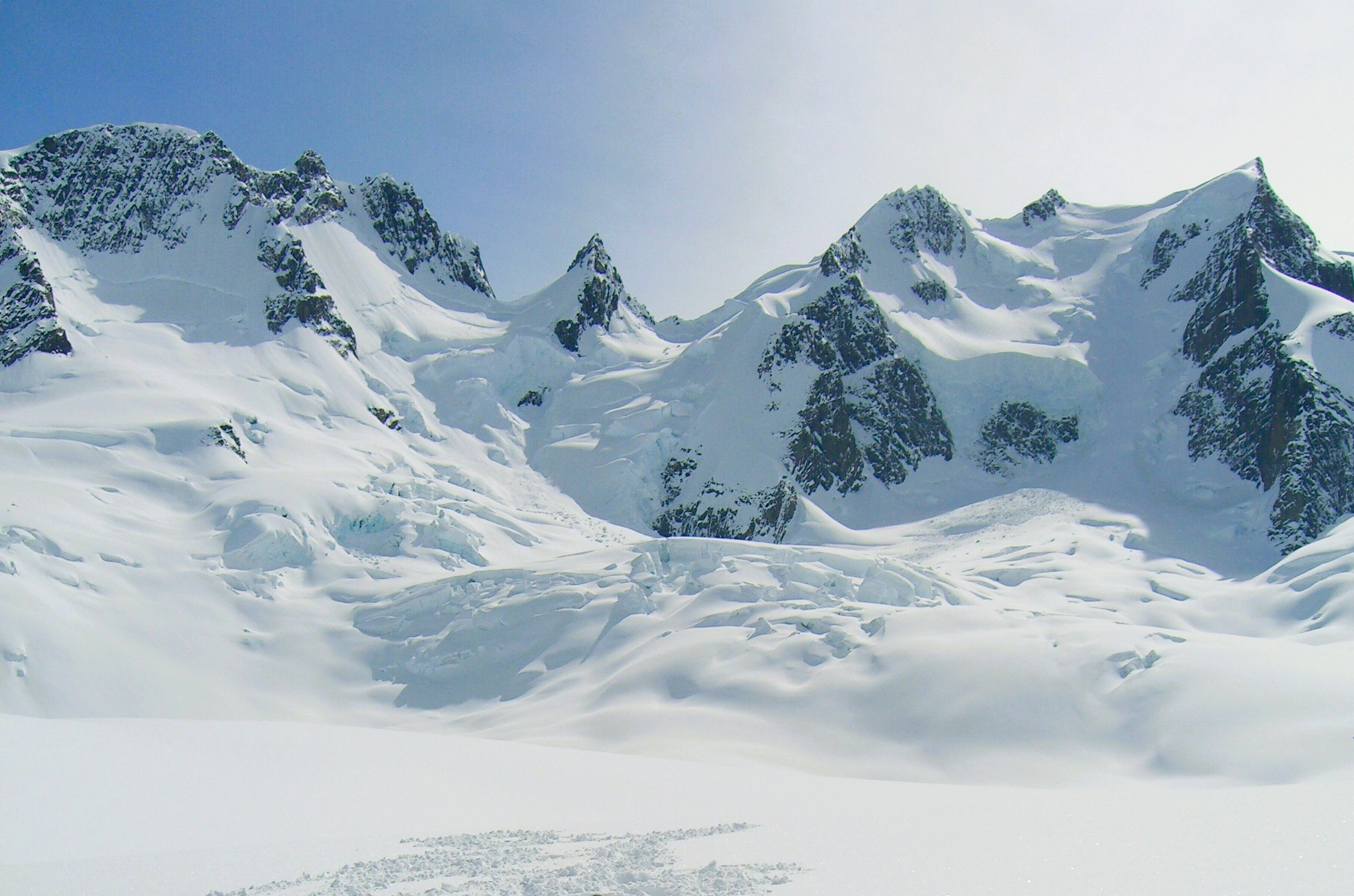
Pioneer Peak (left) and Adamant Mountain (right).
"The Stickle" is the pinnacle between them.

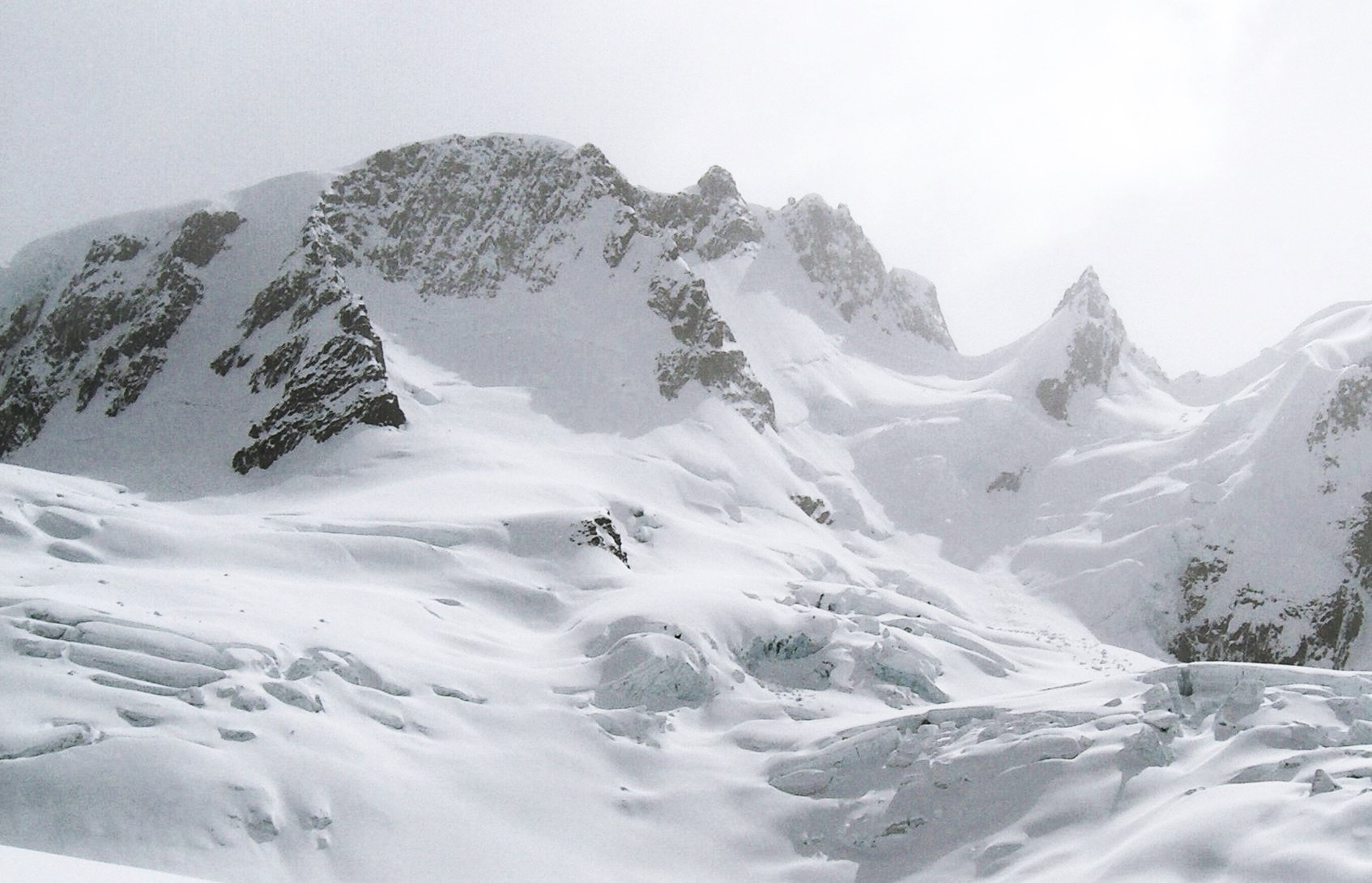
North aspect

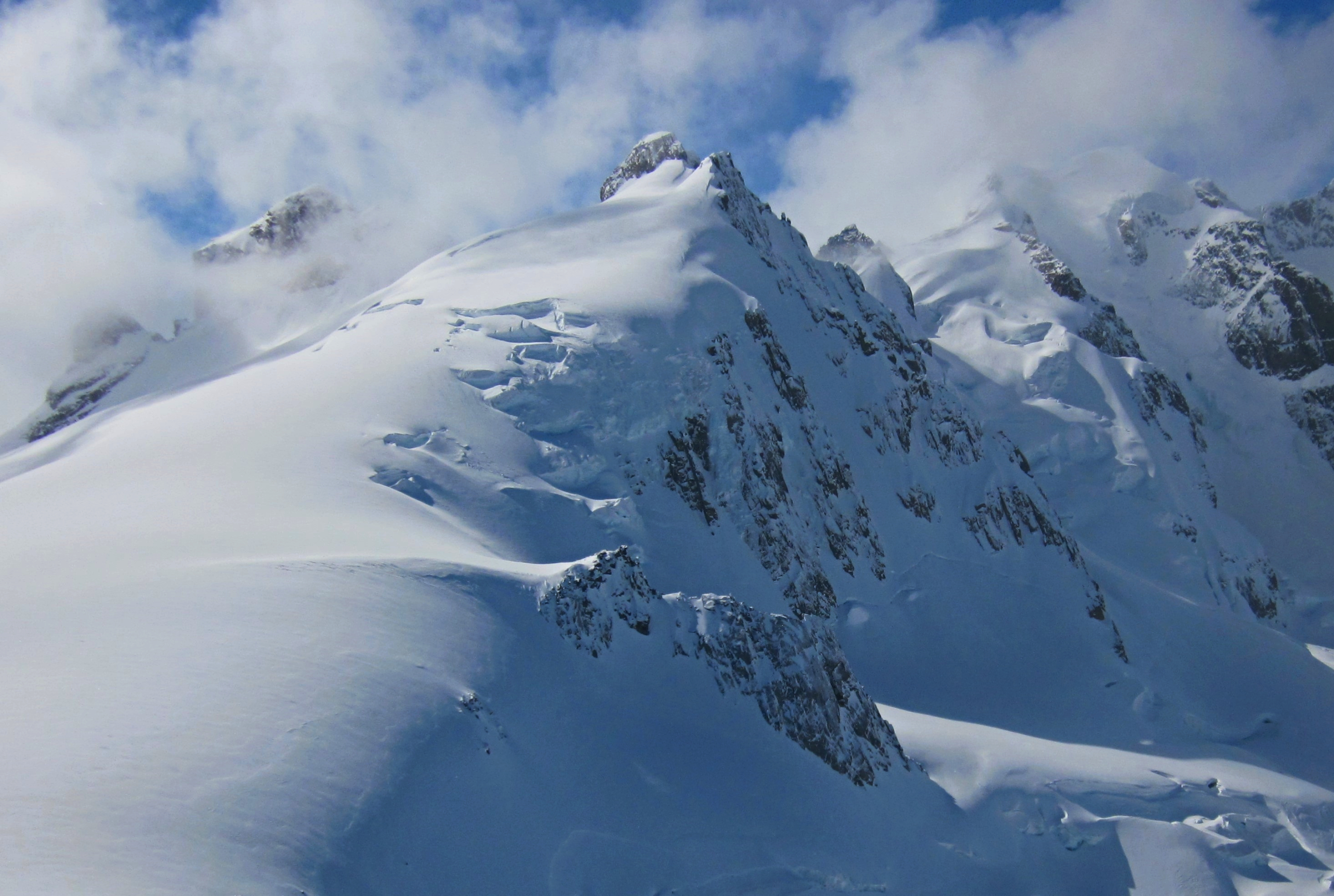
Northeast aspect centered

== See also ==
- Geography of British Columbia
