= Ygdrasil Mountain =

Mountain in British Columbia, Canada

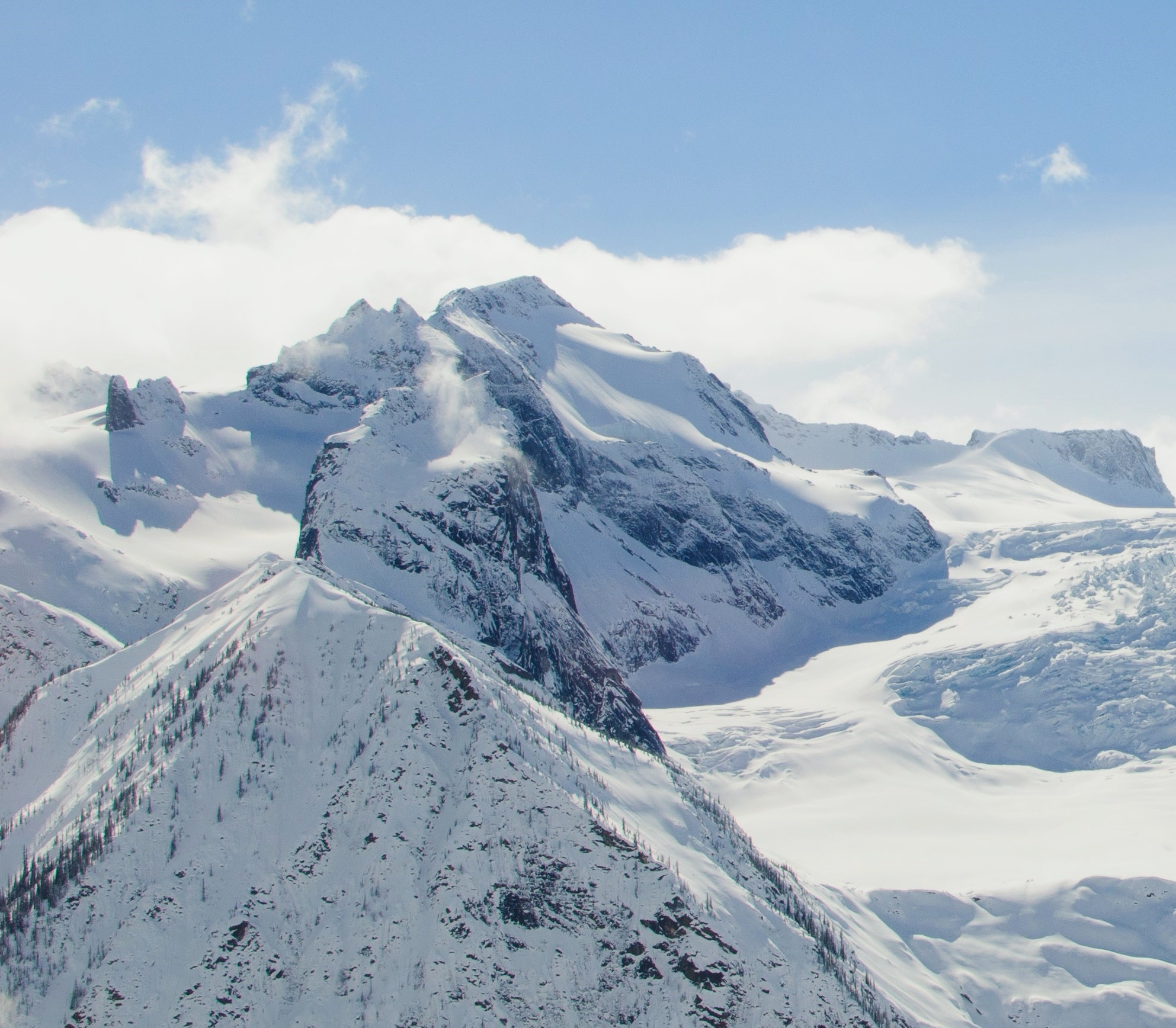
- Northeast aspect, aerial view

Highest point
- Elevation: 2,960 m (9,710 ft)
- Listing: Mountains of British Columbia
- Coordinates: 51°44′14″N 117°49′25″W

Naming
- Etymology: Yggdrasil

Geography
- Location within British Columbia Location within Canada
- Interactive map of Ygdrasil Mountain
- Country: Canada
- Province: British Columbia
- District: Kootenay Land District
- Parent range: Adamant Range; Selkirk Mountains
- Topo map: NTS 82N12 Mount Sir Sandford

Ygdrasil Mountain is a 2,960-metre (9,710-foot) mountain in British Columbia, Canada.

== Description ==
Ygdrasil Mountain is part of the Adamant Range which is a subrange of the Selkirk Mountains. It is located 77 km (48 mi) northwest of Golden and 30 km (19 mi) north of Glacier National Park. Ygdrasil is highly glaciated with glaciers radiating in all directions, most notably the Gothics Glacier to the north. Precipitation runoff and glacial meltwater from the mountain drains to Kinbasket Lake via Smith Creek. Topographic relief is significant as the summit rises 2,200 metres (7,218 ft) above the lake in 9 km (5.6 mi).

== Etymology ==
The mountain's toponym was officially adopted on March 4, 1965, by the Geographical Names Board of Canada. The mountain was named in 1954 by William Lowell Putnam III for Yggdrasil, the great ash tree symbolizing the universe according to Norse mythology. It is pronounced "ig DRAYsel" and was so named to follow the naming theme of nearby Mount Wotan and Mount Fria which were also derived from Norse mythology.

== Climate ==
Based on the Köppen climate classification, Ygdrasil Mountain is located in a subarctic climate zone with cold, snowy winters, and mild summers. Winter temperatures can drop below −20 °C with wind chill factors below −30 °C. This climate supports glaciers surrounding the peak.

== Gallery ==
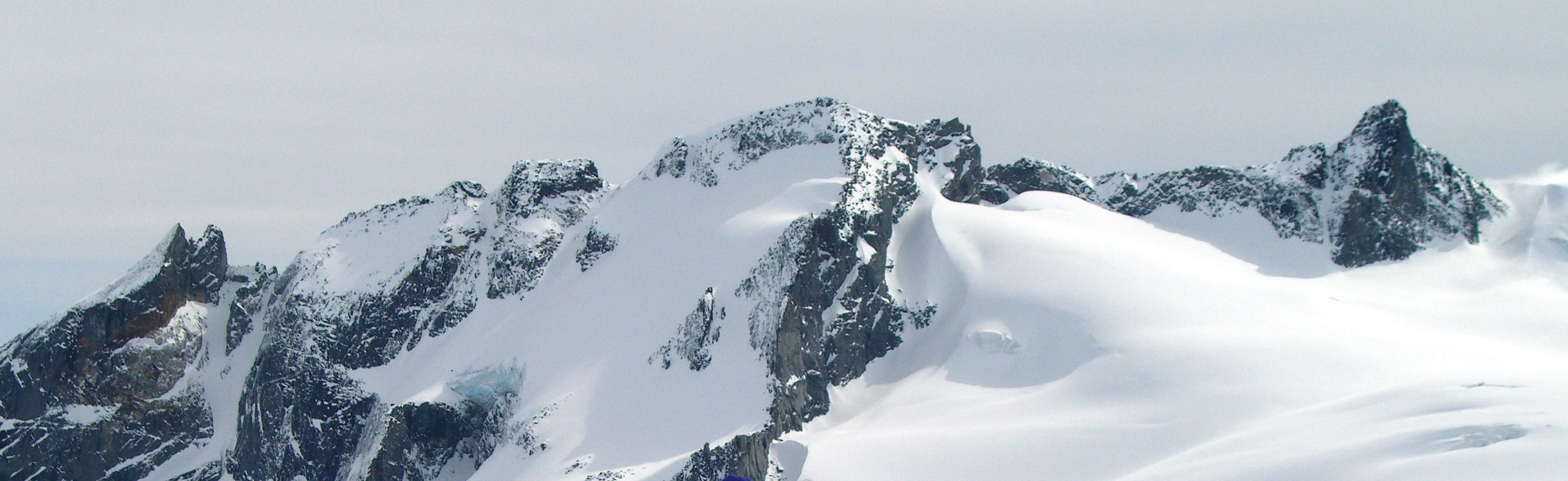
West aspect

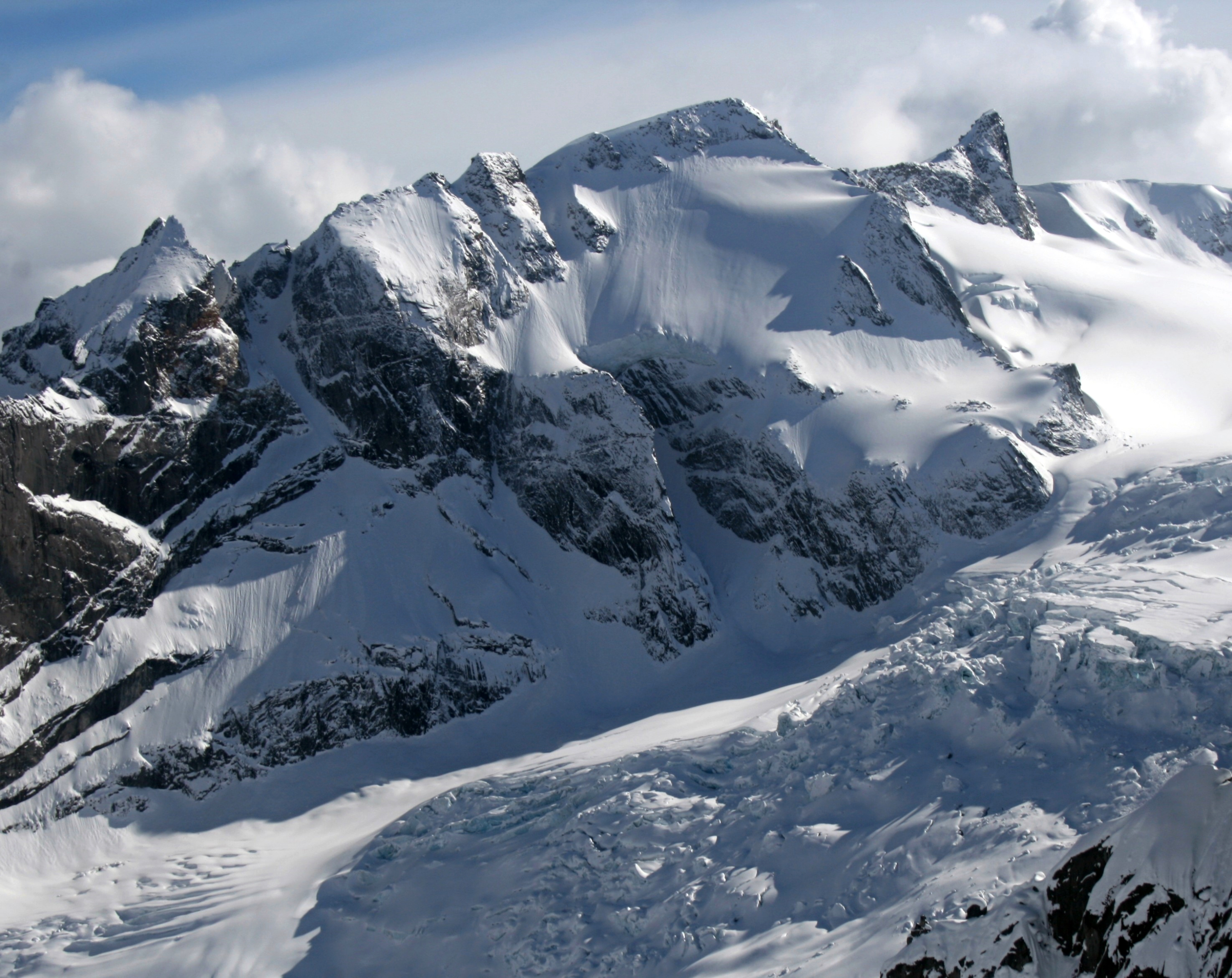
North aspect

== See also ==
- Geography of British Columbia
