= Doubletop Mountain (British Columbia) =

Mountain in British Columbia, Canada

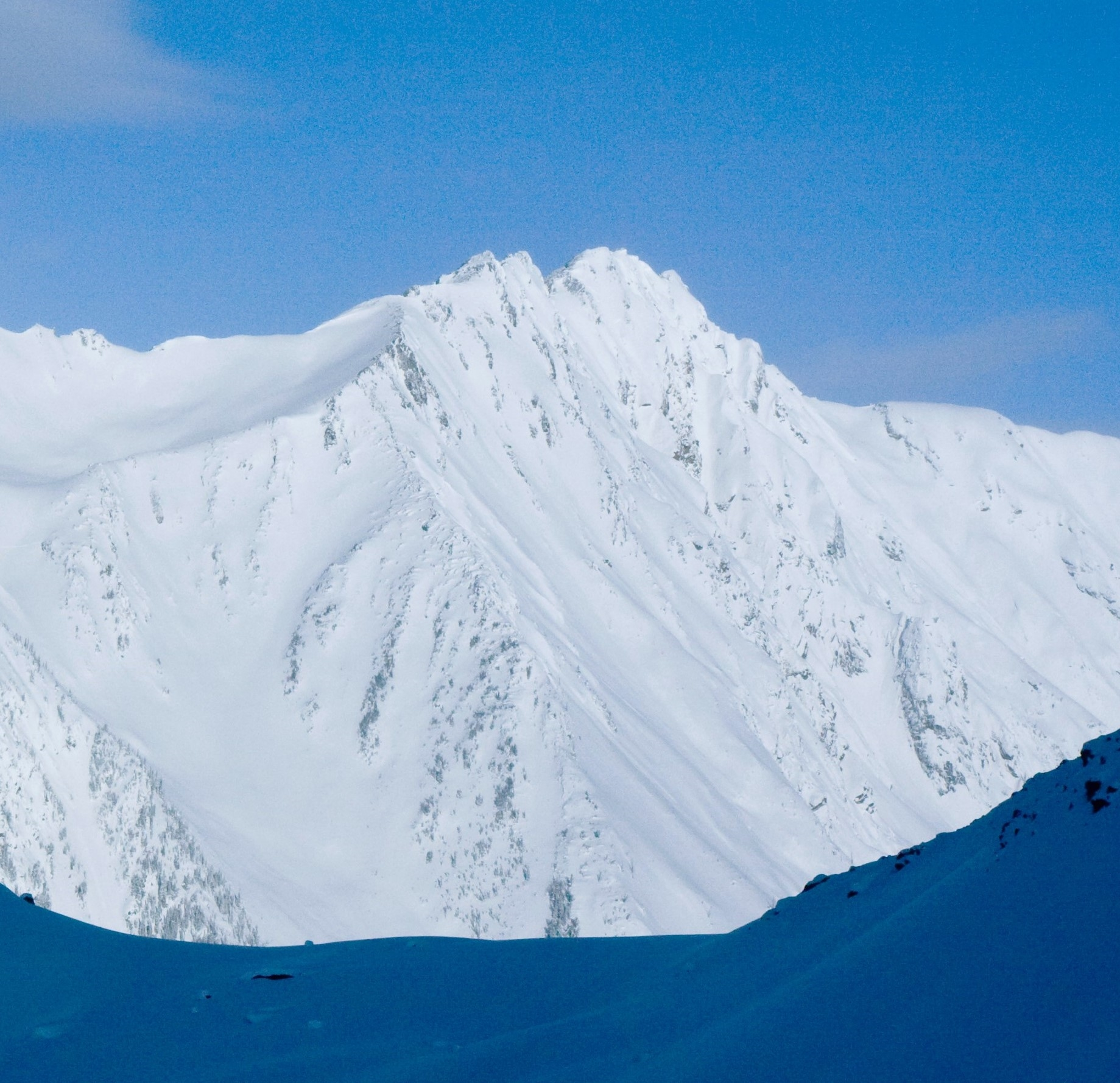
- South aspect

Highest point
- Elevation: 2,667 m (8,750 ft)
- Prominence: 164 m (538 ft)
- Parent peak: Adamant Mountain (3,345 m)
- Isolation: 1.3 km (0.81 mi)
- Listing: Mountains of British Columbia
- Coordinates: 51°47′37″N 117°52′50″W

Geography
- Location within British Columbia Location within Canada
- Interactive map of Doubletop Mountain
- Country: Canada
- Province: British Columbia
- District: Kootenay Land District
- Parent range: Adamant Range; Selkirk Mountains
- Topo map: NTS 82N13 Sullivan River

Doubletop Mountain is a 2,667-metre (8,750-foot) mountain in British Columbia, Canada.

== Description ==
Doubletop Mountain is part of the Adamant Range which is a subrange of the Selkirk Mountains. It is located 84 km (52 mi) northwest of Golden along the west side of the Rocky Mountain Trench. Precipitation runoff and glacial meltwater from the mountain drains to Kinbasket Lake via Swan and Double Eddy creeks. Topographic relief is significant as the summit rises 1,367 metres (4,485 ft) above Double Eddy Creek in 2 km (1.2 mi) and 1,367 metres (4,485 ft) above Swan Creek in 2.5 km (1.6 mi). Doubletop Mountain is located immediately north of the Bill Putnam hut which is one of Canada's best ski mountaineering destinations. The mountain's toponym was officially adopted on March 4, 1965, by the Geographical Names Board of Canada.

== Climate ==
Based on the Köppen climate classification, Doubletop Mountain is located in a subarctic climate zone with cold, snowy winters, and mild summers. Winter temperatures can drop below −20 °C with wind chill factors below −30 °C.

== See also ==
- Geography of British Columbia
