= Downie Peak =

Mountain summit in British Columbia, Canada

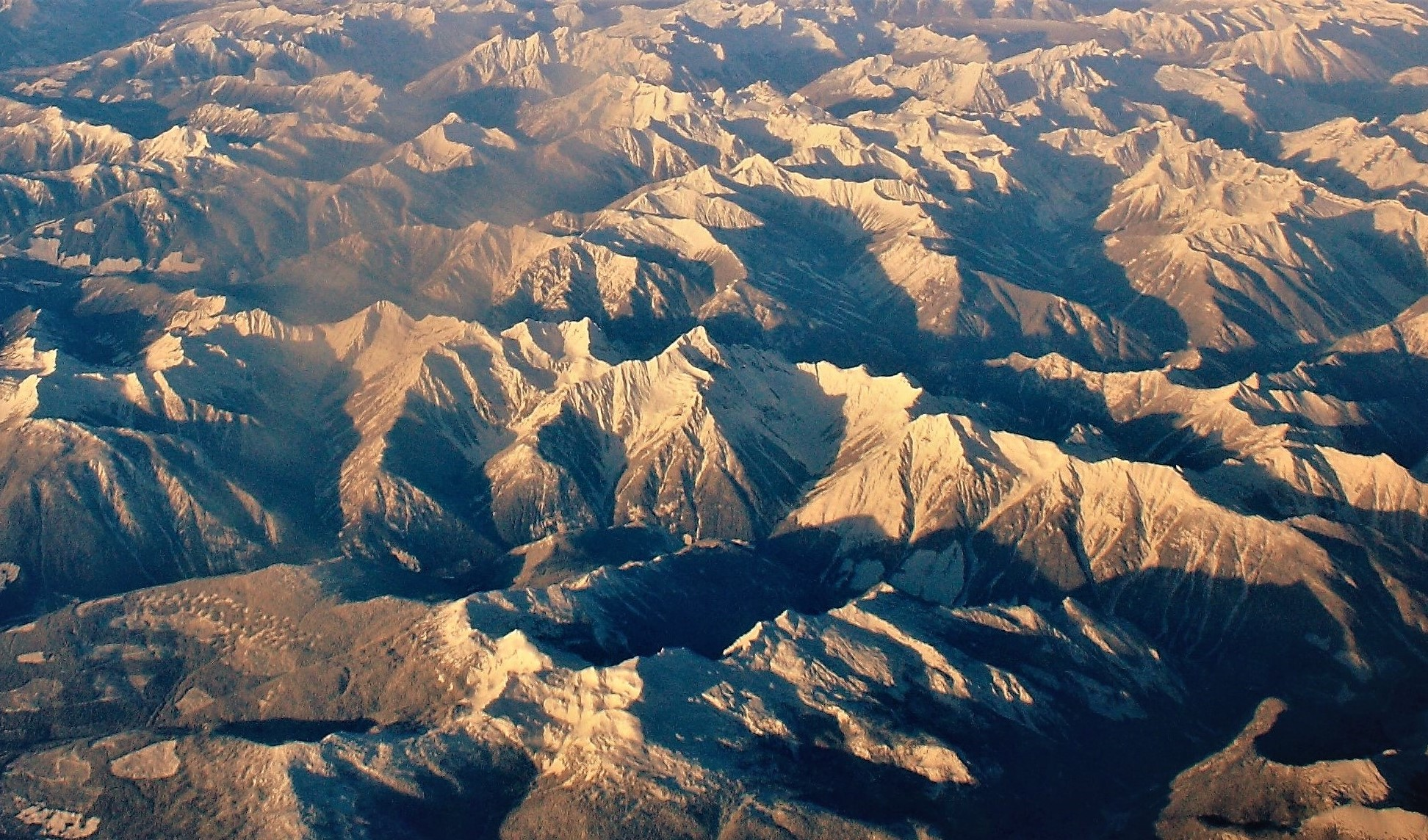
- South aspect, centered

Highest point
- Elevation: 2,926 m (9,600 ft)
- Prominence: 924 m (3,031 ft)
- Parent peak: Iconoclast Mountain (3,228 m)
- Isolation: 25.4 km (15.8 mi)
- Listing: Mountains of British Columbia
- Coordinates: 51°33′31″N 118°18′08″W

Naming
- Etymology: William Downie

Geography
- Location within British Columbia Location within Canada
- Interactive map of Downie Peak
- Country: Canada
- Province: British Columbia
- District: Kootenay Land District
- Parent range: Selkirk Mountains; Big Bend Ranges
- Topo map: NTS 82M9 Goldstream River

Geology
- Rock age: Cambrian
- Mountain type: Fault block
- Rock type(s): Phyllite, Limestone

Climbing
- First ascent: 1959 by William L. Putnam

Downie Peak is a 2,926-metre (9,600 ft) mountain summit located in British Columbia, Canada.

== Description ==
Part of the Selkirk Mountains, Downie Peak is situated 60 kilometres (37 mi) north of Revelstoke and 15 kilometres (9.3 mi) east of Lake Revelstoke. Prominently visible from nearly every peak in the Northern Selkirks.

== History ==
The peak was named by Walter Moberly after William Downie (1819–1893), a gold prospector employed by Sir James Douglas. It was labelled on a 1915 reconnaissance map of the Northern Selkirk Mountains; prior to then it was labelled "Eldorado Peak" on earlier maps. The mountain's toponym was officially adopted March 31, 1924, by the Geographical Names Board of Canada.

The first ascent of the summit was made July 14, 1959, by William L. Putnam, W. V. Graham Matthews and David Michael via the southwest ridge. The second successful ascent wasn't accomplished until 1991.

== Climate ==
Based on the Köppen climate classification, Downie Peak is located in a subarctic climate zone with cold, snowy winters, and mild summers.

== See also ==
- Big Bend Country – Section of Columbia River, British Columbia, Canada
- Big Bend Gold Rush – 1860s gold rush in British Columbia
- Downieville, California
- Geography of British Columbia
