= Sandford Fleming =

Scottish-Canadian engineer and inventor (1827–1915)

Sir Sandford Fleming KCMG FRSC
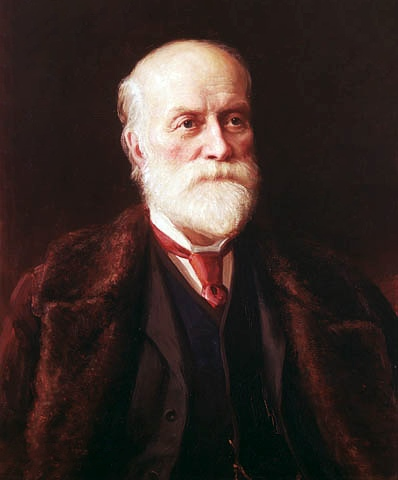
- Portrait of Sir Sandford Fleming by John Wycliffe Lowes Forster
- Born: January 7, 1827; Kirkcaldy, Scotland
- Died: July 22, 1915 (aged 88); Halifax, Nova Scotia, Canada
- Occupations: engineer and inventor
- Military Service
- Allegiance: Province of Canada
- Branch: Canadian Militia
- Service years: 1862–1865
- Rank: Captain
- Unit: 10th Volunteer Battalion of Rifles
- Known for: Inventing, most notably standard time

Sir Sandford Fleming (January 7, 1827 – July 22, 1915) was a Scottish engineer and inventor. Born and raised in Scotland, he immigrated to colonial Canada at the age of 18. He promoted worldwide standard time zones, a prime meridian, and use of the 24-hour clock as key elements to communicating the accurate time, all of which influenced the creation of Coordinated Universal Time. He designed Canada's first postage stamp, produced a great deal of work in the fields of land surveying and map making, engineered much of the Intercolonial Railway and the first several hundred kilometers of the Canadian Pacific Railway, and was a founding member of the Royal Society of Canada and founder of the Canadian Institute (a science organization in Toronto).

== Early life ==
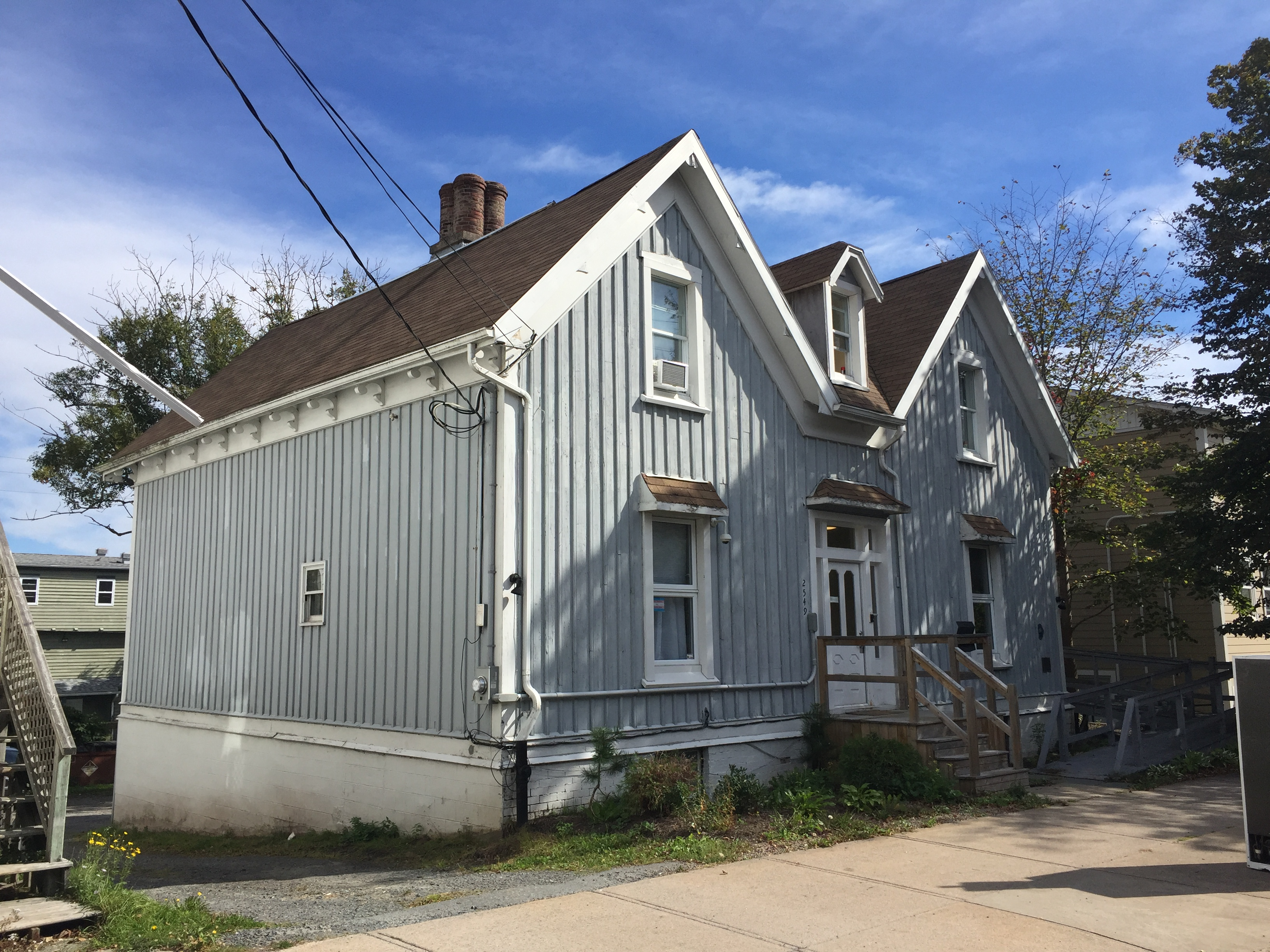
Sir Sandford Fleming House (1866–1871), Brunswick Street, Halifax, Nova Scotia

In 1827, Fleming was born in Kirkcaldy, Fife, Scotland to Andrew and Elizabeth Fleming. At the age of 14 he was apprenticed as a surveyor and in 1845, at the age of 18, he emigrated with his older brother David to the Province of Canada (today's southern portions of Ontario and Quebec). Their route took them through many cities of the Canadian colonies: Quebec City, Montreal, and Kingston, before settling in Peterborough with their cousins two years later in 1847. He qualified as a surveyor in Canada in 1849.

In 1849 he created the Royal Canadian Institute with several friends, which was formally incorporated on November 4, 1851. Although initially intended as a professional institute for surveyors and engineers it became a more general scientific society. In 1851 he designed the Threepenny Beaver, the first Canadian postage stamp, for the Province of Canada. Throughout this time he was fully employed as a surveyor, mostly for the Grand Trunk Railway. His work for them eventually gained him the position as Chief Engineer of the Northern Railway of Canada in 1855, where he advocated the construction of iron bridges instead of wood for safety reasons.

Fleming served in the 10th Battalion Volunteer Rifles of Canada (later known as the Royal Regiment of Canada) and was commissioned to the rank of captain on January 1, 1862. He retired from the militia in 1865.

== Family ==
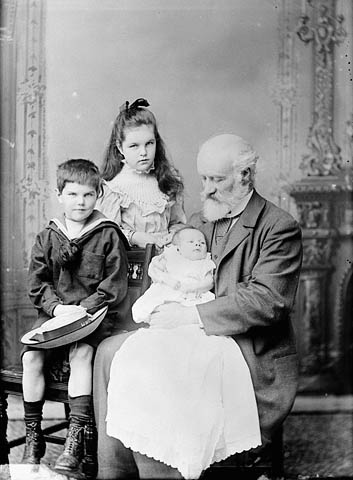
Fleming with his grandchildren in 1893

As soon as he arrived in Peterborough, Ontario in 1845, Fleming became friendly with the family of his future wife, the Halls, and was attracted to Ann Jane (Jeanie) Hall. However, it was not until a sleigh accident almost ten years later that the young people's love for each other was revealed. A year after this incident, in January 1855, Sandford married Ann Jane (Jean) Hall, daughter of Sheriff James Hall. They were to have nine children of whom two died young. The oldest son, Frank Andrew, accompanied Fleming in his great Western expedition of 1872. A family man, deeply attached to his wife and children, he also welcomed his father Andrew Greig Fleming, Andrew's wife and six of their other children who came to join him in Canada two years after his arrival. The Fleming and Hall families saw each other often.

After the death of his wife Jeanie in 1888, Fleming's niece Miss Elsie Smith, daughter of Alexander and Lily Smith, of Kingussie, Scotland, presided over his household at "Winterholme" 213 Chapel Street, Ottawa, Ontario.

== Railway engineer ==
His time at the Northern Railway was marked by conflict with the architect Frederick William Cumberland, with whom he started the Canadian Institute and who was general manager of the railway until 1855. Starting as assistant engineer in 1852, Fleming replaced Cumberland in 1855 but was in turn ousted by him in 1862. In 1863 he became the chief government surveyor of Nova Scotia charged with the construction of a line from Truro to Pictou. When he would not accept the tenders from contractors that he considered too high, he was asked to bid for the work himself and completed the line by 1867 with both savings for the government and profit for himself.

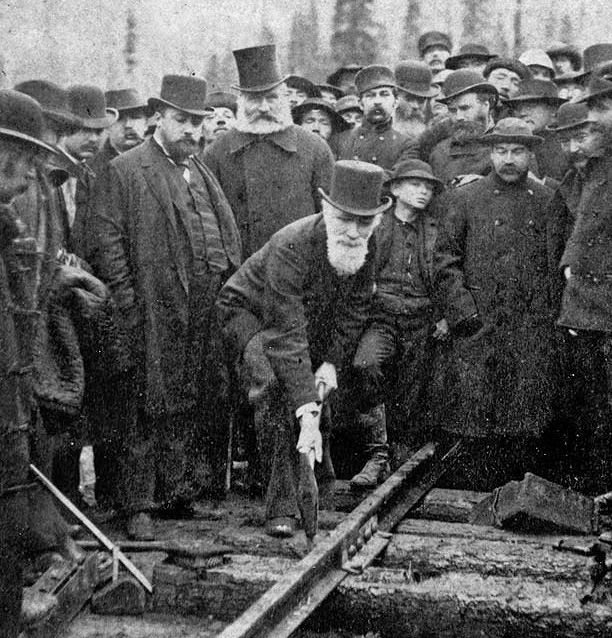
Sandford Fleming (in tallest hat) at the ceremony of the "last spike" being driven on the Canadian Pacific Railway

In 1862 he placed before the government a plan for a transcontinental railway connecting the Atlantic and Pacific oceans. The first part, between Halifax and Quebec became an important part of the preconditions for New Brunswick and Nova Scotia to join the Canadian Federation because of the uncertainties of travel through Maine because of the American Civil War. In 1867 he was appointed engineer-in-chief of the Intercolonial Railway which became a federal project and he continued in this post until 1876. His insistence on building the bridges of iron and stone instead of wood was controversial at the time, but was soon vindicated by their resistance to fire.

Between 1870 and 1875 Fleming supervised the building of several parts of the Intercolonial railway being built by Brown, Brooks & Ryan, a Toronto firm established by railway magnate Hugh Ryan. These sections were particularly costly due to the difficult terrain and included two bridges over the Miramichi River and six miles of approaches.

By 1871, the strategy of a railway connection was being used to bring British Columbia into federation and Fleming was offered the chief engineer post on the Canadian Pacific Survey. Although he hesitated because of the amount of work he had, in 1872 he set off with a small party to survey the route, particularly through the Rocky Mountains, finding a practicable route through the Yellowhead Pass. One of his companions, George Monro Grant wrote an account of the trip, which became a best-seller. In June 1880, Fleming was dismissed by Sir Charles Tupper, with a $30,000 payoff. It was the hardest blow of Fleming's life, though he obtained a promise of monopoly, later revoked, on his next project, a trans-pacific telegraph cable. Nevertheless, in 1884 he became a director of the Canadian Pacific Railway and was present as the last spike was driven.

== Inventor of worldwide standard time ==
The Toronto site where Fleming first proposed standard time is marked by a provincial plaque

Fleming is credited with "the initial effort that led to the adoption of the present time meridians". After missing a train while travelling in Ireland because a printed schedule listed p.m. instead of a.m., in 1876 he wrote a memoir "Terrestrial Time" where he proposed a single 24-hour clock for the entire world, conceptually located at the centre of the Earth and not linked to any surface meridian. He later called this time "Cosmopolitan time" and later still "Cosmic Time".

He also proposed 24 time zones, each an hour wide or 15 degrees of longitude. The zones were labelled A-Y, excluding J, and arbitrarily linked to the Greenwich meridian, which was designated G. All clocks within each zone would be set to the same time as the others, and between zones the alphabetic labels could be used as common notation. So for example cosmopolitan time G:45 would map to local time 14:45 in one zone and 15:45 in the next.

In two papers "Time reckoning" and "Longitude and Time Reckoning" presented at a meeting of the Canadian Institute in Toronto on February 8, 1879, Fleming revised his system to link with the anti-meridian of Greenwich (the 180th meridian). He suggested that a prime meridian be chosen and analyzed shipping numbers to suggest Greenwich as the meridian. Fleming's two papers were considered so important that in June 1879 the British Government forwarded copies to eighteen foreign countries and to various scientific bodies in England.

Fleming went on to advocate his system at several major international conferences including the Geographical Congress at Venice in 1881, a meeting of the Geodetic Association at Rome in 1883, and the International Meridian Conference of 1884. The International Meridian Conference accepted the Greenwich Meridian and a universal day of 24 hours beginning at Greenwich midnight. However, the conference's resolution specified that the universal day "shall not interfere with the use of local or standard time where desirable". The conference also refused to accept his zones, stating that they were a local issue outside its purview.

Fleming authored the pamphlet "Time-Reckoning for the 20th Century", published by the Smithsonian Institution in its annual report for 1886.

By 1929, all major countries in the world had accepted time zones. In the present day, UTC offsets divide the world into zones, and military time zones assign letters to 24 hourly zones, similar to Fleming's system.

Fleming was also interested in global calendar reform. He met Moses B. Cotsworth in 1908 when Cotsworth visited Ottawa. They discussed the International Fixed Calendar over lunch and Fleming agreed to present Cotsworth's paper on his 13-month calendar to the Royal Society of Canada. Fleming maintained a close friendship with Cotsworth and they often corresponded by letter. Fleming became the president of the International Fixed Almanak Reform League which, in 1922, became the International Fixed Calendar League. He supported the campaign until his death. Cotsworth later wrote The Greatest Canadian as a tribute to Fleming.

== Later life ==
When the railway privatization instituted by Tupper in 1880 forced him out of a job with government, he retired from the world of surveying, and took the position of Chancellor of Queen's University in Kingston, Ontario. He held this position for his last 35 years, where his former Minister George Monro Grant was principal from 1877 until Grant's death in 1902. Not content to leave well enough alone, he tirelessly advocated the construction of a submarine telegraph cable connecting all of the British Empire, the All Red Line, which was completed in 1902.

Being a man of ideas, in 1882 he authored a book on the land policy of the HBC.

He also kept up with business ventures, becoming in 1882 one of the founding owners of the Nova Scotia Cotton Manufacturing Company in Halifax. He was a member of the North British Society. He also helped found the Western Canada Cement and Coal Company, which spawned the company town of Exshaw, Alberta. In 1910, this business was captured in a hostile take-over by stock manipulators acting under the name Canada Cement Company, an action which Fleming took as a personal blow.

In 1880 he served as the vice president of the Ottawa Horticultural Society. In 1888, he became the first president of the Rideau Curling Club, after leaving the Ottawa Curling Club in protest of its temperance policy.

In early 1890s he turned his attention to electoral reform and the need for proportional representation. He authored two books on the subject "An Appeal to the Canadian Institute on the Rectification of Parliament" (1892) and "Essays on the Rectification of Parliament" (1893), which included an essay by Australian reformer Catherine Helen Spence.

He became a strong advocate of a telecommunications cable from Canada to Australia, which he believed would become a vital communications link of the British Empire. The Pacific Cable was successfully laid in 1902. He authored the book "Canada and British Imperial Cables" in 1900.

His accomplishments were well known worldwide, and in 1897 he was knighted by Queen Victoria. He was a freemason, having joined St Andrew's Lodge No 1 [Now No 16] in York [now Toronto].

In 1883, while surveying the route of the Canadian Pacific Railway with George Monro Grant, he met Major A. B. Rogers near the summit of Rogers Pass (British Columbia) and co-founded the first "Alpine Club of Canada". That early alpine club was short-lived, but in 1906 the modern Alpine Club of Canada was founded in Winnipeg, and the by then Sir Sandford Fleming became the club's first Patron and Honorary President.

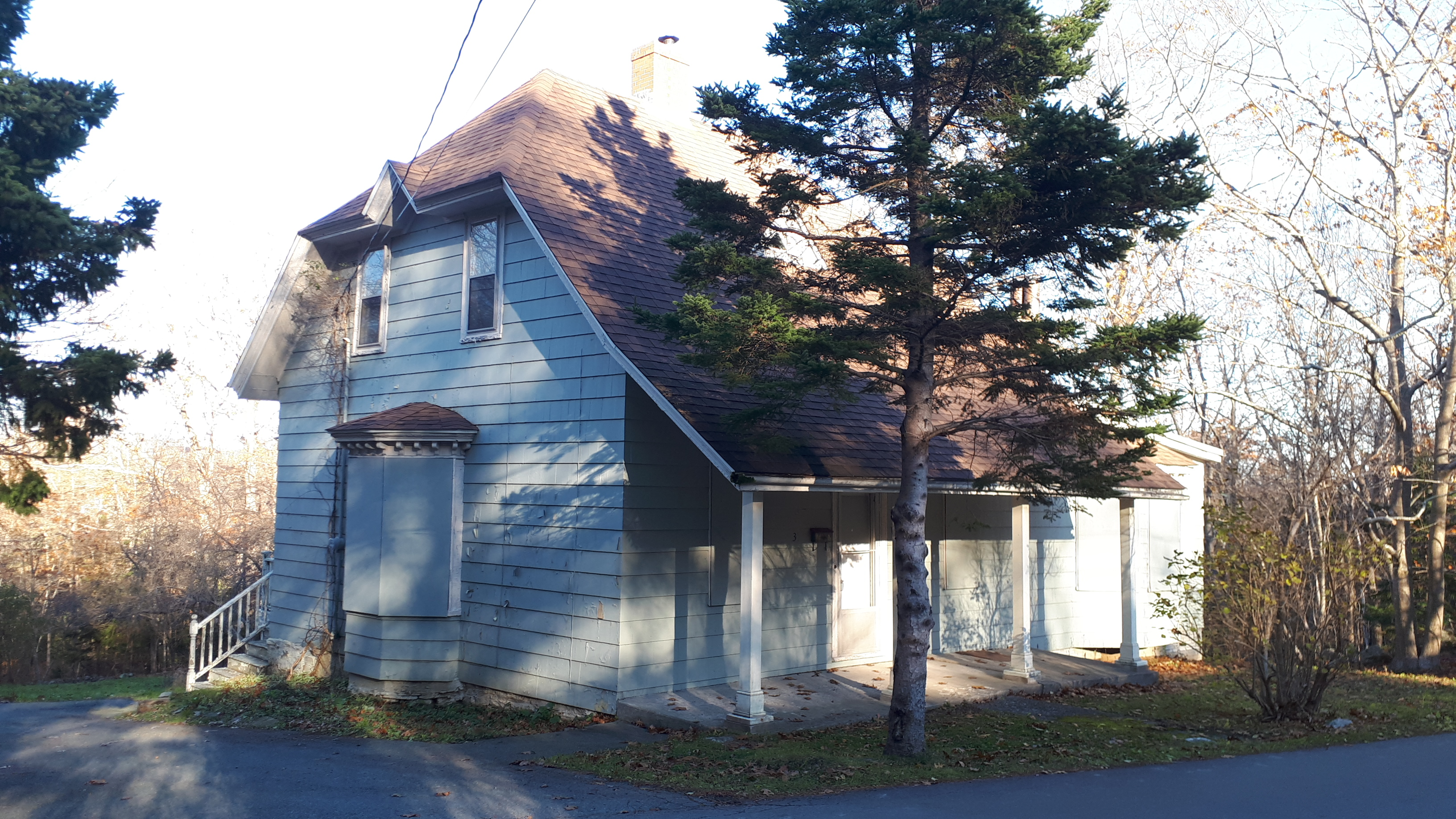
Fleming Cottage, the 1886 summer residence of Sandford Fleming and location of his death in 1915.

In his later years he split his time between Ottawa at his house named "Winterholme" and Halifax where he owned a mansion known as "Blenheim Cottage", but often called "The Lodge" at the corner of Oxford Street and South Street overlooking the Northwest Arm as well as a summer estate across the Arm called "The Dingle" which included the Sandford Fleming Cottage, a small rustic residence he built in 1886. He later deeded the 95 acres (38 hectares) of "the Dingle" to the city, now known as Sir Sandford Fleming Park (Dingle Park). Fleming died at his Dingle summer Cottage while being cared for by his daughter on July 22, 1915. He was buried in Ottawa's Beechwood Cemetery.

== Legacy ==
This federal plaque at Ottawa's Dominion Observatory reflects Fleming's designation as a National Historic Person

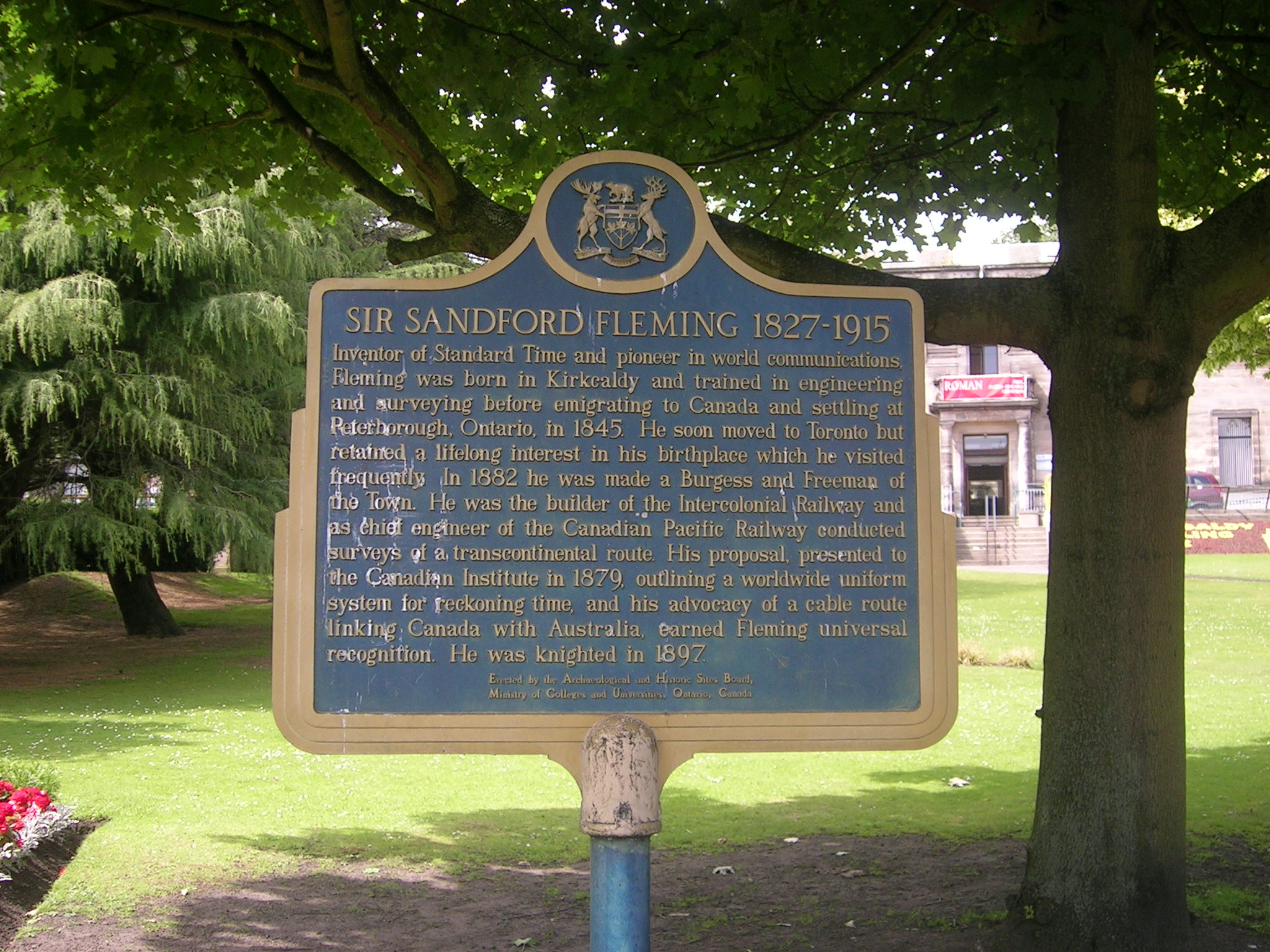
Ontario plaque to Fleming, "Inventor of Standard Time", at War Memorial Gardens, Kirkcaldy, Fife, Scotland

Fleming was designated a National Historic Person in 1950, on the advice of the national Historic Sites and Monuments Board. On January 7, 2017, Google celebrated Sandford Fleming's 190th birthday with a Google Doodle.

In 2025 Fleming was inducted into the Scottish Engineering Hall of Fame

=== Things named after Fleming ===
==== Geographical features ====
- The town of Fleming, Saskatchewan (located on the Canadian Pacific Railway) was named in his honour in 1882.
- Mount Sir Sandford, which is the highest mountain in the Sir Sandford Range of the Selkirk Mountains, and the 12th highest peak in British Columbia, is named after him.
- Sandford Island and Fleming Island in Barkley Sound, British Columbia were named after him.
- Sir Sandford Fleming Park, a 38-hectare (94-acre) Canadian urban park in Halifax, also known as "The Dingle" (as shown above under "Later life").
- Sandford Fleming Avenue, a street in Ottawa, home to the city's main post office.
- Sir Sandford Fleming Drive, a street in Peterborough.
- Sandford Fleming Drive, a street in Collingwood, Ontario.
- Sandford Fleming Drive, a street in Waterloo, Ontario.

==== Buildings and institutions ====
- Fleming Hall was built in his honour at Queen's in 1901, and rebuilt after a fire in 1933. It was the home of the university's Electrical Engineering department.
- In Peterborough, Ontario, Fleming College, a Community College of Applied Arts and Technology bearing his name, was opened in 1967, with additional campuses in Lindsay/Kawartha Lakes, Haliburton, and Cobourg.
- The Sandford Fleming building of the University of Toronto Faculty of Applied Science and Engineering (Sandford Fleming building)
- The Sandford Fleming Foundation is a charitable organization affiliated with the University of Waterloo Faculty of Engineering.
- Sir Sandford Fleming elementary school was built in Vancouver in 1913.
- Sir Sanford Fleming Academy, located in North York, Ontario was built in 1964 and was renamed to John Polanyi Collegiate Institute in 2011.
- Sir Sandford Fleming House, Brunswick Street, Halifax, Fleming's home from 1866 to 1871, now used by a housing and addiction outreach group.
- The Fleming Lodge, home to Fleming from 1872 to 1915, Blenheim Terrace, Halifax.
- Sir Sandford Fleming Cottage, at "the Dingle", Fleming's summer home circa 1886 to 1915 and place of his death, Sir Sandford Fleming Park, Halifax.

==== Memorial ====
- Sandford Fleming is commemorated in the town of his birth, Kirkcaldy, Fife, in Scotland, by an analemmatic sundial located at the northern end of the seafront promenade, unveiled in 2022.

=== Postage stamps ===
Fleming has been honoured on two Canadian postage stamps: one from 1977 features his image and a railroad bridge of Fleming's design; another in 2002 reflects his promotion of the Pacific Cable. In addition, his design of the Three Penny Beaver, the first postage stamp for the Province of Canada (today's southern portions of Ontario and Quebec), has been used on seven stamp issues – in 1851, 1852, 1859, 1951, and 2001.

== Arms ==
Coat of arms of Sandford Fleming
Crest A goat's head erased Argent armed Or. Escutcheon Gules a chevron within a double tressure flory-counter-flory Argent. Motto Let The Deed Shaw

== See also ==
- Sandford Fleming Award

== Archives ==
There is a Sandford Fleming fonds at Library and Archives Canada. Archival reference number is R7666.

Academic offices
Preceded by John Cook	Chancellor of Queen's College/Queen's University; 1880–1915	Succeeded by James Douglas
Professional and academic associations
Preceded by George Lawson	President of the Royal Society of Canada; 1888–1889	Succeeded by Raymond Casgrain
