= Doubletop Mountain =

Doubletop Mountain may refer to:

- Doubletop Mountain (British Columbia)
- Doubletop Mountain (Maine)
- Doubletop Mountain (New York)
