= Pioneer Peak =

Pioneer Peak may refer to:

- Pioneer Peak (Alaska) in Alaska, United States
- Pioneer Peak (British Columbia) in British Columbia, Canada
- Pioneer Peak (Nunavut) in Nunavut, Canada
- Pioneer Peak (Pakistan) in the Karakoram, Pakistan
- Pioneer Peak (Utah) in Utah, United States
