= Austerity Mountain =

Mountain in British Columbia, Canada

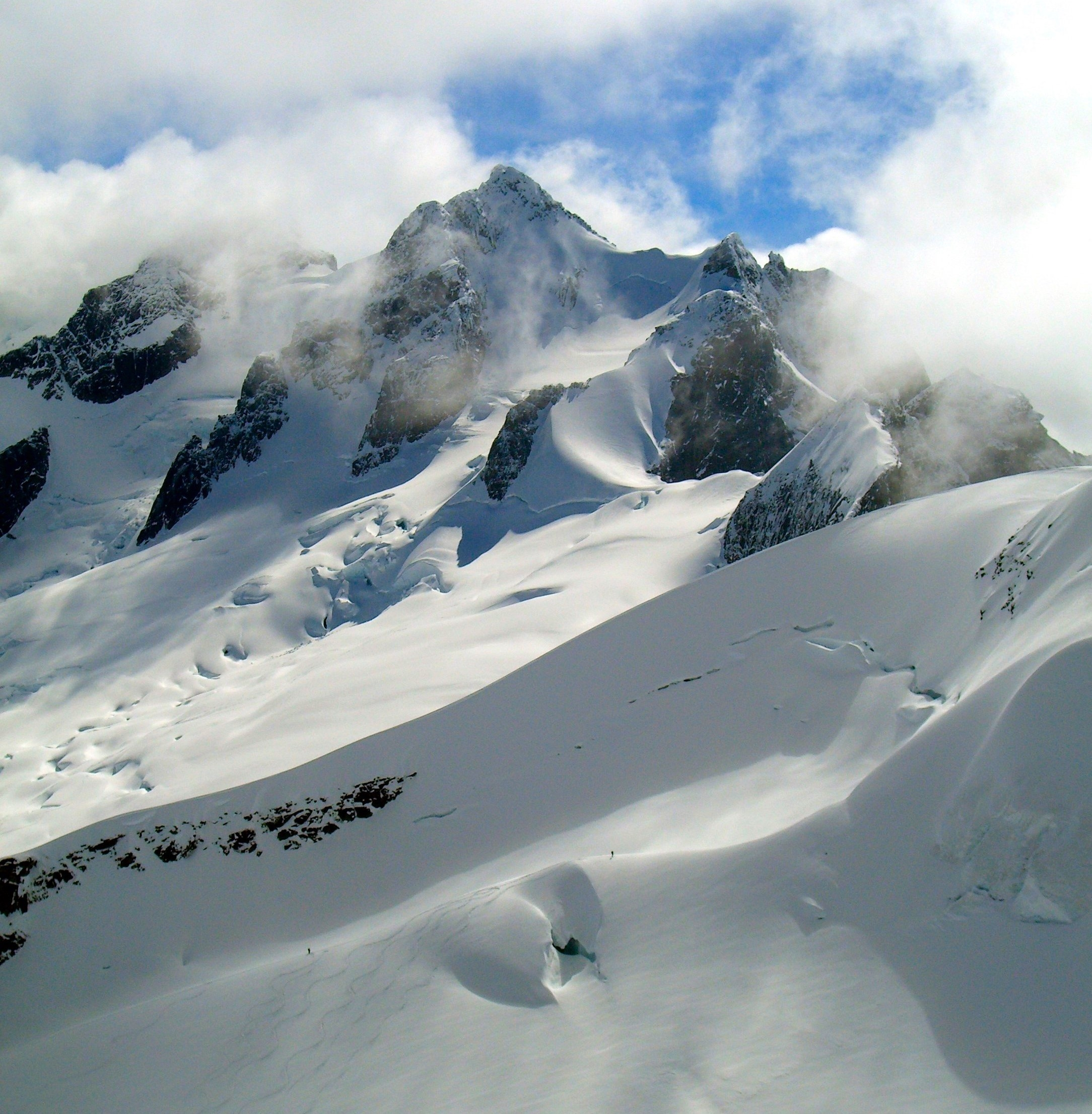
- North-northwest aspect

Highest point
- Elevation: 3,337 m (10,948 ft)
- Prominence: 97 m (318 ft)
- Parent peak: Adamant Mountain (3,345 m)
- Isolation: 0.49 km (0.30 mi)
- Listing: Mountains of British Columbia
- Coordinates: 51°44′04″N 117°54′38″W

Geography
- Location within British Columbia Location within Canada
- Interactive map of Austerity Mountain
- Country: Canada
- Province: British Columbia
- District: Kootenay Land District
- Parent range: Adamant Range; Selkirk Mountains
- Topo map: NTS 82N12 Mount Sir Sandford

Geology
- Rock type: Granite

Climbing
- First ascent: 1911

Austerity Mountain is a 3,337-metre (10,948-foot) mountain in British Columbia, Canada.

== Description ==
Austerity Mountain is the second-highest point of the Adamant Range which is a subrange of the Selkirk Mountains, and it ranks as the fifth-highest peak in the Selkirks. It is located 81 km (50 mi) northwest of Golden and 30 km (19 mi) north of Glacier National Park. Austerity is highly glaciated with the Granite Glacier to the north and Austerity Glacier to the south. Precipitation runoff and glacial meltwater from the mountain's slopes drains into tributaries of the Columbia River. Topographic relief is significant as the summit rises 1,700 metres (5,600 ft) above Austerity Creek in 5 km (3.1 mi) and 2,600 metres (8,500 feet) above Kinbasket Lake in 15 km (9.3 mi).

== History ==
The first ascent of the summit was made on July 20, 1911, by Howard Palmer, Edward Holway, and Frederic King Butters. This first ascent party named the peak "Mount Austerity." Photographs of Austerity appeared in Howard Palmer's 1914 book, "Mountaineering and Explorations in the Selkirks".

The mountain's current toponym was officially adopted on March 31, 1924, by the Geographical Names Board of Canada.

== Climate ==
Based on the Köppen climate classification, Austerity Mountain is located in a subarctic climate zone with cold, snowy winters, and mild summers. Winter temperatures can drop below −20 °C with wind chill factors below −30 °C. This climate supports multiple glaciers surrounding the peak.

== Gallery ==
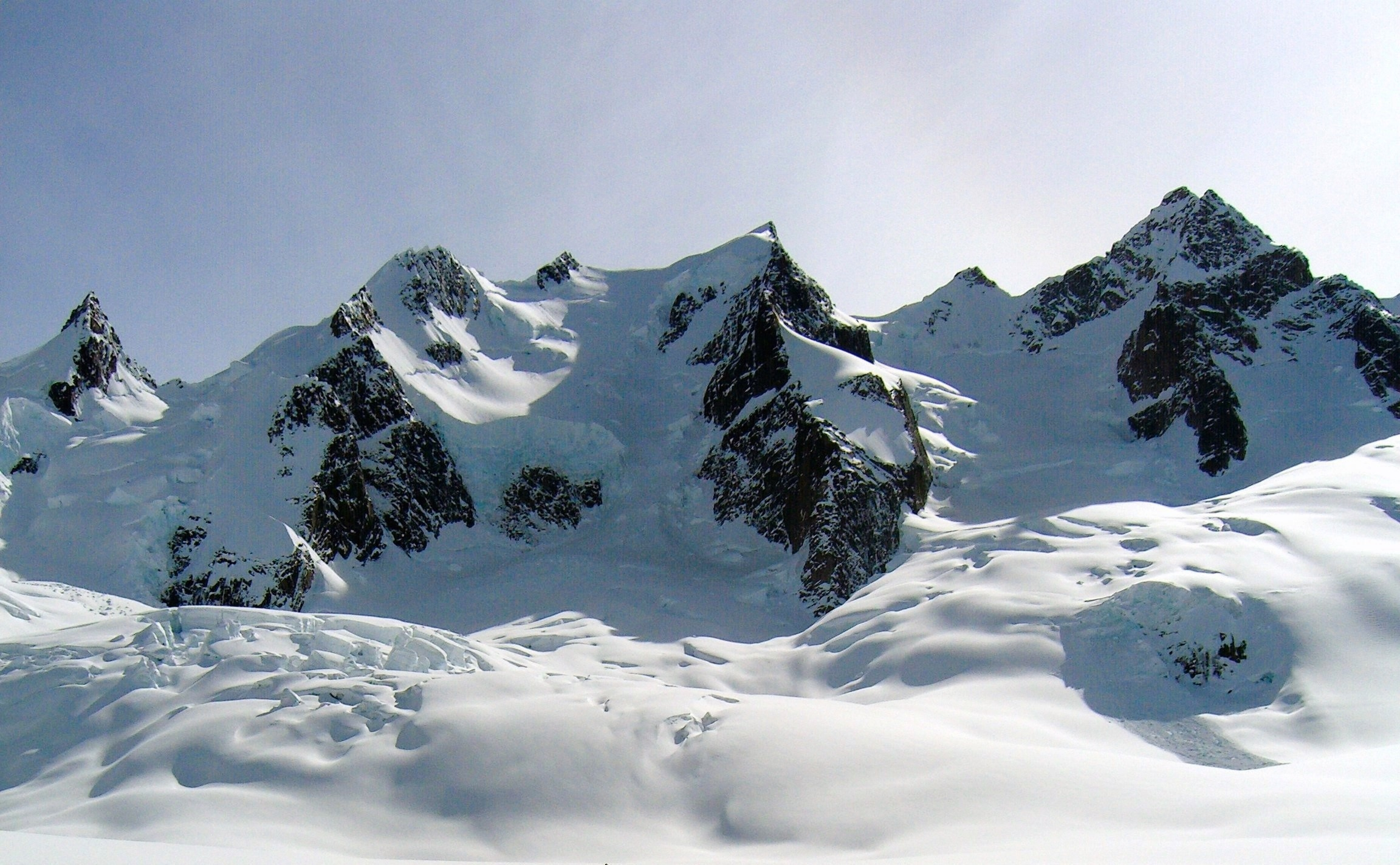
Austerity Mountain to right, with Adamant Mountain centered and The Stickle at far left

== See also ==
- Geography of British Columbia
