= Big Bend Ranges =

Mountain range in British Columbia, Canada

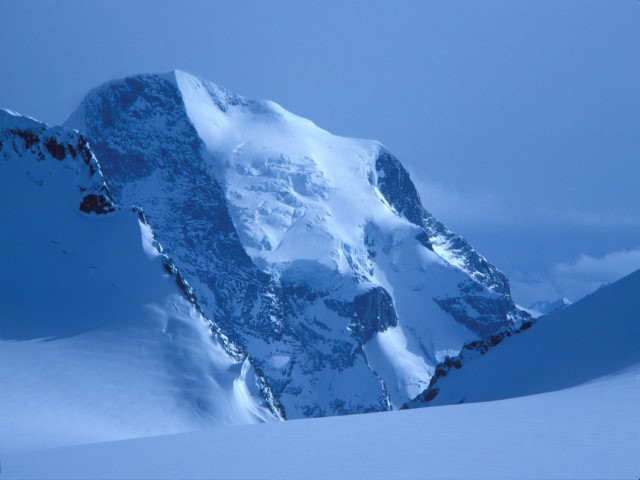
- Mount Sir Sandford from Gothics Glacier

Highest point
- Peak: Mount Sir Sandford
- Elevation: 3,519 m (11,545 ft)
- Coordinates: 51°39′24″N 117°52′03″W

Geography
- Location within British Columbia
- Country: Canada
- Province: British Columbia
- Parent range: Selkirk Mountains

The Big Bend Ranges are a subrange of the Selkirk Mountains of the Columbia Mountains in southeastern British Columbia, Canada, located in Big Bend of the Columbia River north of the Illecillewaet River.

== Sub-ranges ==
- Adamant Range
- Sir Sandford Range
- Windy Range

== Gallery ==
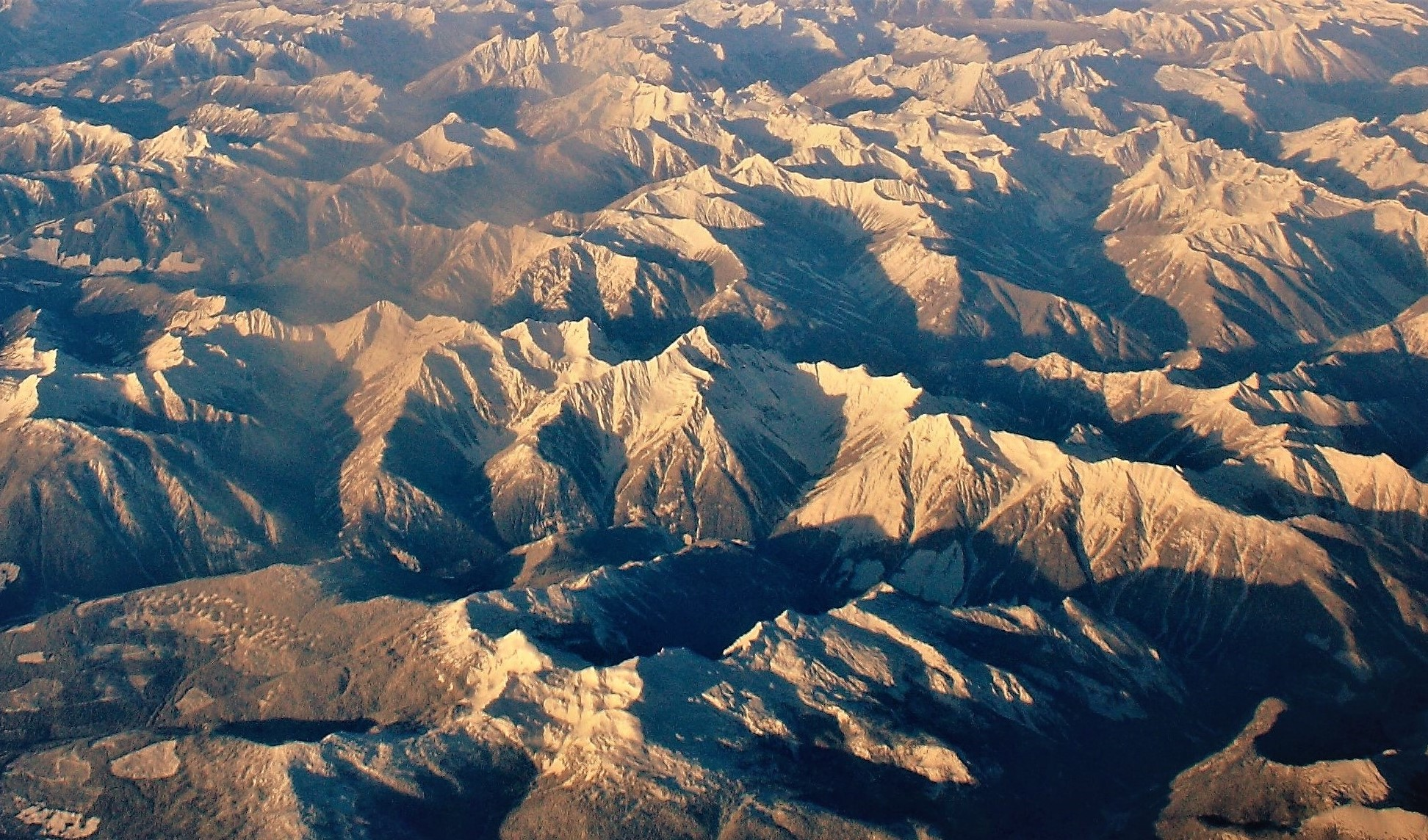
Aerial view of the Big Bend Ranges, camera pointed north, with Downie Peak centered
