= Clachnacudainn Range =

Mountain range in British Columbia, Canada

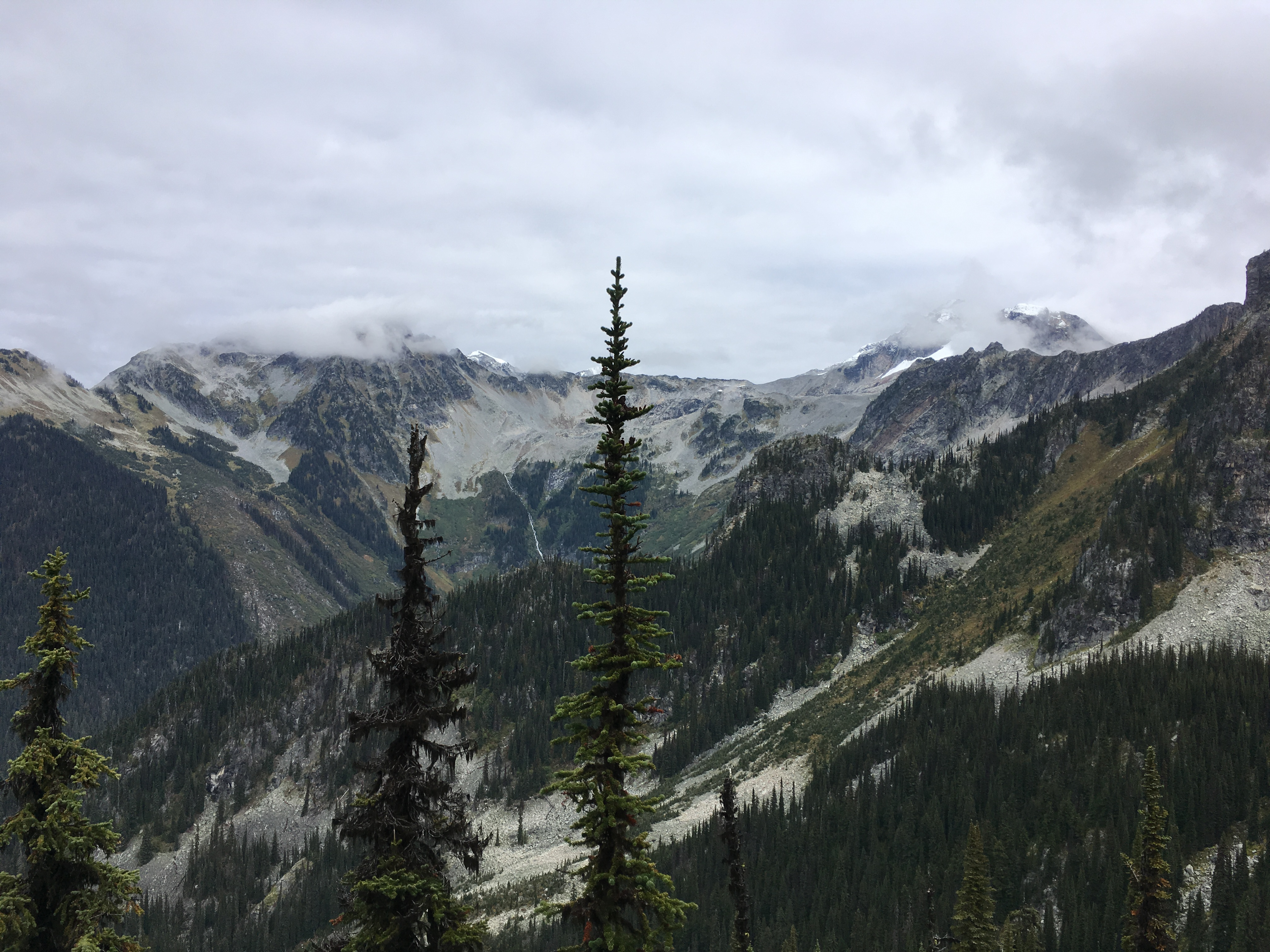
- Mt. Dickey (left) and Mt. Coursier (right) in Mount Revelstoke National Park

Geography
- Location within British Columbia
- Country: Canada
- Province: British Columbia
- Range coordinates: 51°5′N 118°6′W
- Parent range: Selkirk Mountains

The Clachnacudainn Range is a subrange of the Selkirk Mountains in southeastern British Columbia, Canada, located within Mount Revelstoke National Park, just northeast of Revelstoke. It was named by Arthur Wheeler in reference to the Clachnacudainn charter stone, located in Inverness, Scotland. The range is bounded by the Illecillewaet River to the south, Lake Revelstoke to the west, and Carnes and Woolsey Creeks to the north and east. The highest point in the range is Mount Coursier at 2,648 metres (8,688 ft).
