= Windy Range =

Mountain range in British Columbia, Canada

- Location within British Columbia

Highest point
- Peak: Neptune Peak
- Elevation: 3,201 m (10,502 ft)

Geography
- Country: Canada
- Province: British Columbia
- Range coordinates: 51°52′N 118°09′W
- Parent range: Big Bend Ranges
- Topo map: NTS 82M16 Argonaut Mountain

The Windy Range is a subrange of the Big Bend Ranges of the Selkirk Mountains of the Columbia Mountains in southeastern British Columbia, Canada, located on the west side of Columbia Reach, Kinbasket Lake north of Windy Creek.
