= William Lowell Putnam III =

American author and alpinist

William Lowell Putnam III (October 25, 1924 – December 20, 2014) was an alpinist, author and retired broadcasting executive. He was Trustee Emeritus of the Lowell Observatory, a private astronomical research facility. He was the son of politician and businessman Roger Putnam and a member of the prominent Lowell family of Massachusetts.

== Biography ==
Putnam studied geology at Harvard University and later was founder and chief executive of the Springfield Television Corp. (Massachusetts), a company which he sold in 1984. During World War II, he served in 10th Mountain Division, was wounded in combat twice and awarded both the Silver Star and the Bronze Star.

Over several decades beginning in the 1940s, Putnam made many first ascents and difficult exploratory expeditions centered in the Selkirk Mountains of British Columbia.

After serving as the American Alpine Club guidebook editor for western Canada beginning in 1957 and subsequently in other capacities, Putnam was the club's president from 1971 to 1973. Related to these activities, Putnam was U.S. delegate to the International Mountaineering and Climbing Federation (or UIAA) for 30 years, and for much of this period also represented Canada.

The construction of three mountain cabins in western Canada, two of which are operated for the public by the Alpine Club of Canada (Bill Putnam at Fairy Meadows, and The Ben Ferris Great Cairn Hut), the other privately (Battle Abbey), was spearheaded and completed by Putnam. One of these accommodations, in the northern Columbia, or the Selkirk Mountains, was renamed the Bill Putnam Hut in 2002 by the Alpine Club of Canada to recognize his contribution to Canadian mountaineering.

Among his books are A century of American Alpinism, as well as K2: The 1939 Tragedy about the 1939 American Karakoram expedition, and a biography of Swiss-Canadian mountain guide Ed Feuz (the last two together with Andrew J. Kaufman) as well as A Yankee Image: The Life and Times of Roger Lowell Putnam.

In 1953, Putnam founded WWLP (analog/PSIP channel 22, virtual channel 11), the first television station in his hometown of Springfield; his initials formed the basis of the station's callsign. His Springfield Television Corporation bought four more stations before Putnam's retirement in 1984. Putnam ran the station along with his secretary Kathryn "Kitty" (Broman) Putnam, who hosted the popular cooking show "At Home With Kitty" at the station. Putnam and Broman went on to marry after the death of Putnam's first wife, philanthropist and community activist, Joan Putnam (née Fitzgerald; in 1963, Springfield Television purchased Dayton, Ohio station WONE-TV, and changed the callsign to WKEF, derived from Kathryn's maiden name of Kathryn Elizabeth Flynn). Kitty Putnam died on January 5, 2014, at the age of 97.

He served as the sole trustee of Lowell Observatory from 1987 to 2013. During his tenure, the Observatory built the Steele Visitor Center, added the Friends of Lowell membership program, constructed the Lowell Discovery Telescope, and began construction on the Putnam Collection Center.

Putnam died on December 20, 2014, aged 90.
