= Sir Sandford Range =

Mountain range in British Columbia, Canada

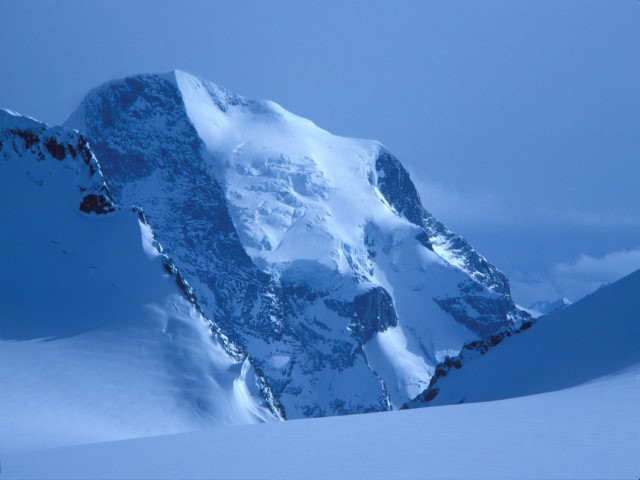
- Mount Sir Sandford from Gothics Glacier

Highest point
- Peak: Mount Sir Sandford
- Elevation: 3,519 m (11,545 ft)

Dimensions
- Area: 260 km^{2} (100 mi^{2})

Geography
- Location within British Columbia
- Country: Canada
- Province: British Columbia
- Range coordinates: 51°39′24″N 117°52′04″W
- Parent range: Big Bend Ranges

The Sir Sandford Range is a subrange of the Big Bend Ranges of the Selkirk Mountains of the Columbia Mountains in southeastern British Columbia, Canada, located between Gold (river) and Palmer Creek just southwest of the Gold Arm of Kinbasket Lake.

The range is named for Sir Sandford Fleming, who was engineer-in-chief of the Canadian Pacific Railway. He was the first to advocate twenty-four-hour day standard time for railways.
