= Bill Putnam hut =

Bill Putnam (Fairy Meadow) hut
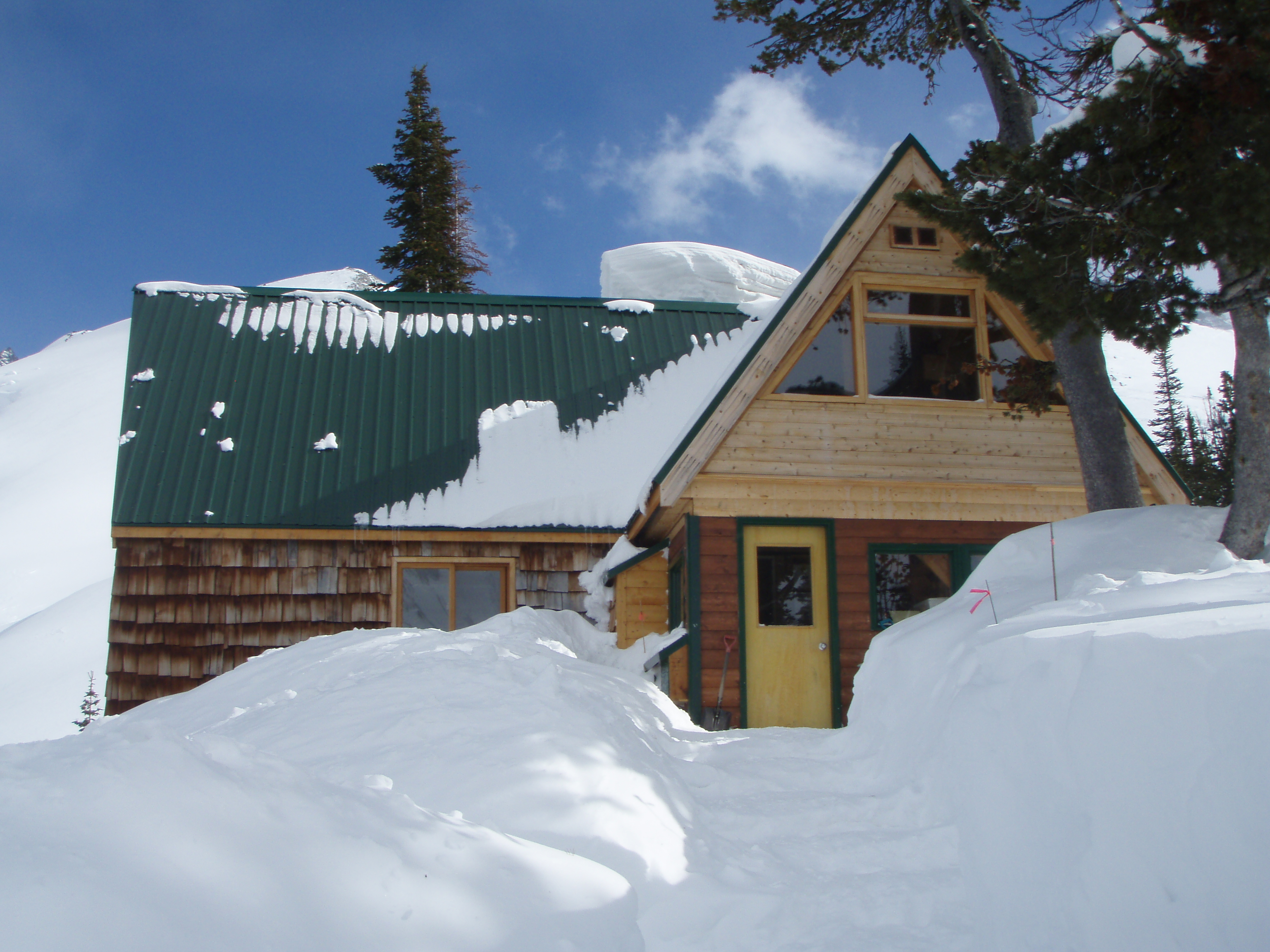
- Interactive map of the Bill Putnam (Fairy Meadow) hut area

General information
- Type: alpine hut
- Architectural style: Log cabin
- Location: near Adamant Range, Canada
- Coordinates: 51°45′48″N 117°52′36″W
- Opened: 1965
- Owner: Alpine Club of Canada

Technical details
- Material: Wood

Design and construction
- Architect: Alpine Club of Canada

Website
- http://www.alpineclubofcanada.ca/facility/fairy.html

The Bill Putnam (Fairy Meadow) hut is an alpine hut located in the Adamant Range of the Selkirk Mountains in British Columbia. It is set on a knoll at the edge of a high mountain meadow and provides access to a great array of mountaineering objectives, but it is best known for its spectacular skiing terrain. The hut is maintained by the Alpine Club of Canada.

== History ==
The hut was built by the Alpine Club of Canada (ACC) in 1965 as a project proposed and largely overseen by noted author and alpinist William Lowell Putnam III who later became president of the American Alpine Club for several years and a long-term board member. In 1973 the hut was renovated and considerably enlarged - a project again largely funded and overseen by Putnam. Since then it has been twice renovated and partly rebuilt. The ACC has held its annual General Mountaineering Camp in the Fairy Meadow area four times since 1981, although the hut was not used for the GMC because it is too small to accommodate all the participants.

Bill Putnam spearheaded the construction of three mountain huts now operated by the Alpine Club of Canada. The Fairy Meadow Hut was renamed the Bill Putnam Hut in 2002 to recognize his contribution. Putnam died on December 20, 2014, at age 90, leaving his legacy behind for Canadian mountaineers to enjoy.

== Access ==
Summer access to the hut is via an estimated 4-7 hour hike up Swan Creek, gaining roughly 1,500 meters in about 8 km, from a trailhead that begins following a drive of 65 km on a logging road along the banks of Lake Kinbasket a portion of the upper Columbia River. This road is sometimes washed out, and is at other times used by fast-moving logging trucks and so discussion with the forestry company, Evans Forest Products in Golden, British Columbia is advisable before starting out. Hiking time on Swan Creek will vary greatly, and may be influenced by significant avalanche debris, heavy brush and other difficulties. Because of this in summer, short helicopter approaches from the logging road are recommended for heavily laden parties to avoid a difficult bush thrash on the undeveloped trail up the creek.

Overland access in winter has occasionally been accomplished, but is difficult due to closure of summer access roads. Normal winter access is via helicopter from a landing pad located near the Trans-Canada Highway 50 km west of Golden. Booking the helicopter well in advance is required, and a satellite phone or VHF radio (or both) is needed for communication with the helicopter company on flight day. Because of serious mountain weather conditions, there is no guarantee that the helicopter can fly on any given day, so bringing a day or two of extra food is recommended in case the helicopter cannot take out people or bring in new supplies.

== Facilities ==
The hut is a two-story building with sleeping area on the upper level and kitchen and living area on the main floor. In summer or winter, it sleeps 20 dormitory-style on foam pads. The main floor divided into a kitchen area and three different living areas and is equipped with propane powered lamps, two propane cook tops, and a propane stove with oven for baking, as well as a wood stove for heating in the winter. The kitchen is well supplied with dishes, cutlery, utensils, pots and pans, and bakeware.

Food storage is in an uninsulated vestibule on the back of the hut, complete with mouse proof storage bins and an unpowered refrigerator. Water is available from a creek 100 metres south of the hut, and a tall flagpole marks the water hole. There are several 20-gallon pails in the hut for gathering water.

There are two separate double sinks in the kitchen. Grey water disposal can usually be dealt with directly down the sinks, which drain into a ground sump, but if the system backs up, guests will have to dig a snow-pit to dispose of it. Non-burnable garbage must be flown out at the end of the camp, but biodegradables, such as food scraps, bones, and paper waste can be burned in the wood stove. There is a large ten-person wood-burning sauna near the main hut. The main supply of wood is located in and around the woodshed by the sauna.

Human waste is dealt with by an outhouse located a short walk behind the hut, but there is a snow-walled urinal located off the trail to the outhouse. Barrels must be flown out by helicopter, so the volume of material put in them should be minimized. Garbage should not be disposed of in the outhouse.

== Activities ==
The hut is known as an excellent base for granite mountaineering and backcountry skiing. It is regularly used by the ACC and various club sections for winter ski camps due to its high snowfall conditions and excellent advanced skiing terrain.

The alpine climbing in the Adamants and Gothics areas around the hut is considered superb, and the hut can provide many summers worth of high quality routes on a dozen or more peaks. Two of these, Adamant and Austerity, are over 11,000 feet (3,400 m).

In winter, the snow tends to extremely large amounts of high-quality powder, providing great ski touring and ski mountaineering opportunities. The terrain is suitable only for strong intermediate to advanced skiers, and beginners should not attempt it.

== Nearby ==
- The Nobility Group
  - Mount Colossal
- The Adamant Group
  - Austerity Mountain
  - Pioneer Peak
- The Gothics Group
  - East Peak
- Gog Pinnacle
- Magog
