= Adamant Mountain =

Mountain in British Columbia, Canada

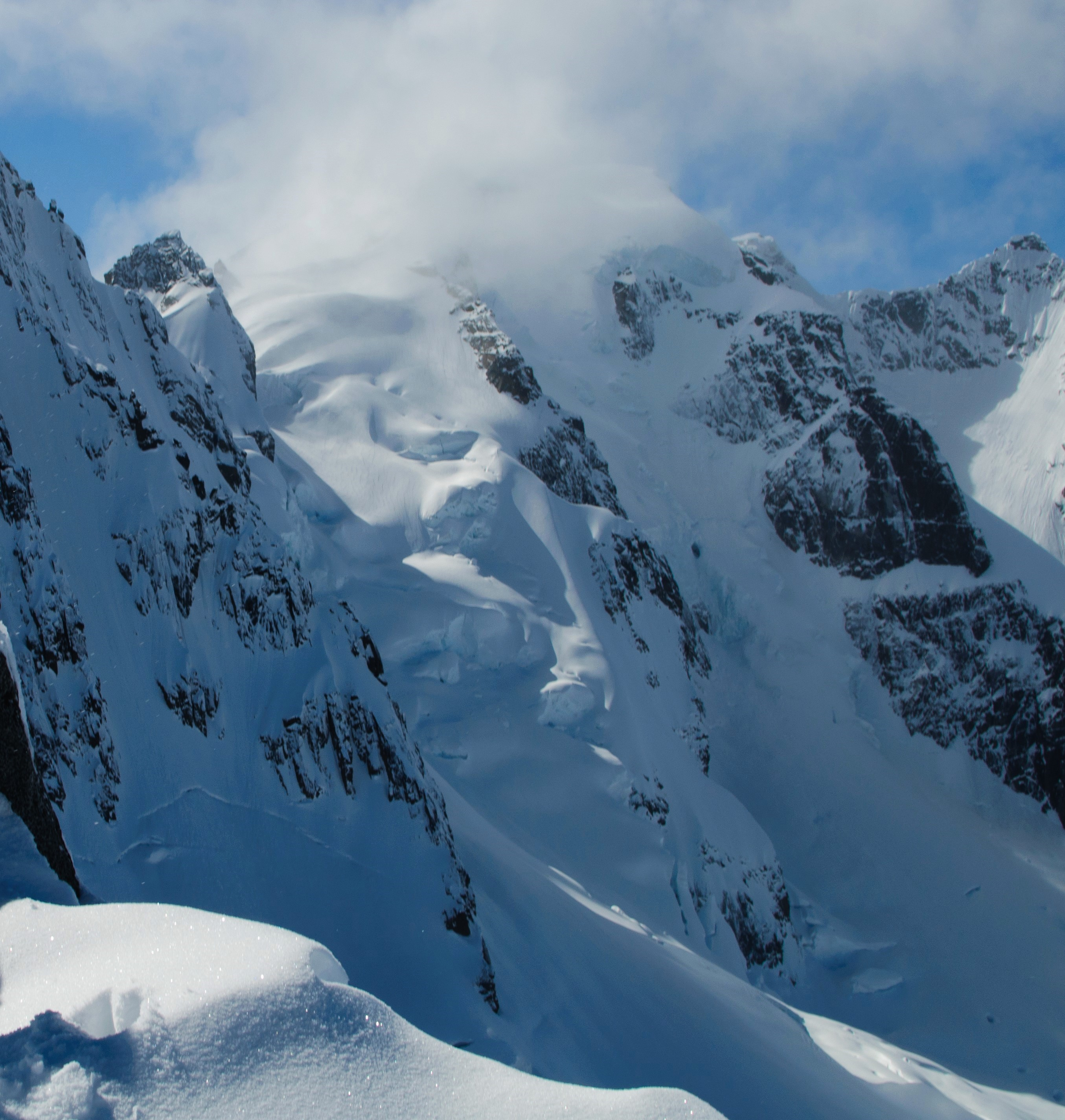
- Northeast aspect, summit shrouded by cloud

Highest point
- Elevation: 3,345 m (10,974 ft)
- Prominence: 915 m (3,002 ft)
- Parent peak: Mount Sir Sandford (3,519 m)
- Isolation: 8.65 km (5.37 mi)
- Listing: Mountains of British Columbia
- Coordinates: 51°43′56″N 117°54′14″W

Naming
- Etymology: Adamant

Geography
- Location within British Columbia Location within Canada
- Interactive map of Adamant Mountain
- Country: Canada
- Province: British Columbia
- District: Kootenay Land District
- Parent range: Adamant Range; Selkirk Mountains
- Topo map: NTS 82N12 Mount Sir Sandford

Geology
- Rock type: Granitic

Climbing
- First ascent: 1912

Adamant Mountain is a 3,345-metre (10,974-foot) mountain in British Columbia, Canada.

== Description ==
Adamant Mountain is the highest point of the Adamant Range which is a subrange of the Selkirk Mountains. It also ranks as the fourth-highest peak in the Selkirks. It is located 81 km (50 mi) northwest of Golden and 30 km (19 mi) north of Glacier National Park. Adamant is highly glaciated with large glaciers radiating in all directions, including the Granite, Adamant, Gothics, and Austerity glaciers. Precipitation runoff and glacial meltwater from the mountain's slopes drains into tributaries of the Columbia River. Topographic relief is significant as the summit rises 1,700 metres (5,577 ft) above Austerity Creek in 5 km (3.1 mi) and 2,600 m (8,530 ft) above Kinbasket Lake in 15 km (9.3 mi). Access to this remote mountain is via helicopter at Golden.

== History ==
The first ascent of the summit was made June 26, 1912, by Howard Palmer, Edward Holway, with guides Rudolph Aemmer and Edward Feuz Jr.

The first ascent of the class 5.7+ South Buttress was made July 31, 1973 by Ted Davis and Budge Gierke. This route was one of Fred Beckey's favorites in North America, which he climbed in 2003.

The mountain's descriptive toponym was officially adopted on March 31, 1924, by the Geographical Names Board of Canada.

== Climate ==
Based on the Köppen climate classification, Adamant Mountain is located in a subarctic climate zone with cold, snowy winters, and mild summers. Winter temperatures can drop below −20 °C with wind chill factors below −30 °C. This climate supports multiple glaciers surrounding the peak. July and August offer the most favorable weather for climbing the mountain.

== Gallery ==
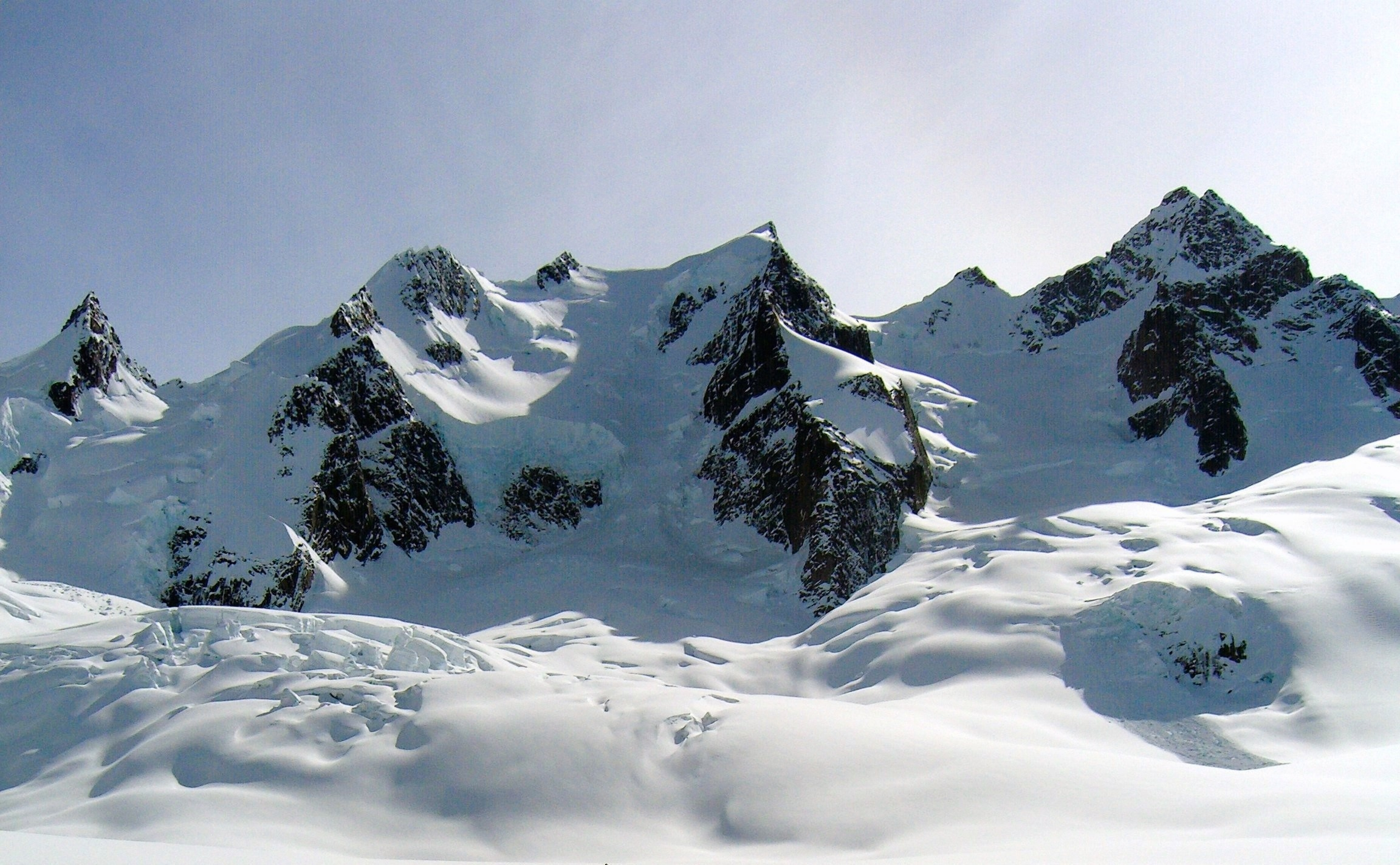
North aspect of Adamant Mountain centered above the Granite Glacier. The Stickle to left, and Austerity Mountain to right.

== See also ==
- Geography of British Columbia
