= Mount Sir Sandford =

Mountain in British Columbia, Canada

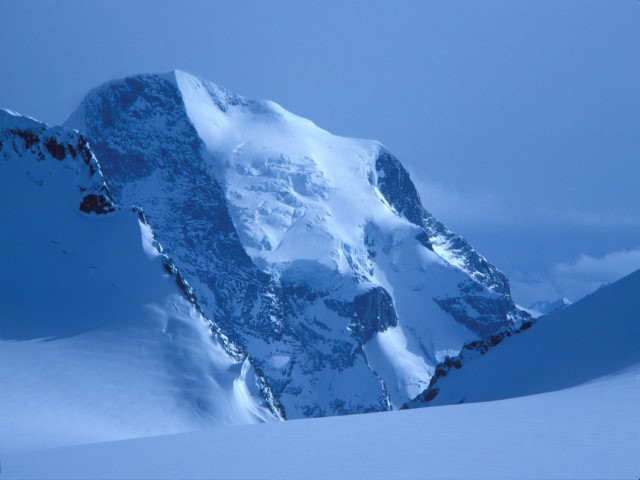
- Mount Sir Sandford from Gothics Glacier

Highest point
- Elevation: 3,519 m (11,545 ft)
- Prominence: 2,707 m (8,881 ft)
- Listing: Mountains of British Columbia; North America prominent peaks 27th; Canada highest major peaks 39th; Canada most prominent peaks 10th
- Coordinates: 51°39′24″N 117°52′04″W

Geography
- Location within British Columbia
- Location: British Columbia, Canada
- District: Kootenay Land District
- Parent range: Sir Sandford Range
- Topo map: NTS 82N12 Mount Sir Sandford

Climbing
- First ascent: 1912
- Easiest route: Remote glacier/ice/rock climb

Mount Sir Sandford is the highest mountain of the Sir Sandford Range and the highest mountain in the Selkirk Mountains of southeastern British Columbia, Canada. It is the 12th highest peak in the province. The mountain was named after Sir Sandford Fleming, a railway engineer for the Canadian Pacific Railway.

The mountain was first summited in 1912 after several attempts in prior years by a party of four, led by Edward W. D. Holway and including Howard Palmer, Edward Feuz Jr. and Rudolph Aemmer.

== See also ==
- Mountain peaks of Canada
- List of mountain peaks of North America
