= Adamant Range =

Mountain range in British Columbia, Canada

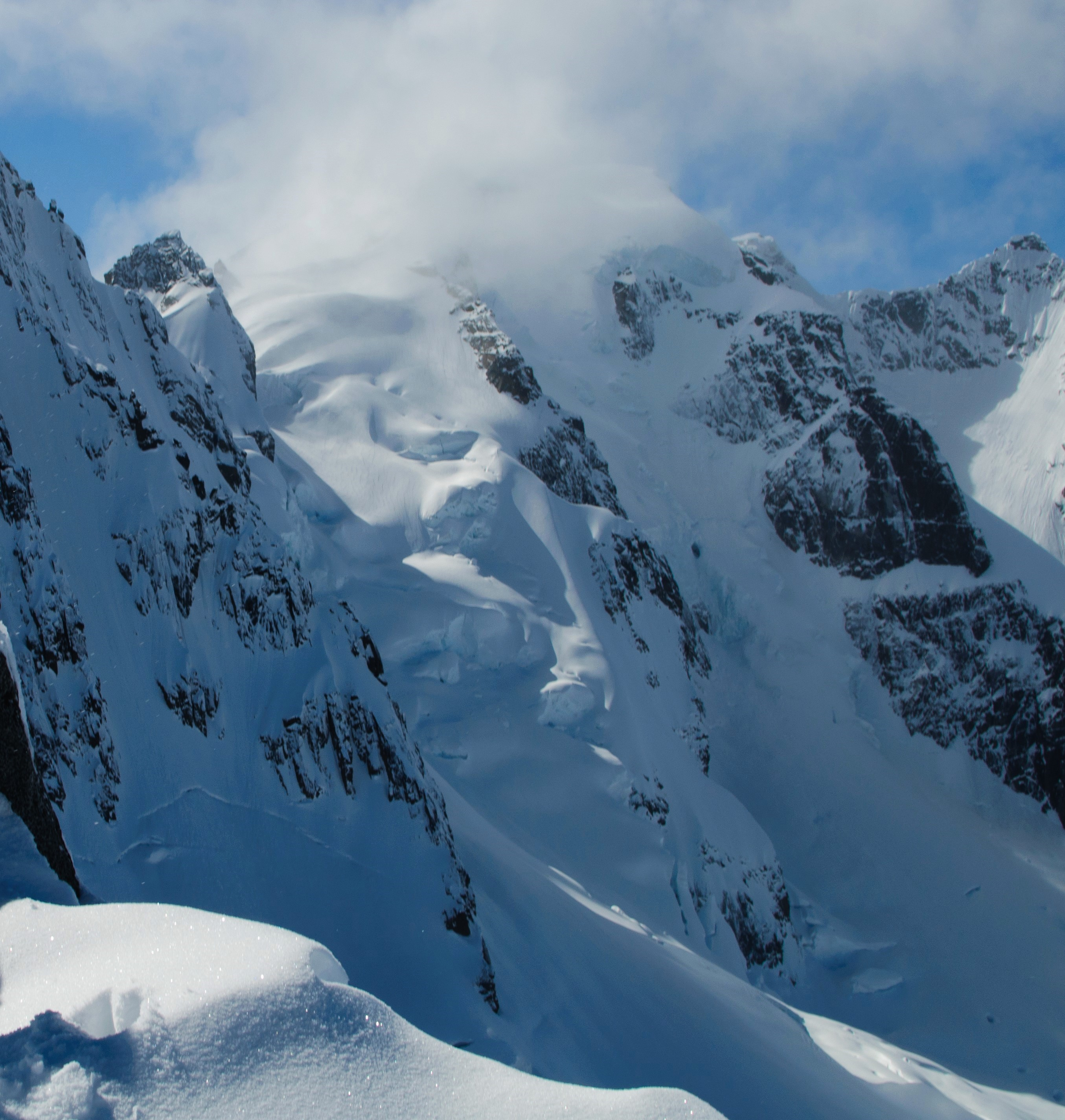
- Adamant Mountain from northeast

Highest point
- Peak: Adamant Mountain
- Elevation: 3,345 m (10,974 ft)
- Coordinates: 51°39′24″N 117°52′03″W

Geography
- Location within British Columbia
- Country: Canada
- Province: British Columbia
- Range coordinates: 51°28′N 117°31′W
- Parent range: Big Bend Ranges

The Adamant Range is a subrange of the Big Bend Ranges of the Selkirk Mountains of the Columbia Mountains in southeastern British Columbia, Canada, located on the west side of Columbia Reach, Kinbasket Lake, north of Glacier National Park.
