= Selkirk Mountains =

Mountain range in the northwestern United States and southwestern Canada

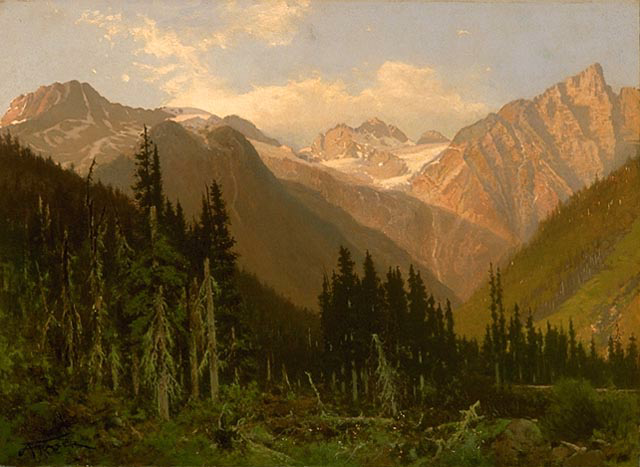
- At the Rogers Pass by John A. Fraser, 1886

Highest point
- Peak: Mount Sir Sandford
- Elevation: 3,519 m (11,545 ft)
- Coordinates: 51°39′24″N 117°52′03″W

Dimensions
- Length: 525 km (326 mi) NS
- Width: 175 km (109 mi) EW

Geography
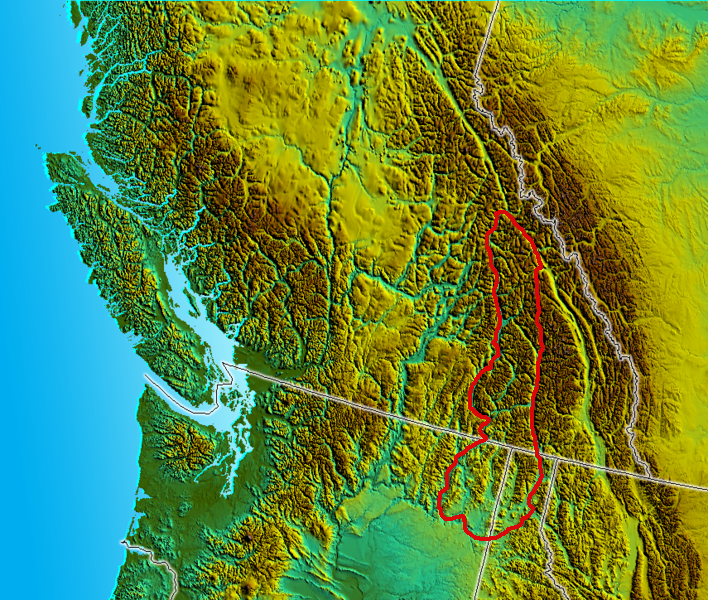
- Location map of the Selkirk Mountains
- Countries: Canada; United States
- Provinces/States: British Columbia; Idaho; Washington
- Range coordinates: 49°57′N 117°23′W
- Parent range: Columbia Mountains
- Borders on: Monashee Mountains; Purcell Mountains; Cariboo Mountains

Geology
- Rock type: Metamorphic rock

The Selkirk Mountains are a mountain range spanning the northern portion of the Idaho Panhandle, eastern Washington, and southeastern British Columbia which are part of a larger grouping of mountains, the Columbia Mountains. They begin at Mica Peak and Krell Hill near Spokane and extend approximately 320 kilometres (200 mi) north from the Canada–United States border to Kinbasket Lake, at the now-deserted location of the onetime fur company post, Boat Encampment. The range is bounded on its west, northeast and at its northern extremity by the Columbia River, or the reservoir lakes now filling most of that river's course. From the Columbia's confluence with the Beaver River, they are bounded on their east by the Purcell Trench, which contains the Beaver River, Duncan River, Duncan Lake, Kootenay Lake and the Kootenay River. The Selkirks are distinct from, and geologically older than, the Rocky Mountains. The neighboring Monashee and Purcell Mountains, and sometimes including the Cariboo Mountains to the northwest, are also part of the larger grouping of mountains known as the Columbia Mountains. A scenic highway loop, the International Selkirk Loop, encircles the southern portions of the mountain range.

The Selkirks were named after Thomas Douglas, 5th Earl of Selkirk.

== Modern history ==
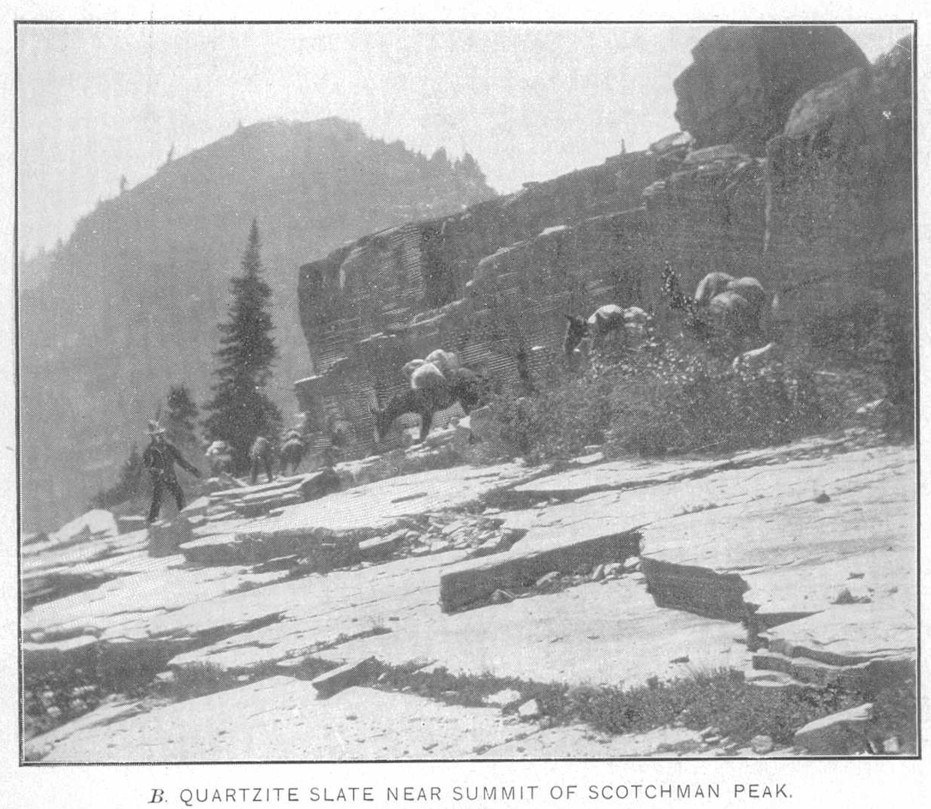
USGS surveyors on Scotchman Peak in 1900

In 1857 gold was discovered in the Selkirks. Coal, copper, marble, mercury, silver, and zinc were also found in the mountains. During the development of Western Canada, the Selkirks presented a formidable barrier to the construction of the Canadian Pacific Railway, until A.B. Rogers discovered the mountain pass that bears his name in 1881–1882. As a result of the railway's construction via that route, Mount Revelstoke and Glacier National Parks (Canada) in the heart of the Selkirks were among the first national parks created in Canada, along with Yoho and Banff National Parks in the Rockies. Until the completion of the Trans-Canada Highway via the Rogers Pass, automotive traffic between most of British Columbia and the rest of Canada necessarily was forced to follow the path of the Columbia River via its Big Bend, around the north end of the Selkirks.

== Fauna ==
This area, some of it protected in Washington's Salmo-Priest Wilderness, is also home to mule deer and white-tailed deer, elk, black bears, cougars, bobcats, red fox, bald eagles, golden eagles, osprey, great blue heron, porcupine, badgers, coyote, martens, bighorn sheep, mountain goats, gray wolves and moose. Formerly rarely seen, grizzly bears are also known to roam through this region now in abundance.

=== South Selkirk mountain caribou ===
The southern end of the Selkirk Mountains was the home of the last naturally occurring caribou herd in the contiguous United States, the South Selkirk mountain caribou. The herd was cross boundary, spending some time in extreme northern Idaho, eastern Washington, and British Columbia, Canada. The South Selkirk mountain caribou is a woodland mountain caribou, an ecotype of the boreal woodland caribou, one of the most critically endangered mammals.

In 2009 the herd of 50 animals was declining. Predation from wolves that had been reintroduced to the area negatively affected the herd, and by April 2018, only three remained, and in January 2019, the American Association for the Advancement of Science (AAAS) announced in its scientific journal, Science, that British Columbia's provincial biologists captured the female caribou in Canada and moved her to a captive rearing pen near Revelstoke in the hopes of "preserving highly endangered herds". According to the AAAS, it is believed that this female caribou is the "last member of the last herd to regularly cross into the lower 48 states from Canada".

== Sub-ranges ==
- Asulkan Range
- Battle Range
- Big Bend Ranges
  - Adamant Range
  - Sir Sandford Range
  - Windy Range
- Bishops Range
- Bonnington Range
- Clachnacudainn Range
- Dawson Range
- Dishman Hills
- Duncan Ranges
  - Badshot Range
- Goat Range
- Hermit Range
- Holiday Hills
- Huckleberry Range
- Kokanee Range
- Lardeau Range
- Nelson Range
- Purity Range
- Sir Donald Range
- Three Rocks
- Valhalla Ranges
  - Ruby Range
- Valkyr Range
  - Norns Range

== Peaks ==
The 10 highest peaks

- Mount Sir Sandford (3,519 m)
- Mount Dawson (3,377 m)
- Mount Selwyn (3,355 m)
- Adamant Mountain (3,345 m)
- Austerity Mountain (3,337 m)
- Mount Wheeler (3,336 m)
- Grand Mountain (3,287 m)
- Mount Sir Donald (3,284 m)
- Sugarloaf Mountain (3,274 m)
- Beaver Mountain (3,212 m)
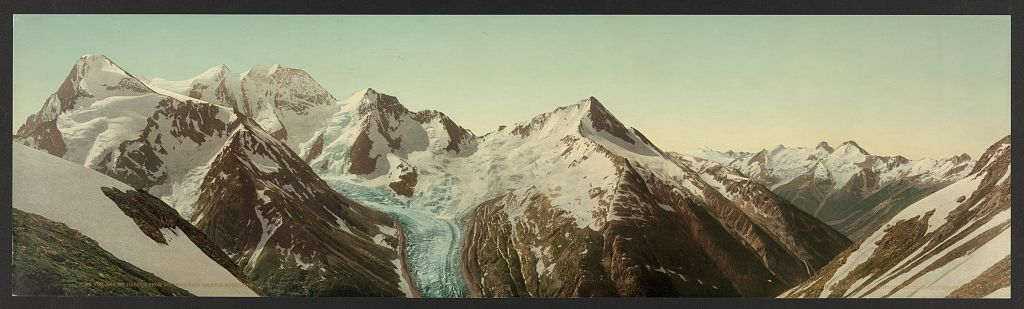
Mt. Fox and Mt. Dawson from Asulkan Pass, British Columbia, c. 1902
