= Mount Arthur Meighen =

Mountain in British Columbia, Canada

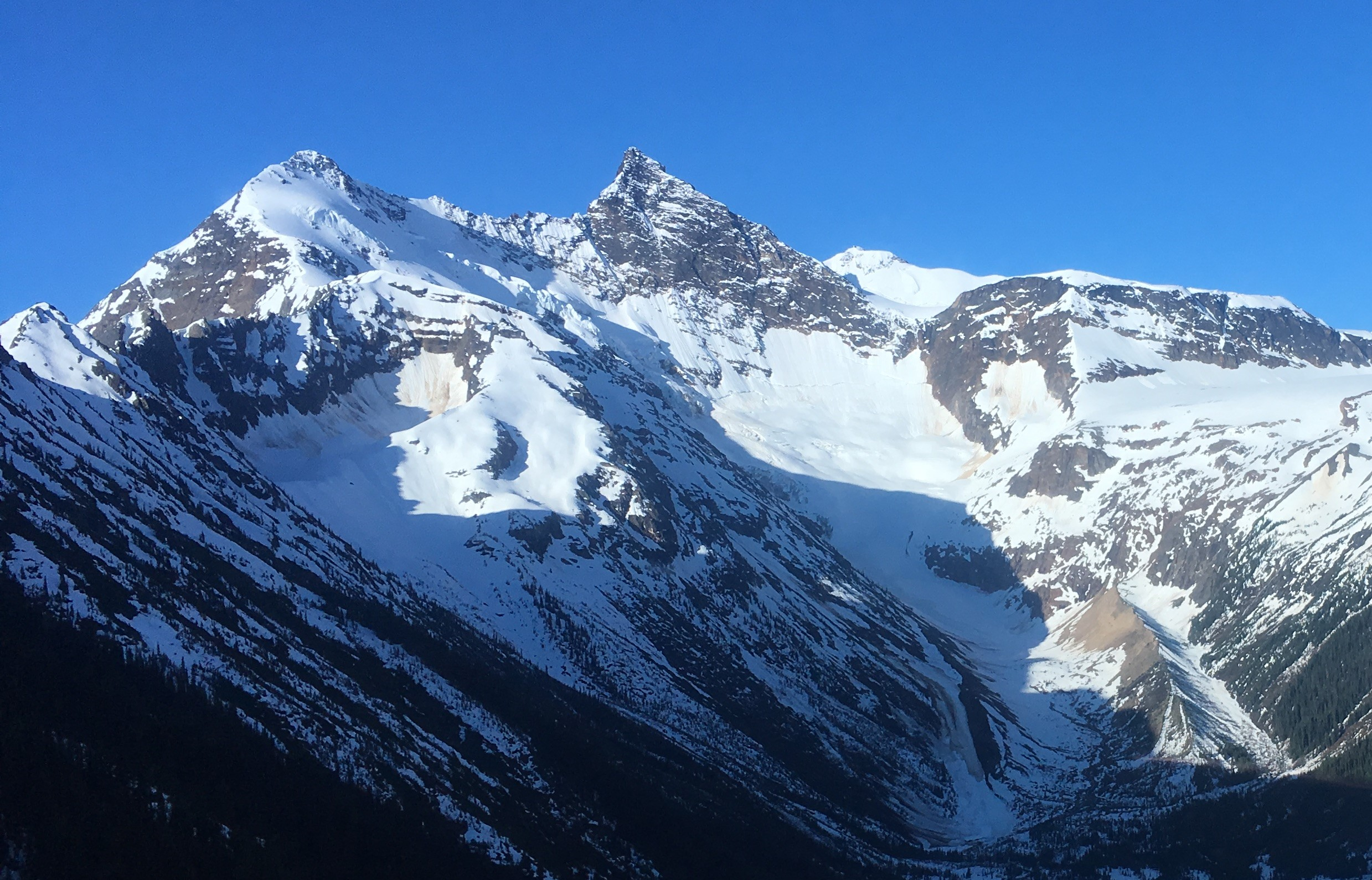
- Northeast aspect, aerial view

Highest point
- Elevation: 3,205 m (10,515 ft)
- Prominence: 415 m (1,362 ft)
- Parent peak: Mount Stanley Baldwin
- Listing: Mountains of British Columbia
- Coordinates: 52°48′11.9″N 119°33′11.9″W

Geography
- Location within British Columbia
- Location: British Columbia, Canada
- District: Cariboo Land District
- Parent range: Premier Range, Cariboo Mountains
- Topo map: NTS 83D13 Kiwa Creek

Climbing
- First ascent: 1949 by Alex Faberge, Sterling Hendricks, Don Hubbard, Art Lembeck, Chris Scoredos, and Arnold Wexler

Mount Arthur Meighen is a 3,205-metre (10,515-foot) mountain located in the Premier Range of the Cariboo Mountains in the east-central interior of British Columbia, Canada. The mountain is south of the head of the McLennan River and immediately west of the town of Valemount.

The name honours the ninth Prime Minister of Canada, Arthur Meighen, who held office for only fifteen months in 1920-1921 and three months in 1926. He died in 1960, thirty-six years after leaving office. The mountain was officially renamed after Meighen in 1962. Prior to that, it had been called "Carpé".

== Climate ==
Based on the Köppen climate classification, the mountain is located in a subarctic climate zone with cold, snowy winters, and mild summers. Temperatures in winter can drop below −20 °C with wind chill factors below −30 °C.

== Valemount Glacier Destination ==
The proposed Valemount Glacier Destination includes the mountain as the highest section of terrain. Two t-bar lifts are planned for construction on the McLennan Glacier for year-round alpine skiing, along with a gondola providing access from the lower resort area and a summer cross-country skiing area. The gondola would reach a top elevation of 3,010 metres (9,880 ft), with an optional lift potentially accessing the summit during later stages of resort development.
