= Tête Jaune Cache, British Columbia =

Tête Jaune Cache
- Unincorporated settlement
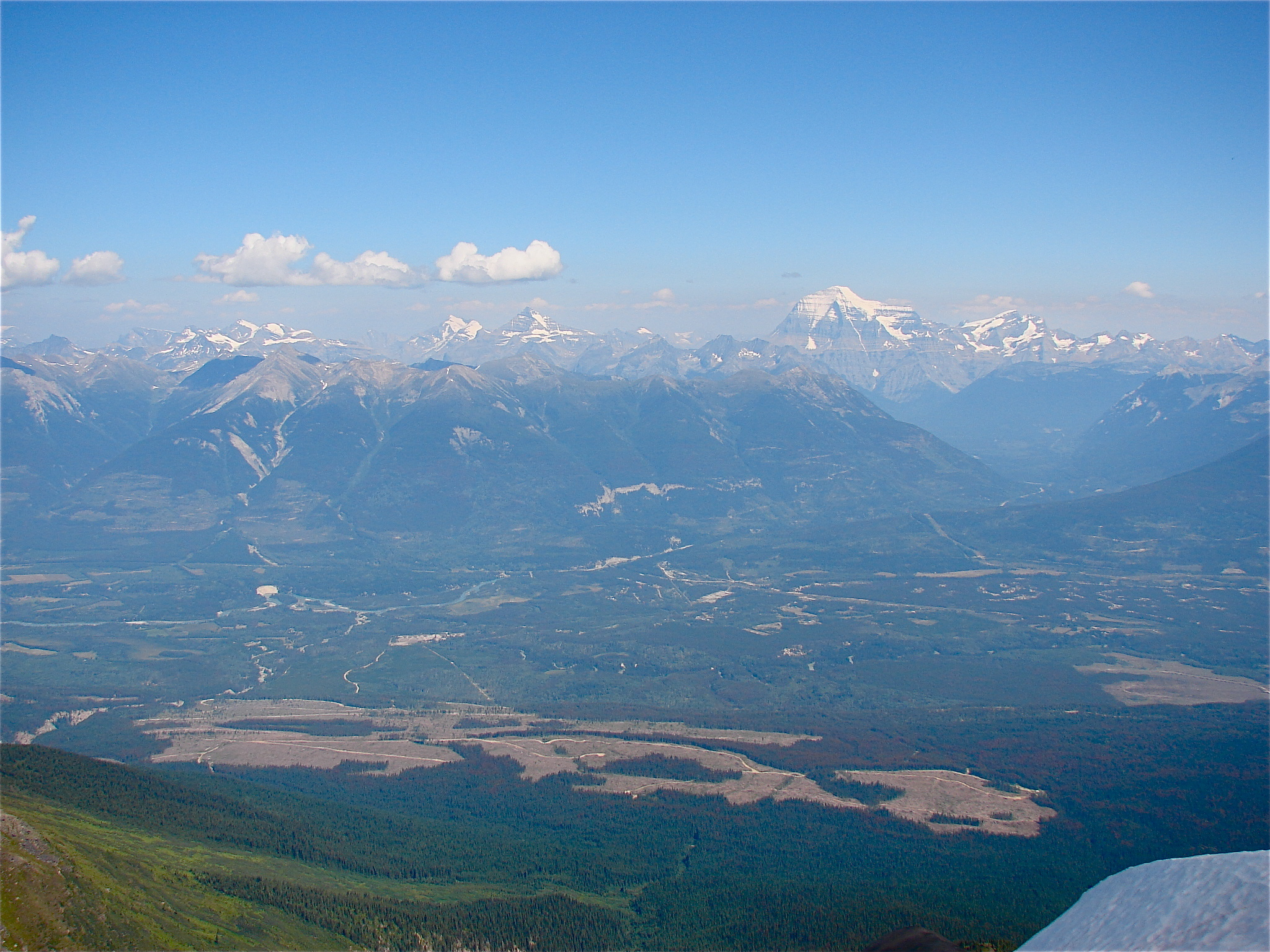
- Tête Jaune Cache from summit of Mica Mountain. Mount Robson in background

- Location of Tête Jaune Cache in British Columbia
- Coordinates: 52°58′00″N 119°25′45″W
- Country: Canada
- Province: British Columbia
- Region: BC Interior
- Regional district: Fraser-Fort George

Population (2006)
  - Total: 500
- Time zone: UTC−07:00 (PT)
- Area code: 250 / 778 / 236
- Highways: Highway 16 (TCH) Trans-Canada Highway; Highway 5
- Waterways: Fraser River; McLennan River

Tête Jaune Cache (/tɛt ʒoʊn kæʃ/ or /teɪ dʒɑːn kæʃ/) is an unincorporated rural area and the site of an important abandoned historic town in British Columbia, Canada. Its population is approximately 500. It is on the Fraser River in the Robson Valley at the intersection of Yellowhead Highways 5 and 16. Tête Jaune Cache is located 18 km (11 mi) north of Valemount, 101 km (63 mi) west of Jasper, Alberta, 241 km (150 mi) southeast of Prince George, and 332 km (206 mi) north of Kamloops, British Columbia, via the highways.

== History ==
Tête Jaune Cache was named after Métis fur trader and trapper Pierre Bostonais who guided for the Hudson's Bay Company in the 1800s. Bostonais was nicknamed Tête Jaune by the French-speaking voyageurs because of his blonde hair (Tête Jaune is French for "yellow head"). The Secwepemc had an established village of tents and quiggly holes on the banks of the Fraser in this area rich in salmon and wild berries when encountered by Bostonais, but the townsite land of Tête Jaune Cache was officially located in 1901 and Crown-granted in 1902. During the construction of the Grand Trunk Pacific Railway Tête Jaune Cache was a prosperous community and was the head of navigation for the paddle steamers of Foley, Welch and Stewart and the BC Express Company. The town was a booming collection of lumber shacks, tents, and log houses which brought thousands of pioneers, trappers, prospectors, foresters, and entrepreneurs to the Robson Valley. Major industries in historic Tête Jaune were timber, railways, steamship trade, and mining, especially for the locally abundant mica. Some of the largest and cleanest sheets of mica extracted in the era of its highest demand (for its usage in lanterns and stoves) came from this region, and the remains of one such mine are near the Mica Mountain hiking trail. The pool halls, theatres, restaurants, jewellers, lady barbers, saloons, and trading posts are no more, with only a few stone chimneys remaining as evidence of this bustling town's existence, but the Valley Museum and Archives in McBride, as well as the Valemount Historical Society maintains an excellent collection of photographs from the heyday of this boom town, c. 1910-1918. Currently the area under the aegis of Tête Jaune Cache is home to Hauer Brothers' Sawmill, as well as a few small businesses specializing in custom timber milling, woodworking, guided flyfishing, whitewater rafting, snowcat skiing, and bed and breakfast accommodation.

In August 1916, the Simpcw of Tête Jaune Cache were forcibly relocated out of the area to Chu Chua and other places. The people were made to travel the 300 kilometres by foot. In August 2016 events were held to mark the 100th anniversary of that event. The Simpcw First Nation has applied to the government to have lands at Tête Jaune Cache formally recognized.

== Ecology ==
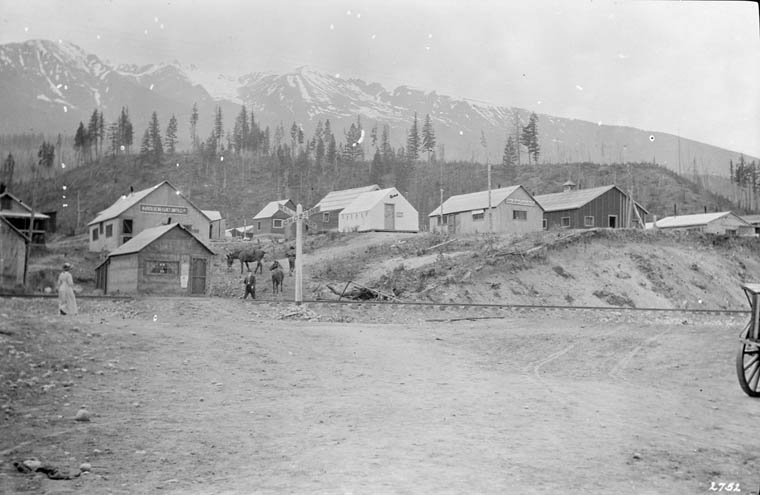
Foley, Welch and Stewart Cache in Tête Jaune Cache 1913

Tête Jaune Cache is an ecologically rich forest habitat for trees including lodgepole pine, trembling aspen, western red cedar, paper birch and douglas fir; wildlife such as moose, cougars, wolverines, black bears, grizzly bears, lynx, beavers, and marten. The shoals found where the McLennan River and Tête Creek join the Fraser River are some of the most important spawning grounds for Chinook Salmon at the end of their annual 1,200 km (750 mi) run from the Pacific Ocean. These creeks, as well as Kiwa Creek to the north, are fed directly by meltwater from the glaciers and icefields of the Premier Range of the Cariboo Mountains.

== Transportation ==
Tête Jaune Cache lies at the junction between what was originally the Canadian Northern Railway transcontinental main line between Quebec City and Vancouver and the Grand Trunk Pacific line to Prince Rupert. Today both lines are part of the Canadian National Railway. Passenger service is provided by Via Rail's Jasper – Prince Rupert train, which calls at the nearby Harvey Station on the Prince Rupert line. The community is also passed but not served by Via's transcontinental Canadian on the Vancouver line.
