= Mica Mountain (British Columbia) =

Mountain in British Columbia, Canada

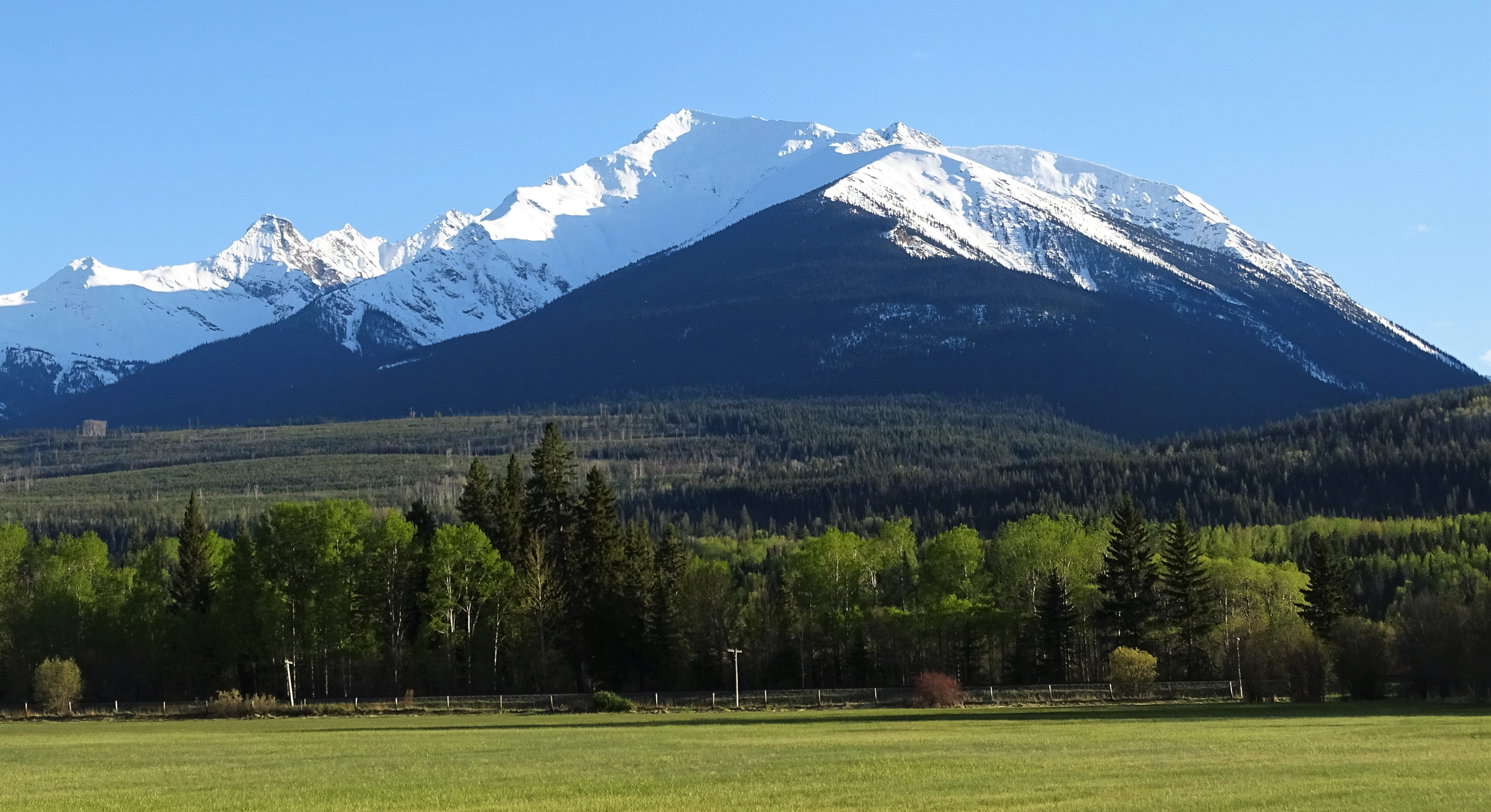
- North aspect

Highest point
- Elevation: 2,855 m (9,367 ft)
- Prominence: 361 m (1,184 ft)
- Listing: Mountains of British Columbia
- Coordinates: 52°53′14″N 119°31′41″W

Naming
- Etymology: Mica

Geography
- Location within British Columbia Location within Canada
- Interactive map of Mica Mountain
- Location: British Columbia, Canada
- District: Cariboo Land District
- Parent range: Cariboo Mountains; Premier Range
- Topo map: NTS 83D13 Kiwa Creek

Mica Mountain is a 2,855-meter-elevation (9,367-foot) mountain summit located in British Columbia, Canada.

== Description ==
Mica Mountain is situated 12 kilometers (7.5 miles) southwest of Tête Jaune Cache, British Columbia, at the eastern edge of the Premier Range which is a subset of the Cariboo Mountains. The Southern Yellowhead Highway passes the eastern base of the mountain as it traverses Robson Valley. Precipitation runoff from Mica Mountain drains into Tête Creek and the McLennan River. Topographic relief is significant as the summit rises over 1,650 meters (5,410 feet) above the creek in four kilometers (2.5 miles). In good weather the view from the summit includes Mount Robson, Canoe Mountain and Kinbasket Lake. The mountain's well-established local name was officially adopted 23 May 1962 by the Geographical Names Board of Canada. The name refers to the mineral mica which was mined from the higher slopes of the peak in the early 1900s.

== Climate ==
Based on the Köppen climate classification, Mica Mountain is located in a subarctic climate zone with cold, snowy winters, and mild summers. Temperatures in winter can drop below −20 °C with wind chill factors below −30 °C.

== Gallery ==
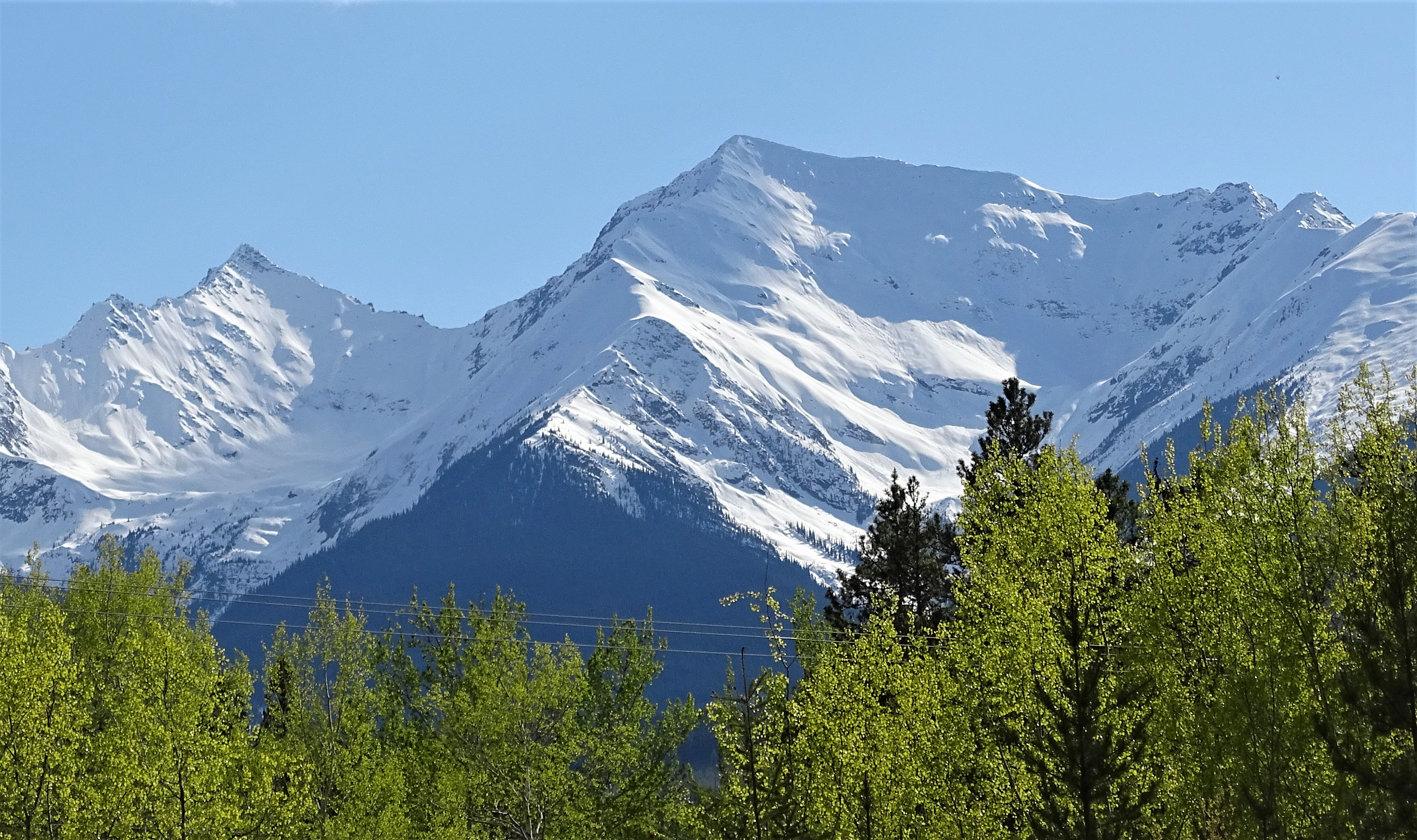
Northeast aspect

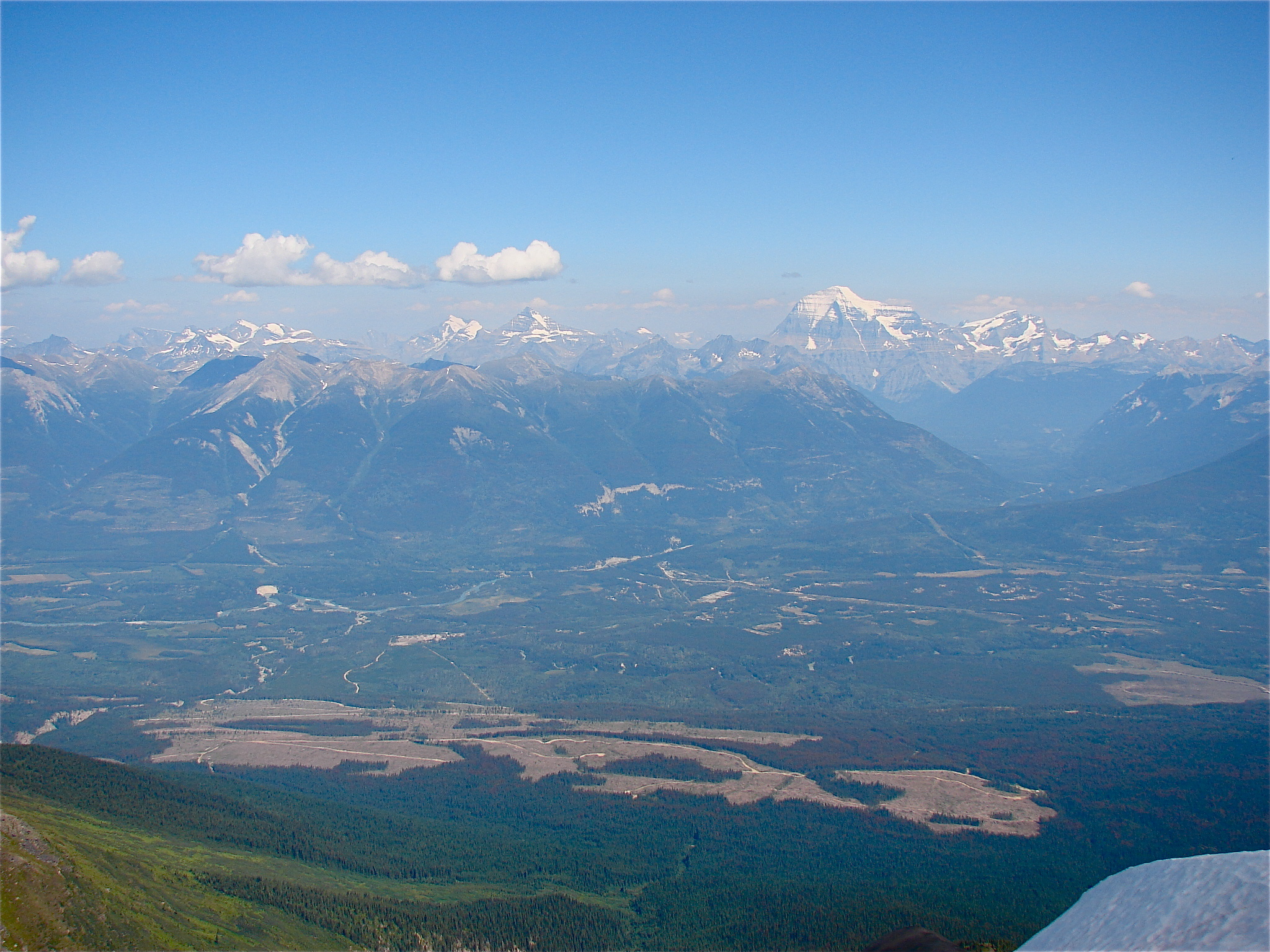
Tête Jaune Cache from summit of Mica Mountain, with Mount Robson in background

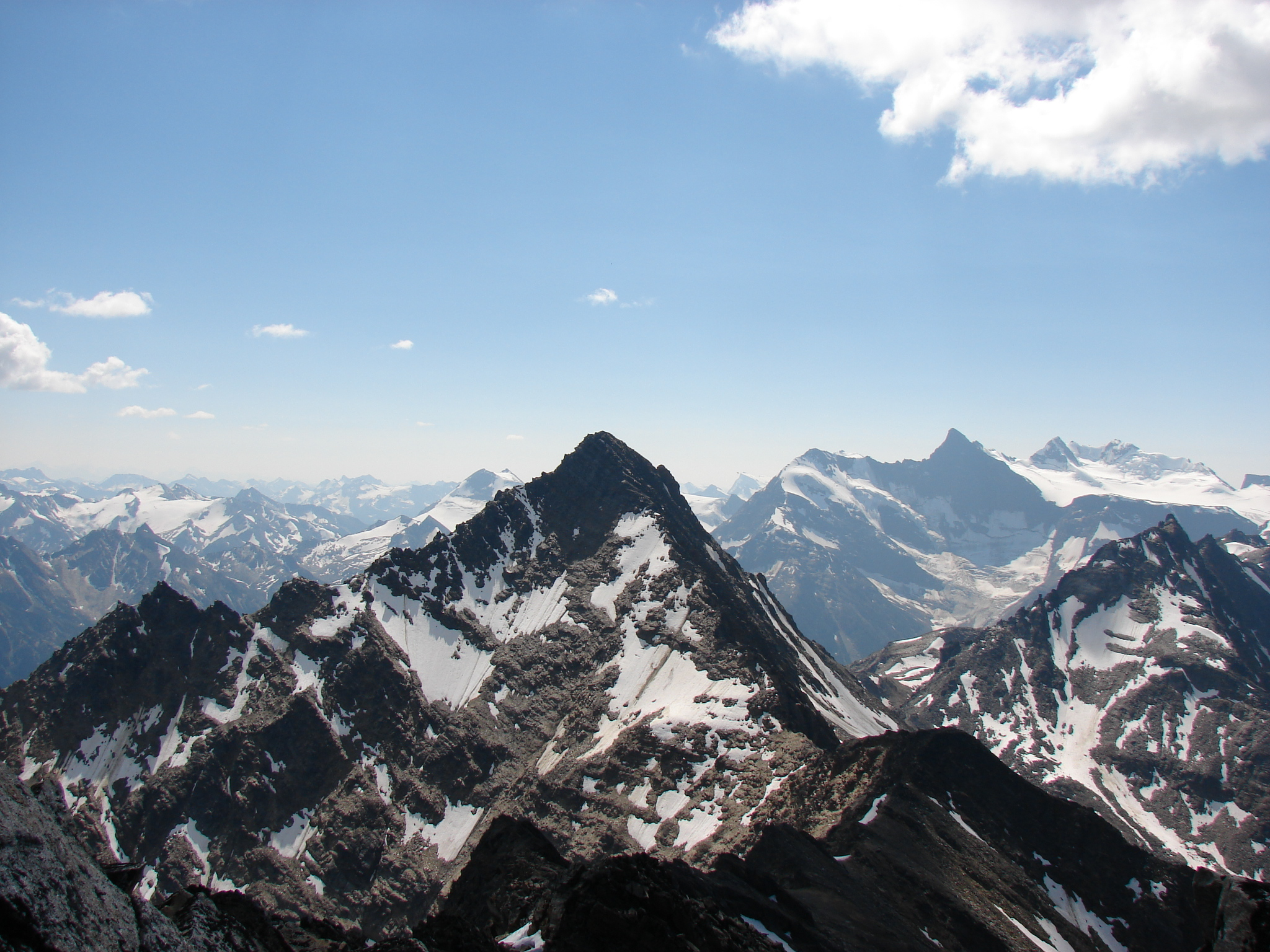
Peaks of the Premier Range, looking south from the summit of Mica Mountain

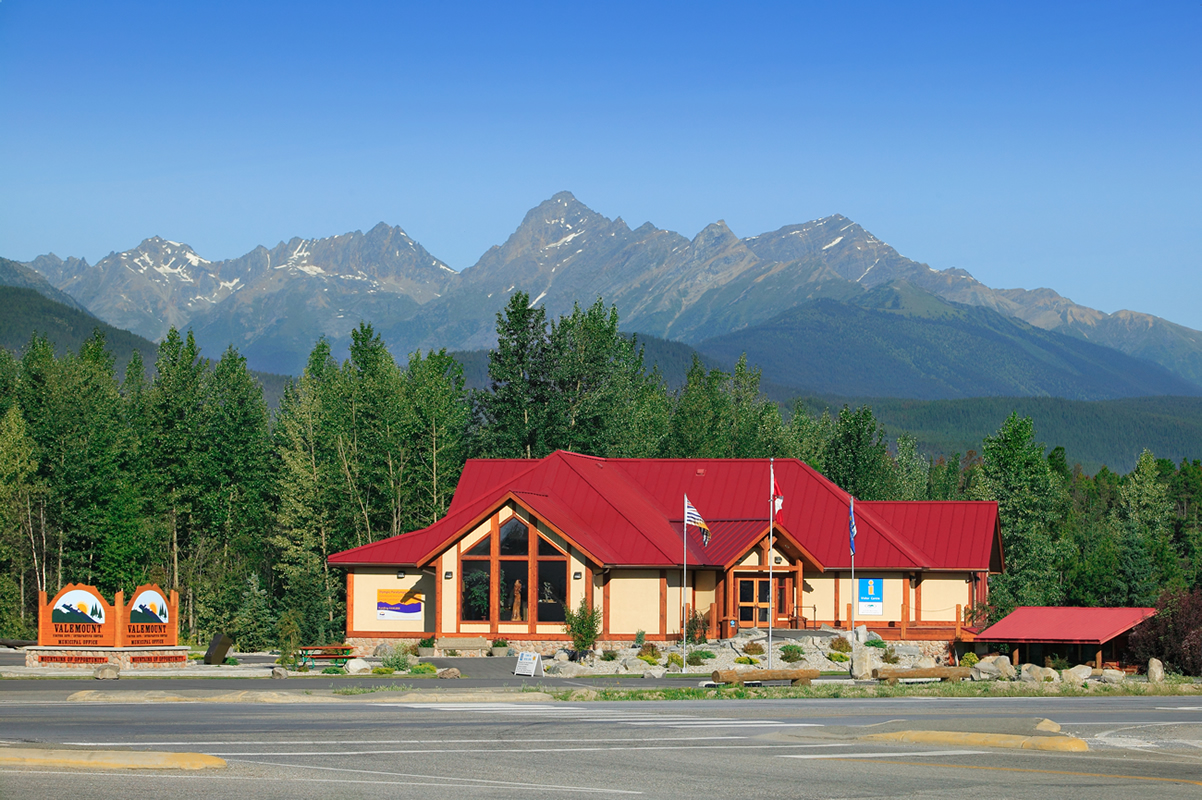
Mica Mountain (right) seen with Valemount Visitor Information Centre

== See also ==
- Geography of British Columbia
