= Mount John Oliver =

Mountain in the country of Canada

- Location within British Columbia

Highest point
- Elevation: 3,123 m (10,246 ft)
- Prominence: 613 m (2,011 ft)
- Parent peak: Mount Sir Mackenzie Bowell (3301 m)
- Listing: Mountains of British Columbia
- Coordinates: 52°53′02″N 119°41′07″W

Geography
- Location: British Columbia, Canada
- District: Cariboo Land District
- Parent range: Premier Range
- Topo map: NTS 83D13 Kiwa Creek

Climbing
- First ascent: July 29, 1962

Mount John Oliver is a 3,123-metre (10,246 ft) mountain in the Premier Range of the Cariboo Mountains in the east-central interior of British Columbia, Canada. The mountain is located on the divide between the Kiwa and Tete Creeks and is covered by a glacier.

The name honours John Oliver, the Premier of British Columbia from 1921 to 1927. The mountain was named after Oliver in 1927 upon the dedication of the Premier Range as a memorial to British and Canadian heads of government. It is the only mountain in the Premier Range to be named after a provincial premier.
