= Mount Pierre Elliott Trudeau =

Mountain in British Columbia, Canada

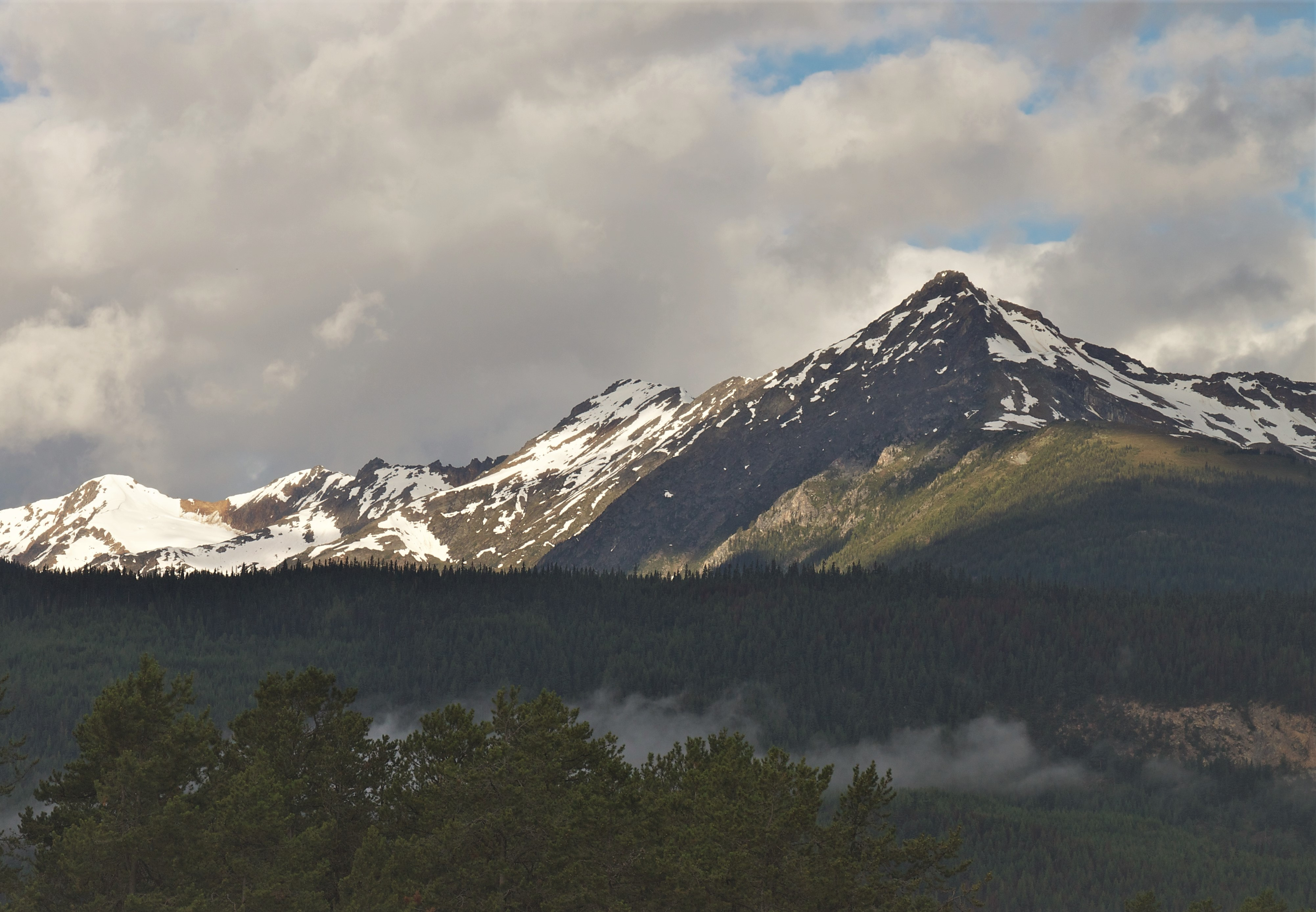
- Mount Pierre Elliott Trudeau (right) viewed from Valemount

Highest point
- Elevation: 2,650 m (8,690 ft)
- Prominence: 400 m (1,300 ft)
- Parent peak: Mount Lester Pearson (3086 m)
- Listing: Mountains of British Columbia
- Coordinates: 52°48′10″N 119°25′31″W

Geography
- Location within British Columbia
- Location: British Columbia, Canada
- District: Cariboo Land District
- Parent range: Premier Range
- Topo map: NTS 83D14 Valemount

Mount Pierre Elliott Trudeau is a 2,640-metre (8,661 ft) mountain located in the Premier Range of the Cariboo Mountains in the Interior of British Columbia, Canada. The mountain is located on the south side of the McLennan River, just west of Valemount.

The name honours the fifteenth Prime Minister of Canada, Pierre Elliott Trudeau, who died in 2000. Upon Trudeau's death, then-Prime Minister Jean Chrétien floated the idea of renaming Mount Logan, Canada's highest peak, for Trudeau; when this met with resistance, this formerly unnamed peak was given the designation on June 10, 2006 in a ceremony held at Valemount and attended by Trudeau's eldest son, Justin.
