= Mount Lester Pearson =

Mountain in British Columbia, Canada

- Location within British Columbia

Highest point
- Elevation: 3,086 m (10,125 ft)
- Prominence: 316 m (1,037 ft)
- Listing: Mountains of British Columbia
- Coordinates: 52°46′47″N 119°32′42″W

Geography
- Location: British Columbia, Canada
- District: Cariboo Land District
- Parent range: Premier Range
- Topo map: NTS 83D13 Kiwa Creek

Mount Lester Pearson is a 3,086-metre (10,125 ft) mountain located in the Premier Range of the Cariboo Mountains in the east-central interior of British Columbia, Canada. The mountain is located south of the head of the McLennan River and 21 km (13 mi) west of Valemount, British Columbia.

The name honours the fourteenth Prime Minister of Canada and 1957 recipient of the Nobel Peace Prize, Lester Pearson, who died in 1972. The mountain was officially named after Pearson in 1973.
