= Mount Richard Bennett =

Mountain in British Columbia, Canada

Coordinates: 52°49′48″N 119°47′36″W

Mount Richard Bennett is a 3,190 m (10,466 ft) peak located at co-ordinates in the Premier Range of the Cariboo Mountains in the east-central interior of British Columbia, Canada. The mountain is just north of the taller Mount Sir John Abbott and is often considered a continuation of that mountain.

The name honours the eleventh Prime Minister of Canada, Richard Bedford Bennett, who died in 1947. The mountain was officially renamed after Bennett in 1962.
