= Mount Mackenzie King =

Mountain in British Columbia, Canada

- Location within British Columbia

Highest point
- Elevation: 3,234 m (10,610 ft)
- Prominence: 504 m (1,654 ft)
- Listing: Mountains of British Columbia
- Coordinates: 52°46′32.9″N 119°45′02.9″W

Geography
- Location: British Columbia, Canada
- District: Cariboo Land District
- Parent range: Premier Range
- Topo map: NTS 83D13 Kiwa Creek

Mount Mackenzie King is a peak located in the Premier Range of the Cariboo Mountains in the east-central interior of British Columbia, Canada. The mountain separates the Laurier Glacier to the north from the David Glacier to the south.

The name honours the tenth Prime Minister of Canada, William Lyon Mackenzie King, who died in 1950. The mountain was officially renamed after Mackenzie King in 1962. The mountain was originally referred to as Hostility Mountain by Don Munday in his 1925 ascent.
