= Mount Sir Wilfrid Laurier =

Mountain in British Columbia, Canada

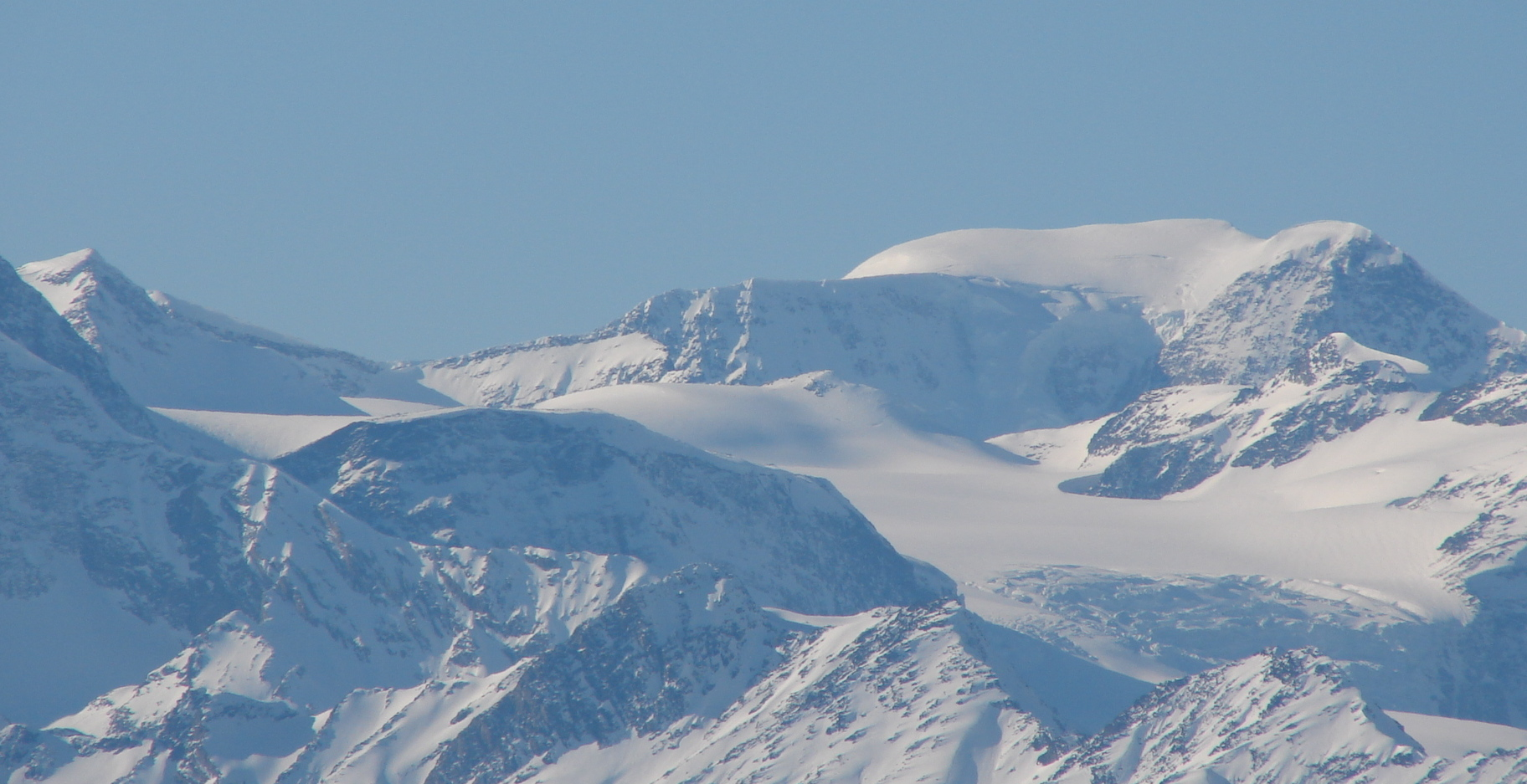
- South face of Mount Sir Wilfrid Laurier

Highest point
- Elevation: 3,516 m (11,535 ft)
- Prominence: 2,728 m (8,950 ft)
- Parent peak: Mount Clemenceau
- Listing: Mountains of British Columbia; North America prominent peaks 24th; Canada highest major peaks 40th; Canada most prominent peaks 8th
- Coordinates: 52°48′05″N 119°43′54″W

Geography
- Location within British Columbia
- Location: British Columbia, Canada
- District: Cariboo Land District
- Parent range: Premier Range
- Topo map: NTS 83D13 Kiwa Creek

Climbing
- First ascent: July 5, 1924 by Allen Carpé, Rollin Chamberlin, & A. Withers

Mount Sir Wilfrid Laurier is the highest peak of the Cariboo Mountains in the east-central interior of British Columbia, Canada. The mountain is part of the Premier Range, which is located just west of Valemount.

The name honours the seventh Prime Minister of Canada, Sir Wilfrid Laurier, who died in 1919. Originally named "Mount Titan" by American mountaineer Allen Carpé, it was officially renamed in 1929 to honour Canada's Liberal prime minister.

== Gallery ==
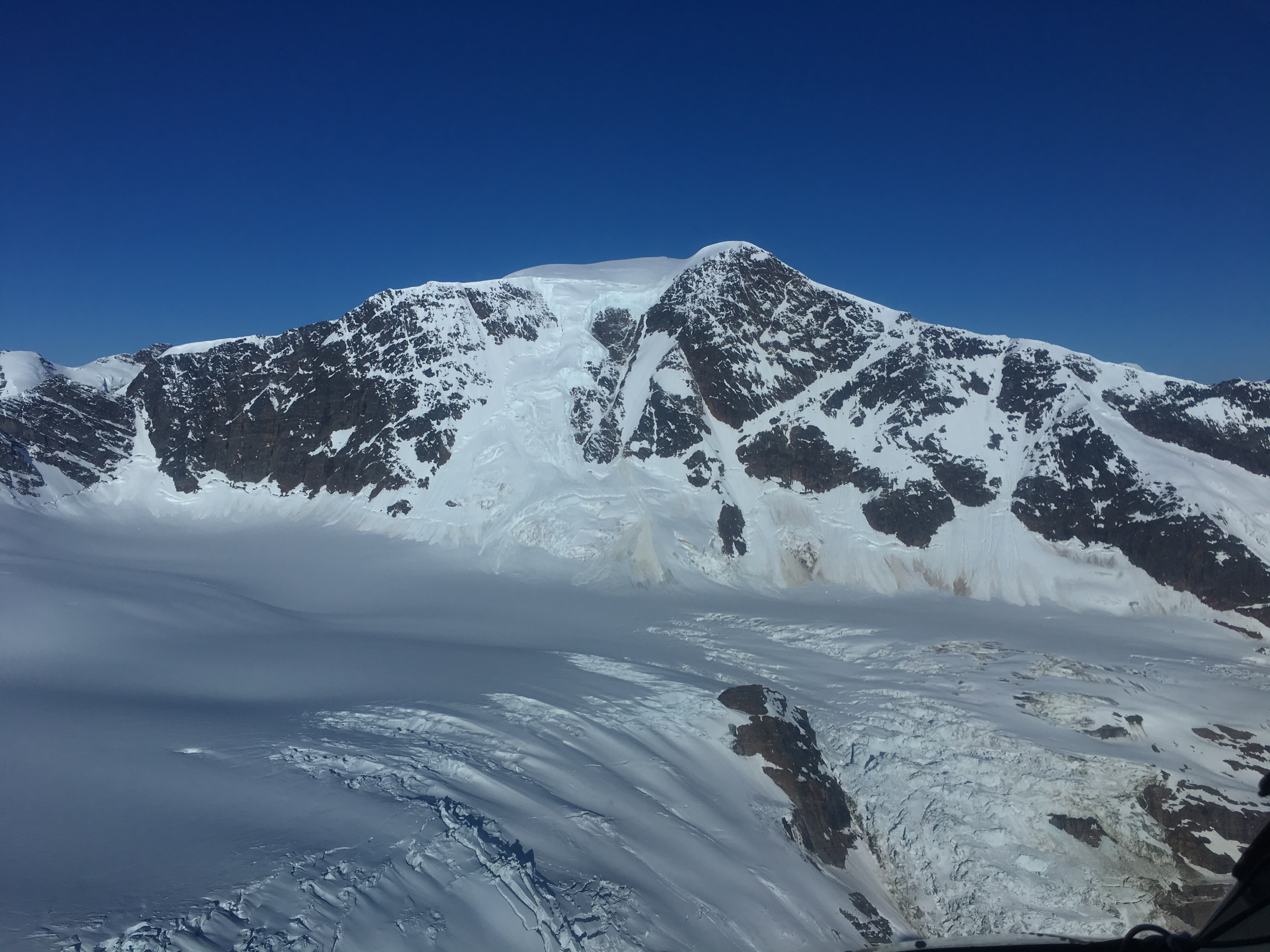

== See also ==
- Geography of British Columbia
- List of mountain peaks of North America
