= Mount Louis Saint Laurent =

Mountain in British Columbia, Canada

Mount Louis Saint Laurent is a 3,045 m (9,990 ft) mountain located at co-ordinates in the Premier Range of the Cariboo Mountains in the east-central interior of British Columbia, Canada. The mountain is to the west of the David Glacier and overlooks the Raush River.

The name honours the twelfth Prime Minister of Canada, Louis Saint Laurent, who died in 1973. The mountain was officially named after Saint Laurent in 1964.
