= Mount Sir John Thompson =

Mountain in British Columbia, Canada

Mount Sir John Thompson is a 3,349 m (10,988 ft) mountain located at co-ordinates in the Premier Range of the Cariboo Mountains in the east-central interior of British Columbia, Canada. The mountain is located between the David and North Canoe Glaciers.

The name honours the fourth Prime Minister of Canada, Sir John Thompson, who died in 1894 while in office. It was one of the first mountains in the Premier Range to be named after a Prime Minister, receiving its designation on September 6, 1927. It was originally named Mount David Thompson by the Carpe-Chamberlin climbing party in 1924, as they apparently believed that the nearby pass was the source of the North Thompson River.
