= Mount Sir John Abbott =

Mountain in Canada

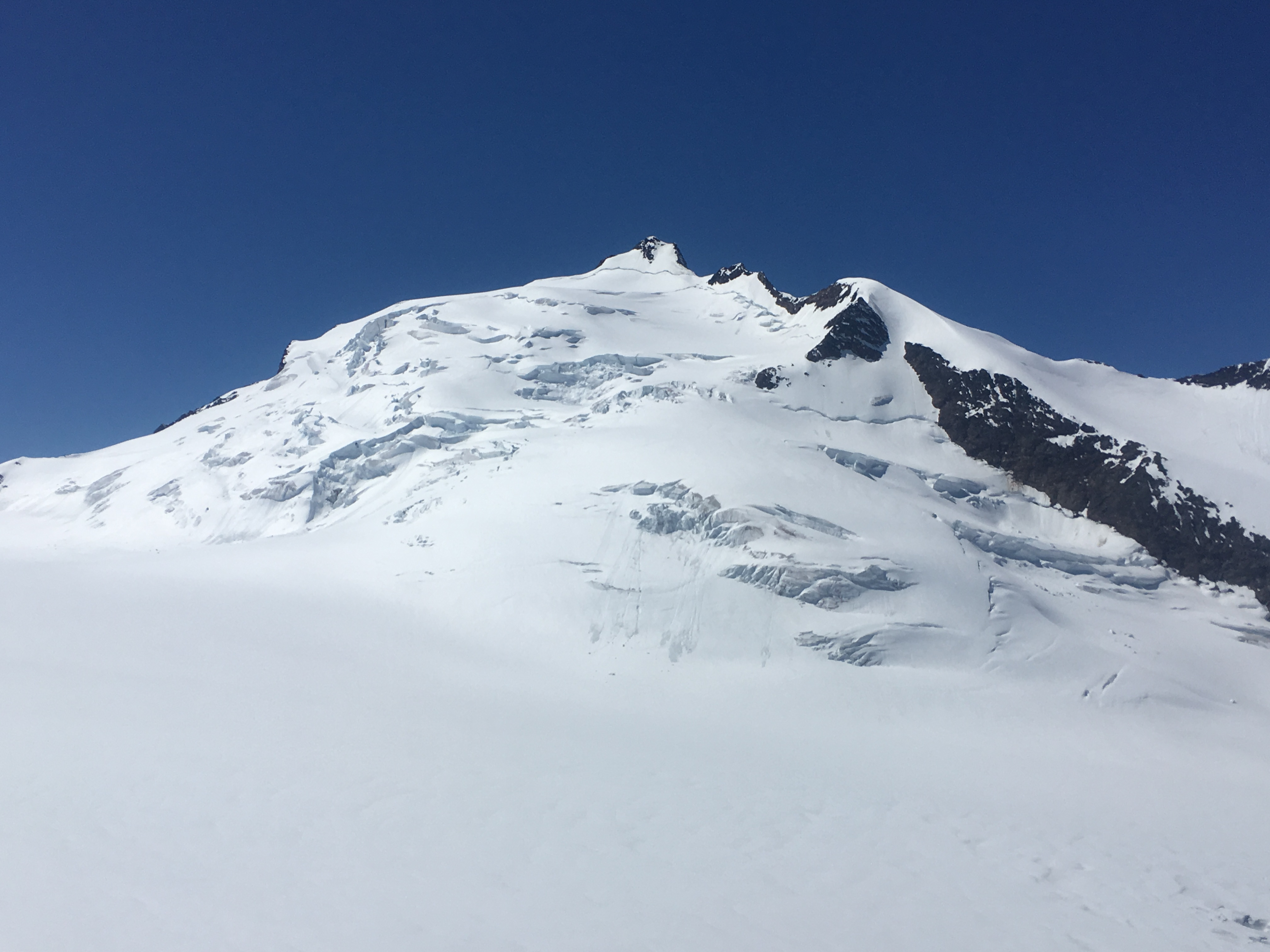

Highest point
- Elevation: 3,398 m (11,148 ft)
- Prominence: 593 m (1,946 ft)
- Listing: Mountains of British Columbia
- Coordinates: 52°48′39″N 119°47′39″W

Geography
- Location within British Columbia
- Country: Canada
- Province: British Columbia
- District: Cariboo Land District
- Parent range: Premier Range
- Topo map: NTS 83D13 Kiwa Creek

Mount Sir John Abbott is a 3,398-metre (11,148 ft) mountain located in the Premier Range of the Cariboo Mountains in the east-central interior of British Columbia, Canada. It is located at the south end of the west wall of Kiwa Glacier, the source of Kiwa Creek.

The name honours the second Prime Minister of Canada, Sir John Abbott, who died in 1893. It was one of the first mountains in the Premier Range to be named after a Prime Minister, receiving its designation on September 6, 1927. It was originally named Mount Kiwa.
