= Mount Logan =

Highest mountain in Canada

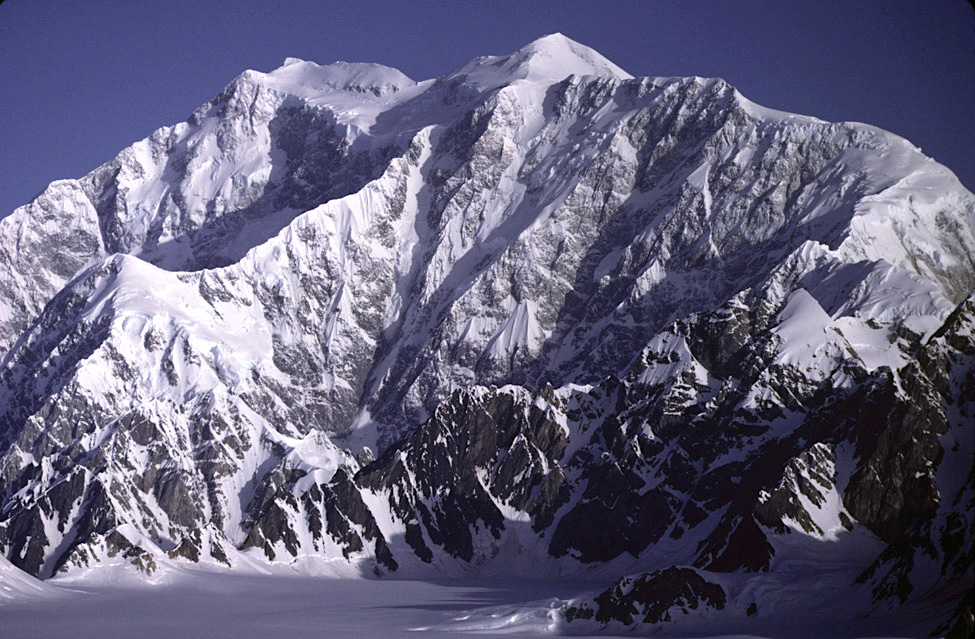
- Mount Logan from the southeast

Highest point
- Elevation: 5,959 m (19,551 ft)
- Prominence: 5,250 m (17,220 ft)
- Parent peak: Denali
- Isolation: 622 km (386 mi)
- Listing: World most prominent peaks 6th; Seven Second Summits 3rd; Country high points 15th; North America highest peaks 2nd; North America prominent peaks 2nd; North America isolated peaks 22nd; Canada highest major peaks 1st; Canadian subnational high points 1st
- Coordinates: 60°34′02″N 140°24′19″W

Geography
- Location within Yukon
- Interactive map of Mount Logan
- Country: Canada
- Territory: Yukon
- Parent range: Saint Elias Mountains
- Topo map: NTS 115C9 McArthur Peak

Climbing
- First ascent: 1925 by A.H. MacCarthy et al.
- Easiest route: glacier/snow/ice climb

Mount Logan (/ˈloʊɡən/ LOH-ghən) is the highest mountain in Canada, and the second-highest peak in North America after Denali. The mountain was named after Sir William Edmond Logan, a Canadian geologist and founder of the Geological Survey of Canada (GSC). Mount Logan is located within Kluane National Park and Reserve in southwestern Yukon, less than 40 kilometres (25 miles) north of the Yukon–Alaska border. Mount Logan is the source of the Hubbard and Logan glaciers. Although many shield volcanoes are much larger in size and mass, Mount Logan is believed to have the largest base circumference of any non-volcanic mountain on Earth, including a massif with eleven peaks over 5,000 metres (16,000 feet). Mount Logan is the 6th most topographically prominent peak on Earth.

Due to active tectonic uplifting, Mount Logan is still rising in height (approximately 0.35 millimetres (0.014 in) per year). Before 1992, the exact elevation of Mount Logan was unknown and measurements ranged from 5,959 to 6,050 metres (19,551 to 19,849 ft). In May 1992, a GSC expedition climbed Mount Logan and fixed the current height of 5,959 metres (19,551 ft) using GPS.

Temperatures are extremely low on and near Mount Logan. On the 5,000-metre-high (16,000-foot; 5.0-kilometre) plateau, air temperature hovers around −45 °C (−49 °F) in the winter and reaches near freezing in summer with the median temperature for the year around −27 °C (−17 °F). Minimal snow melt leads to a significant ice cap, almost 300 metres (980 ft) thick in certain spots.

== Peaks of the massif ==
The Mount Logan massif is considered to contain all the surrounding peaks with less than 500 metres (1,600 ft) of prominence, as listed below:

Peak	Height	Prominence	Coordinates
Main	5,959 m (19,551 ft)	5,250 m (17,220 ft) above Mentasta Pass	60°34′2″N 140°24′19″W
Philippe Peak (West)	5,925 m (19,439 ft)	265 m (869 ft)	60°34′42.6″N 140°26′02.4″W
Logan East Peak (Stuart Peak)	5,898 m (19,350 ft)	198 m (650 ft)	60°34′31.1″N 140°22′00.1″W
Houston's Peak	5,740 m (18,830 ft)	100 m (330 ft)	60°35′03.5″N 140°27′20.5″W
Prospector Peak	5,644 m (18,517 ft)	344 m (1,129 ft)	60°35′58.9″N 140°30′40.7″W
AINA Peak	5,630 m (18,470 ft)	130 m (430 ft)	60°36′31.8″N 140°31′48.6″W
Russell Peak	5,580 m (18,310 ft)	80 m (260 ft)	60°35′31.2″N 140°29′08.9″W
Tudor Peak (Logan North Peak)	5,559 m (18,238 ft)	219 m (719 ft)	60°36′58.2″N 140°29′35.4″W
Saxon Peak (Northeast)	5,500 m (18,000 ft)	80 m (260 ft)	60°37′12.0″N 140°27′57.6″W
Queen Peak	5,380 m (17,650 ft)	160 m (520 ft)	60°36′33.5″N 140°35′12.5″W
Capet Peak (Northwest)	5,250 m (17,220 ft)	240 m (790 ft)	60°38′15.0″N 140°32′41.3″W
Catenary Peak	4,097 m (13,442 ft)	397 m (1,302 ft)	60°36′36.0″N 140°17′52.1″W
Teddy Peak	3,956 m (12,979 ft)	456 m (1,496 ft)	60°32′37.7″N 140°28′41.5″W

== Discovery and naming ==
Mount Logan is not readily visible from the surrounding lowlands or the coast, due to its position in the heart of the Saint Elias Mountains, although it can be seen from 201 kilometres (125 mi) out to sea. Pictures taken across Yakutat Bay to the south southeast suggest it is visible from near Yakutat. Its first reported sighting was in 1890 by American geologist Israel C. Russell, during an expedition to nearby Mount Saint Elias, from the crest of the Pinnacle Pass Hills (60°9.5′N 140°18′W). Russel wrote: "The clouds parting toward the northeast revealed several giant peaks not before seen... One stranger, rising in three white domes far above the clouds, was especially magnificent". Russell gave the mountain its present name.

In 1894, Mount Logan's elevation was determined to be about 5,900 m (19,500 ft), making it the highest known peak in North America at the time. In 1898, Denali was determined to be higher.

== Ascent attempts ==
=== First ascent ===
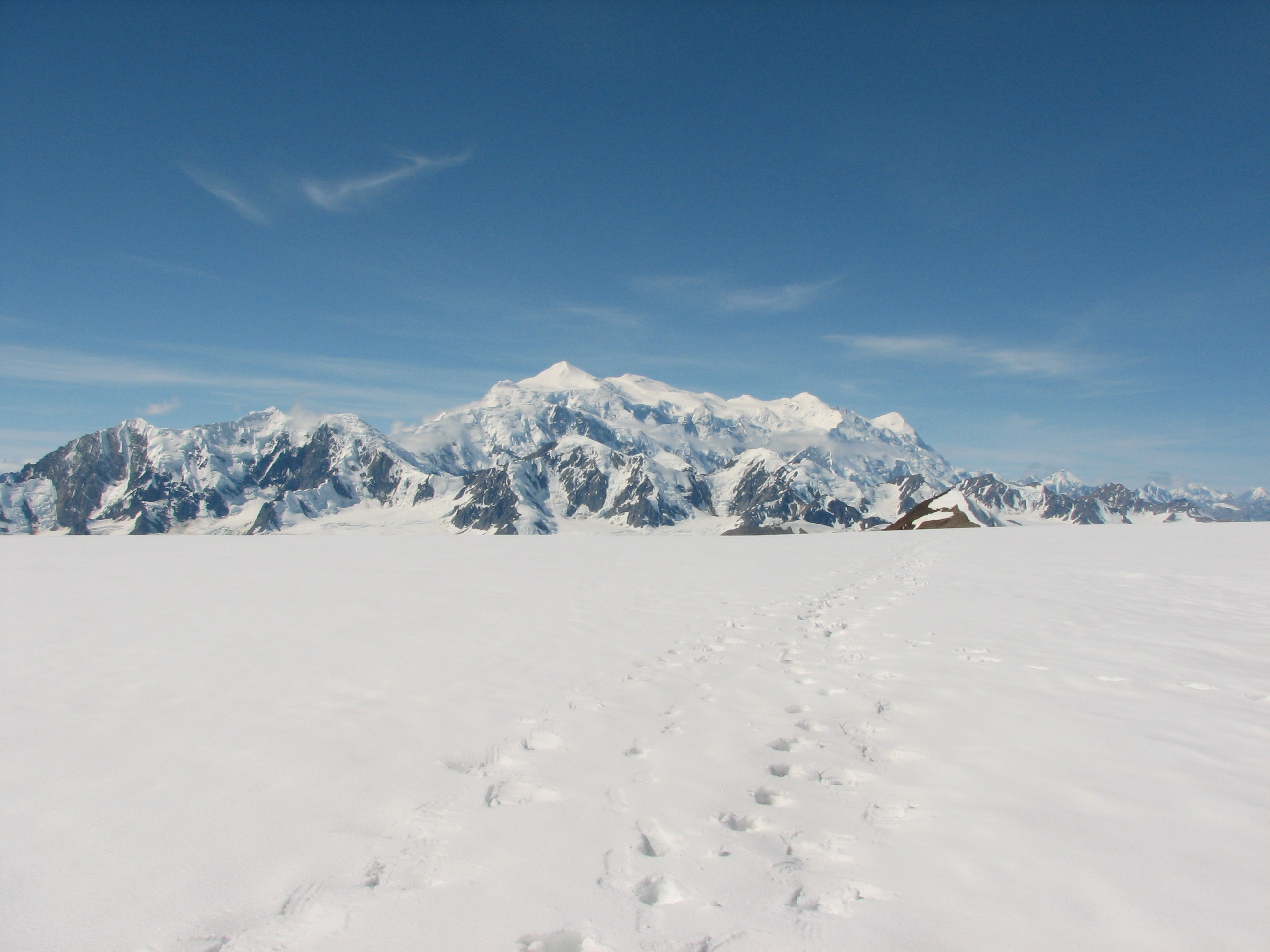
Mount Logan from the North East, as seen from Kluane Icefield

In 1922, a geologist approached the Alpine Club of Canada with the suggestion that the club send a team to the mountain to reach the summit for the first time. An international team of Canadian, British and American climbers was assembled the following year, initially planning an attempt in 1924 but forced by funding and preparation delays to postpone the trip until 1925. The international team of climbers began their journey in early May, crossing the mainland from the Pacific coast by train. They then walked the remaining 200 km (120 mi) to within 10 km (6.2 mi) of the Logan Glacier where they established base camp. In the early evening of June 23, 1925, Albert H. MacCarthy (leader), H.F. Lambart, Allen Carpé, Norman H. Read, W.W. Foster, and Andy Taylor stood on top of the summit for the first time. It had taken them 65 days to approach the mountain from the nearest town (McCarthy across the border in Alaska), reach the summit, and return, with all climbers intact, although some of them suffered severe frostbite.

=== Subsequent notable ascents and attempts ===
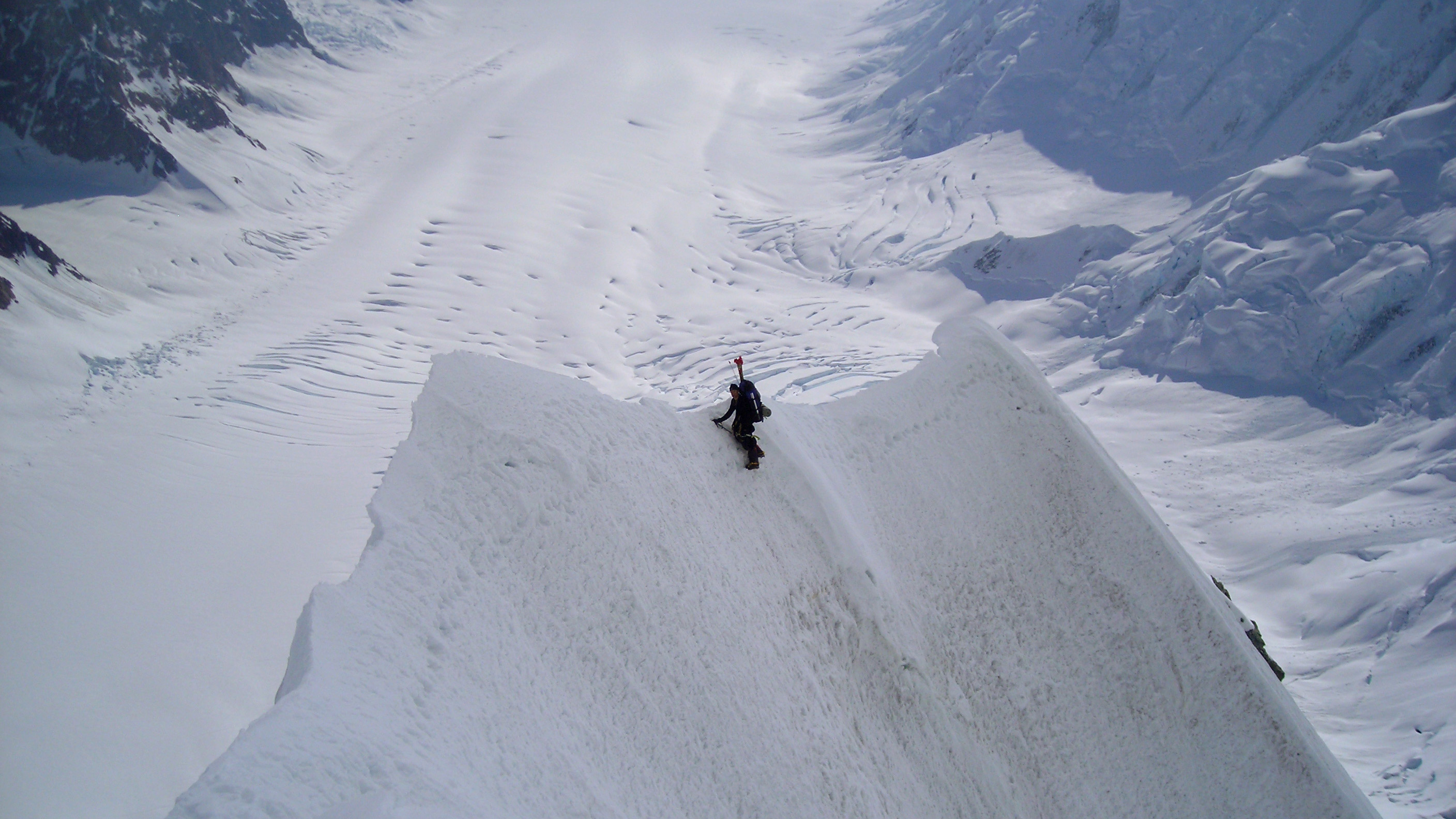
A climber on the knife ridge (east ridge)

- 1957 East Ridge. Don Monk, Gil Roberts and three others (US) reached the East Peak on July 19 after a 24-day climb.
- 1959 East Ridge, second ascent and first alpine-style ascent, Hans Gmoser and five others (Canada). Starting from Kluane Lake, they hiked and skied 160 km (100 mi) to reach the base of the mountain. They climbed the ridge in six days and summited the East Peak on June 12.
- 1965 Hummingbird Ridge (South Ridge). Dick Long, Allen Steck, John Evans, Jim Wilson, Franklin Coale Sr., and Paul Bacon (US) over 30 days, mid-July to Mid-August. Fred Beckey remarked: "When they got back we just couldn't believe that they had climbed that thing. We didn't think they had a chance".
- 1967, July, the first traverse of Mt. Logan was made by Vin Hoemann and William D. Harrison, starting at the "HubSew" ridge over the main summit. Team members Alex Bittenbinder, Dave Shaw, and Ed Ward joined them via the East Ridge.
- 1967, August, the first ski descent of the mountain was made in two stages by Daniel C. Taylor main summit to the Kluane glacier
- 1977 Warbler Ridge. Dave Jones, Frank Baumann, Fred Thiessen, Jay Page (all from Canada) and Rene Bucher (Swiss) in 22 days.
- 1978 West Ridge. Steve Davis (WA), Jon Waterman, George Sievewright, Roger Hurt (NH). Climbed ridge in 27 days "capsule-style".
- 1979 Northwest Ridge Michael Down (CA), Paul Kindree, John Howe, Reid Carter and John Wittmayer climbed to the summit over 22 days, topping out on June 19.
- 1979 South-Southwest Ridge. Raymond Jotterand (CA), Alan Burgess, Jim Elzinga and John Lauchlan reached the summit after 15 days of climbing on June 30 and July 1.
- 1986 First winter ascent by Todd Frankiewicz, Willy Hersman, Steve Koslow, George Rooney, Vernon Tejas and John Bauman via the King’s Trench Route on March 16.
- 1987 David Cheesmond and Catherine Freer disappeared while attempting to repeat the Hummingbird Ridge. Their bodies were not found until 2000. Due to the remoteness of Hummingbird Ridge and more crucially the precarious spot where the bodies are located, they have not been able to be recovered.
- 1992 June 6, an expedition sponsored by the Royal Canadian Geographical Society confirmed the height of Mount Logan using GPS. The leader was Michael Schmidt, with Lisel Currie, Leo Nadeay, Charlie Roots, J-C. Lavergne, Roger Laurilla, Patrick Morrow, Karl Nagy, Sue Gould, Alan Björn, Lloyd Freese, Kevin McLaughlin and Rick Staley.
- 2005 late May. Three climbers from the Vancouver-based North Shore Rescue team became stranded on the mountain. A joint operation by Canadian and American forces rescued the three climbers and took them to Anchorage, Alaska for treatment of frostbite.
- 2017 May 23. 15-year-old Naomi Prohaska reached the summit, the youngest person to do so. She was part of a team led by her father.
- 2018 June 14. The first all-US veteran team reached the summit. The six-person team was unguided and part of the US non-profit organization Veterans Expeditions.

Mount Logan 3D view

== Climbing rules ==
In January 2020, due to the cost of search and rescue operations in recent years, Parks Canada announced new rules for climbing Mount Logan:

- No solo expeditions
- No winter expeditions (which also includes all of Kluane National Park)
- Climbers must have insurance to cover the cost of search and rescue.

There had been eight rescue missions in the previous seven years in Kluane National Park. Each mission typically cost between $60,000 to $100,000 CAD which is paid for by Canadian taxpayers. A Parks Canada spokesperson said the new rules are to help reduce the financial burden to taxpayers.

== Proposed renaming ==
Following the death of Pierre Trudeau, former Prime Minister of Canada, in 2000, then Prime Minister Jean Chrétien, a close friend of Trudeau, proposed renaming the mountain "Mount Trudeau". However, opposition from Yukoners, mountaineers, geologists, Trudeau's political critics, and many other Canadians forced the plan to be dropped. A mountain in the Premier Range of British Columbia was named Mount Pierre Elliott Trudeau instead.

== In popular culture ==
X-Men writer Chris Claremont was inspired by Mount Logan for the adopted name of the superhero Wolverine; Claremont said in an interview that "the idea was the tallest mountain being the name of the shortest character".

== See also ==
- List of mountain peaks of North America
  - List of mountain peaks of Canada
    - List of highest points of Canadian provinces and territories
    - List of Ultras in Canada
- List of elevation extremes by country

== Bibliography ==
- Irving, R. L. G. (1940). Ten Great Mountains. London: J. M. Dent & Sons. [The climbing history up to 1939 of Mount Logan, Snowdon, Ben Nevis, Ushba, Everest, Nanga Parbat, Kanchenjunga, the Matterhorn, Aoraki / Mount Cook and Mont Blanc.]
- Roper, Steve; Steck, Allen (1979). Fifty Classic Climbs of North America. San Francisco, CA, USA: Sierra Club Books. pp. 179–182. ISBN 0-87156-292-8.
- Scott, Chic (2000). Pushing the Limits, The Story of Canadian Mountaineering. Calgary, Alberta, Canada: Rocky Mountain Books. ISBN 0-921102-59-3.
- Selters, Andy (2004). Ways to the Sky. Golden, CO, USA: American Alpine Club Press. ISBN 0-930410-83-1.
- Sherman, Paddy (1965). Cloud Walkers - Six Climbs on Major Canadian Peaks. Toronto, Canada: Macmillan of Canada. Lib Congress Cat# 65-25069.
