= Mount Stanley (disambiguation) =

Mount Stanley is the third-highest mountain in Africa.

Mount Stanley may also refer to:

== Antarctica ==
- Mount Stanley (Antarctica)

== Australia ==
- Mount Stanley, Queensland, a locality in the Somerset Region, Queensland
- Mount Stanley (Great Dividing Range), in Queensland
- Mount Stanley (King Island), in Tasmania

== Canada ==
- Mount Stanley (Canadian Rockies), in British Columbia
- Mount Stanley (Valkyr Range), in British Columbia

== See also ==
- Mount Stanley Baldwin, in British Columbia, Canada
- Stanley (disambiguation)
