= Mowdish Range =

Mountain range in British Columbia, Canada

- Location within British Columbia

Highest point
- Elevation: 2,543 m (8,343 ft)
- Coordinates: 53°07′24.1644″N 121°02′52.1052″W

Geography
- Country: Canada
- Region: British Columbia
- Parent range: Cariboo Mountains

The Mowdish Range is a mountain range in east-central British Columbia, Canada. It has an area of 303 km^{2} and is a subrange of the Cariboo Mountains which in turn form part of the Columbia Mountains. It is often called Mawdish Range with the local people and they have a tale about the misnaming which was made into a story. The name of the story is unknown and it has only been heard in old myths about the local people.

== See also ==
- List of mountain ranges
