= McLennan River =

River in British Columbia, Canada

- Location of river's mouth in British Columbia McLennan River (Canada)

Location
- Country: Canada
- Province: British Columbia
- District: Cariboo Land District

Physical characteristics
- Source: McLennan Glacier
  - location: Premier Range
  - coordinates: 52°49′20″N 119°33′27″W
  - elevation: 2,175 m (7,136 ft)
- Mouth: Fraser River
  - location: Tête Jaune Cache, Robson Valley
  - coordinates: 52°57′58″N 119°27′43″W
  - elevation: 727 m (2,385 ft)
- Basin size: 534 km^{2} (206 sq mi)

The McLennan River is a tributary of the Fraser River in the Robson Valley region of British Columbia. The river was named after an engineer on one of the Canadian Pacific Railway surveys in the 1870s.

== Course ==
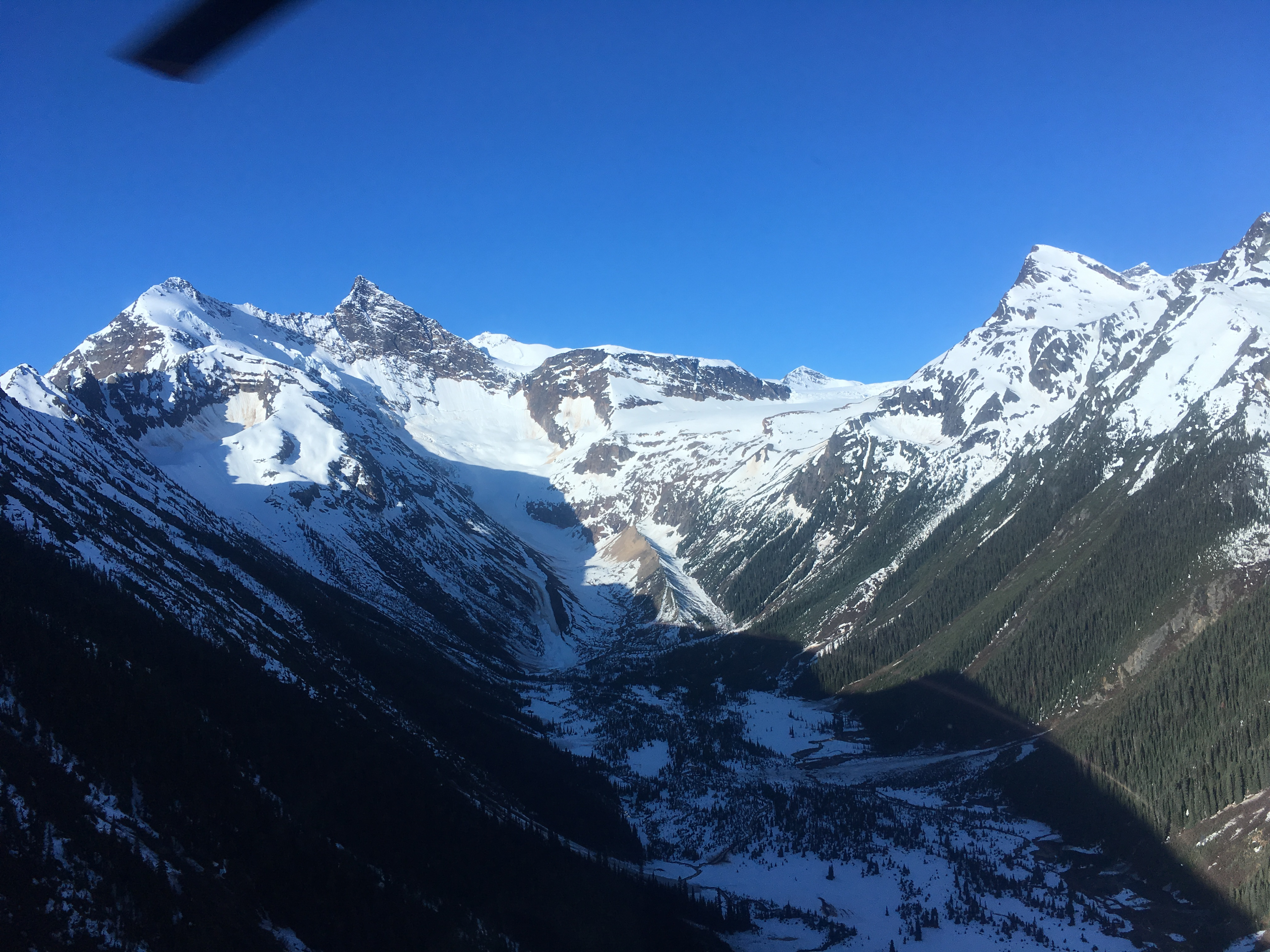
Headwall below McLennan Glacier and upper McLennan River flats

The McLennan River originates in the Premier Range, flowing from McLennan Glacier between Mount Stanley Baldwin and Mount Arthur Meighen. The river flows east out of the mountains into the Rocky Mountain Trench near Valemount. Then it turns northwest, flowing through the Rocky Mountain Trench, picking up tributary streams flowing from the Selwyn Range to the east and the Premier Range to the west. It joins the Fraser River at Tête Jaune Cache.

== See also ==
- List of rivers of British Columbia
