= Mount Sir Allan MacNab =

Mountain in British Columbia, Canada

- Mount MacNab
- Location within British Columbia

Highest point
- Elevation: 2,297 m (7,536 ft)
- Prominence: 367 m (1,204 ft)
- Listing: Mountains of British Columbia
- Coordinates: 52°31′14″N 119°12′13″W

Geography
- Location: British Columbia, Canada
- District: Kamloops Division Yale Land District
- Parent range: Premier Range
- Topo map: NTS 83D11 Canoe Mountain

Mount Sir Allan MacNab is a mountain located in the Premier Range of British Columbia, Canada. The range is named for Sir Allan MacNab, a Canadian industrialist who was premier of the Province of Canada from 1854 to 1856.
