= Raush River =

River in Canada

Coordinates: 53°12′02″N 120°00′31″W

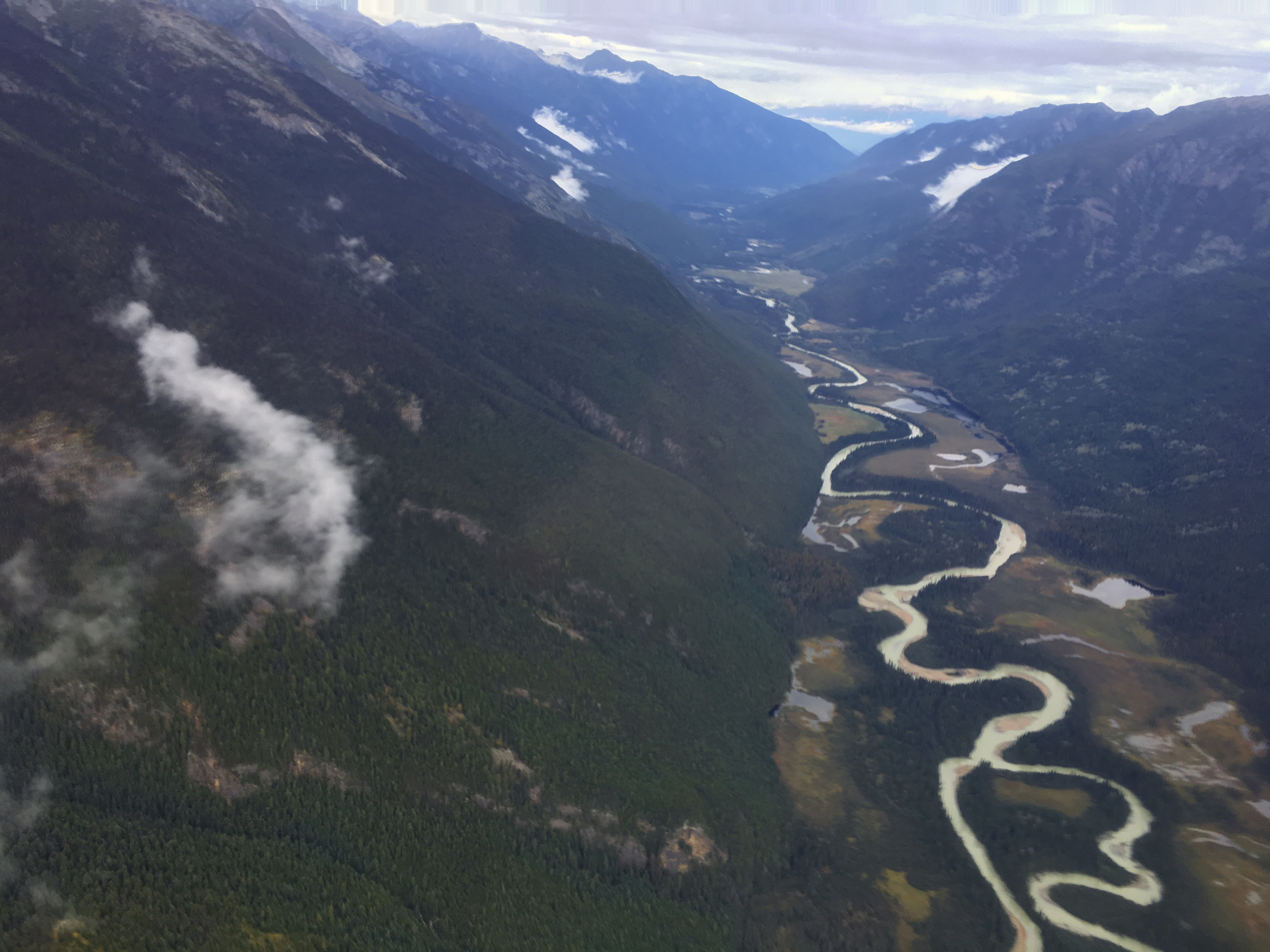

The Raush River is a tributary of the Fraser River in British Columbia, Canada. It drains a watershed of approximately 100,000 hectares (250,000 acres) on the eastern flanks of the Cariboo Mountains, a sub-range of the Columbia Mountains.

The river joins the Fraser near the community of Dunster in the Robson Valley.

The river's name is the result of a transcription error; it was originally called the Rivière au Shuswap, this was recorded on some maps as R.auSh., which then became Raush on official maps.

Its source is the Raush Glacier, and major tributary creeks include Black Martin and Quanstrom.

Two areas of the river are protected: the Lower Raush Protected Area protects 1,279 hectares (3,160 acres) near the river's mouth, while the Upper Raush Protected Area covers 5,582 hectares (13,790 acres) of its upper reaches. More than 50 kilometers of the river are navigable, and are used by kayakers, canoeists, and jetboaters.

== See also ==
- List of rivers of British Columbia
