= Wavy Range =

Small mountain range east of Murtle Lake

Wavy Ridge
- Location within British Columbia

Geography
- Country: Canada
- Region: British Columbia
- Range coordinates: 52°12′N 119°36′W
- Parent range: Cariboo Mountains

The Wavy Range is a small mountain range east of Murtle Lake in east-central British Columbia, Canada. It has an area of 102 km^{2} and is a subrange of the Cariboo Mountains which in turn form part of the Columbia Mountains.

== See also ==
- List of mountain ranges
- "Wavy Range". BC Geographical Names. Government of British Columbia – B.C. Geographical Names Office (BCGNO).
