= Mount Sir Mackenzie Bowell =

Mountain in British Columbia, Canada

Mount Sir MacKenzie Bowell is a 3,301 m (10,830 ft) mountain peak located at co-ordinates in the Premier Range of the Cariboo Mountains in the east-central interior of British Columbia, Canada. The mountain is located between the Kiwa and Tete glaciers.

The name honours the fifth Prime Minister of Canada, Sir Mackenzie Bowell, who died in 1917. It was one of the first mountains in the Premier Range to be named after a Prime Minister, receiving its designation on September 6, 1927. It was originally named Mount Welcome by the Carpe-Chamberlin climbing party in 1924.
