= Mount Stanley Baldwin =

Mountain in British Columbia, Canada

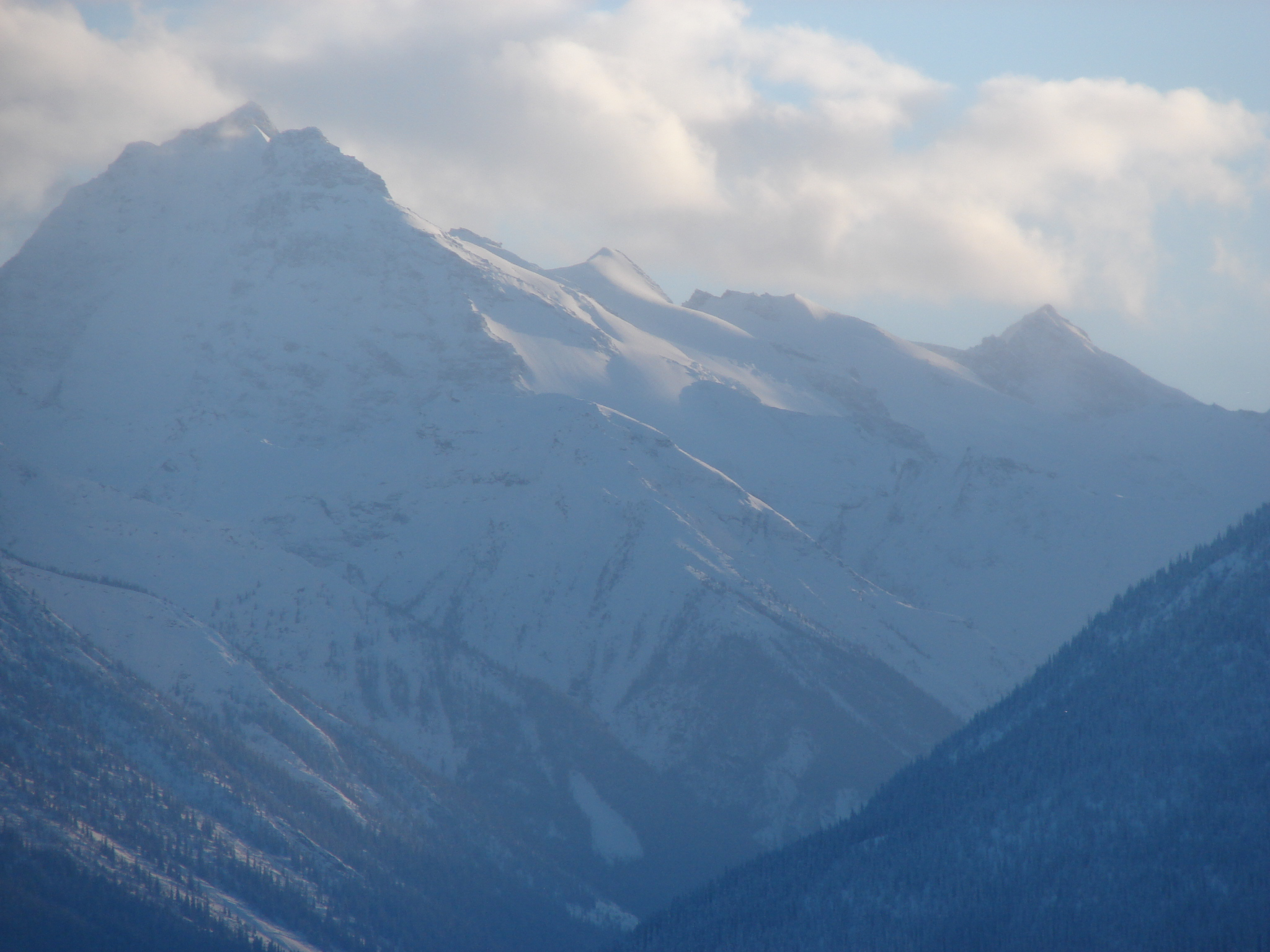

Highest point
- Elevation: 3,256 m (10,682 ft)
- Prominence: 511 m (1,677 ft)
- Listing: Mountains of British Columbia
- Coordinates: 52°49′28″N 119°36′21″W

Geography
- Location within British Columbia
- Location: British Columbia, Canada
- District: Cariboo Land District
- Parent range: Premier Range
- Topo map: NTS 83D13 Kiwa Creek

Mount Stanley Baldwin is a mountain located in the Premier Range of the Cariboo Mountains in the east-central interior of British Columbia, Canada. The mountain is located at the head of the Gilmour Glacier. It was originally named Mount Challenger by Allen Carpé during his 1924 ascent of the mountain.

The name honours the British prime minister Stanley Baldwin who made an official visit to British Columbia in 1927, the year in which the Premier Range was dedicated and the mountain was renamed. Although the Range was originally meant to honour both British and Canadian heads of government, Stanley Baldwin is the only British prime minister to be so honoured. Recent restrictions upon naming Canadian geographic features after non-Canadian citizens make it likely that he will be the last.
