= Premier Range =

Mountain range in British Columbia, Canada

- Premier Group
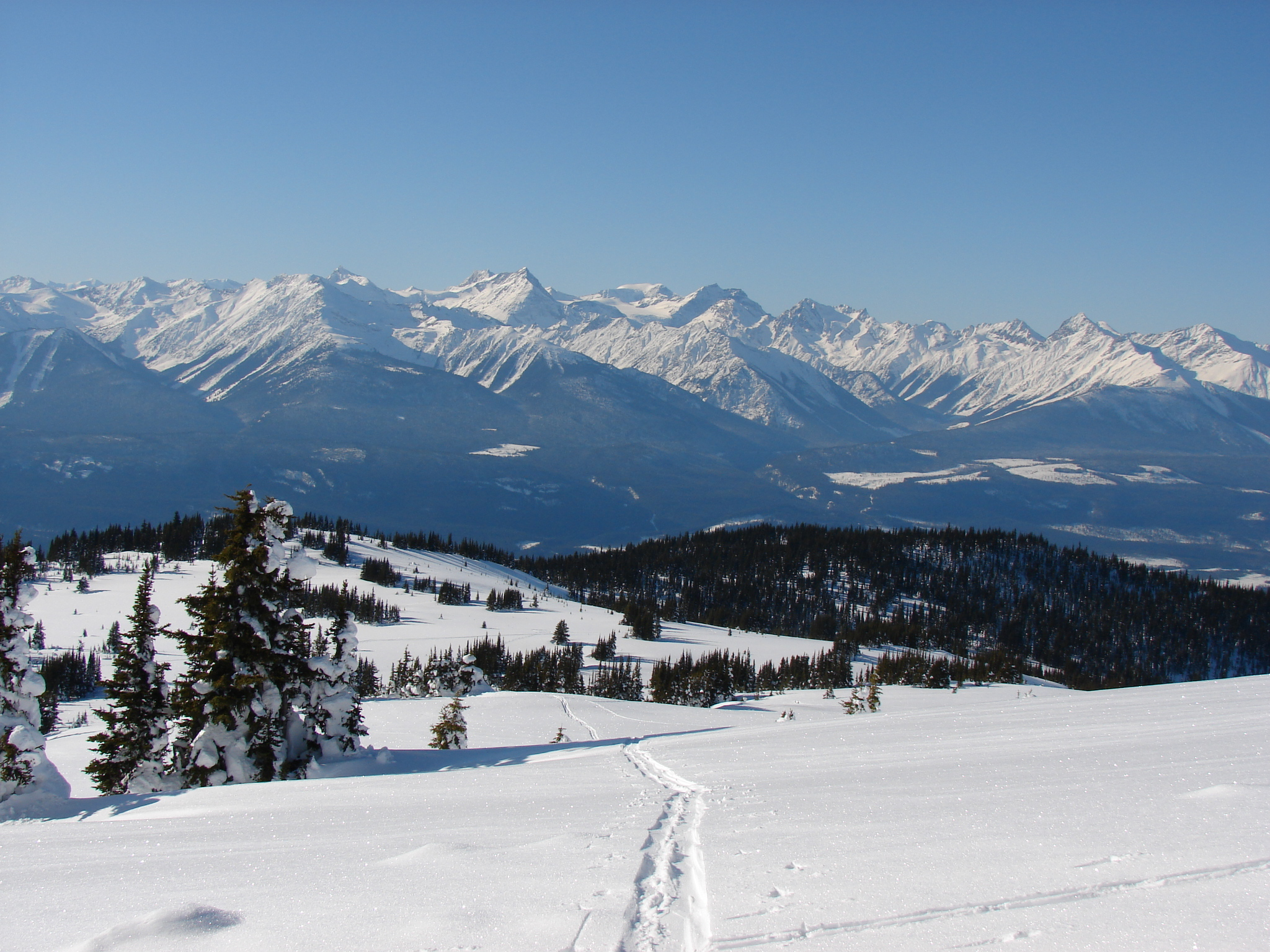

Highest point
- Peak: Mount Sir Wilfrid Laurier
- Elevation: 3,516 m (11,535 ft)
- Coordinates: 52°48′05″N 119°43′54″W

Geography
- Location within British Columbia
- Country: Canada
- Province: British Columbia
- Range coordinates: 52°45′N 119°33′W
- Parent range: Cariboo Mountains

The Premier Range is a group of mountains within the Cariboo Mountains of east-central British Columbia, Canada. The range (also known as the Premier Group) is bounded by the Raush River and Kiwa Creek to the north, the North Thompson River on the south and west and the Fraser River and its tributaries to the east.

In 1927, the year of Canada's Diamond Jubilee, it was decided that the names of the higher peaks in this range would be reserved to pay tribute to prime ministers of Canada, prime ministers of the United Kingdom, and premiers of the province of British Columbia. In practice, however, only one British prime minister and one British Columbia premier have been so honoured, and recent changes to Canadian geographic naming regulations make it unlikely that any British prime minister or other non-Canadian will receive such an honour in the future.

The named summits of the Premier Range are, in order of elevation:

Mountain	Height (m)	Height (ft)	Naming	Coordinates
Mount Sir Wilfrid Laurier	3516	11535	Sir Wilfrid Laurier - 7th Prime Minister	52°48′05″N 119°43′54″W
Mount Sir John Abbott	3398	11148	Sir John Abbott - 3rd Prime Minister	52°48.6′N 119°47.7′W
Mount Sir John Thompson	3349	10988	Sir John Thompson - 4th Prime Minister	52°44′N 119°44′W
Mount Sir Mackenzie Bowell	3301	10830	Sir Mackenzie Bowell - 5th Prime Minister	52°49′54″N 119°43′48″W
Mount Stanley Baldwin	3256	10682	Stanley Baldwin - British Prime Minister	52°49′28″N 119°36′21″W
Mount Mackenzie King	3234	10610	Mackenzie King - 10th Prime Minister	52°46′32.9″N 119°45′02.9″W
Mount Arthur Meighen	3205	10515	Arthur Meighen - 9th Prime Minister	52°48′11.9″N 119°33′11.9″W
Mount Richard Bennett	3190	10466	Richard Bennett - 11th Prime Minister	52°49′48″N 119°47′36″W
Mount John Oliver	3123	10246	John Oliver - B.C. Premier	52°53′00″N 119°41′06″W
Mount Lester Pearson	3086	10125	Lester B. Pearson - 14th Prime Minister	52°46′48″N 119°32′42″W
Mount Louis Saint Laurent	3045	9990	Louis St. Laurent - 12th Prime Minister	52°45′34″N 119°47′07″W
Mount Pierre Elliott Trudeau	2640	8661	Pierre Trudeau - 15th Prime Minister	52°48′10″N 119°25′31″W
Mount Sir Allan MacNab	2297	7535	Sir Allan MacNab - Premier of the colonial-era Province of Canada	52°31′12″N 119°12′11″W

Before the Premier Range was selected, many mountains outside this area were named after Canadian prime ministers. Mount Mackenzie, Mount Tupper, Mount Macdonald and Mount Laurier rise over the Canadian Pacific Railway tracks that travel through the Rogers Pass near Golden, British Columbia. Mount Robert in the Coast Mountains of British Columbia honours Sir Robert Borden. There is also a Mount John Diefenbaker in British Columbia named after John Diefenbaker. Other than Laurier (who was also honoured with the name of a mountain in Yukon), none of these prime ministers have received the honour of also having a mountain named for them in the Premier Range.

== See also ==
- Mica Mountain
