= Valemount =

- Village
- Village of Valemount
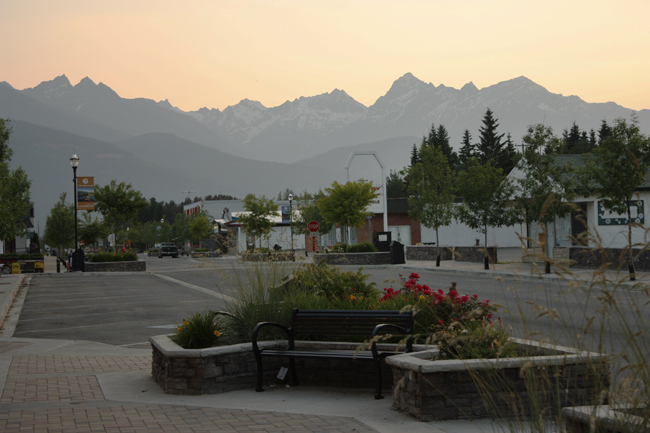
- Looking West on 5th Ave downtown Valemount, BC

- Logo
- Motto: Let the mountains move you
- Location of Valemount in British Columbia
- Coordinates: 52°49′52″N 119°16′34″W
- Country: Canada
- Province: British Columbia
- Regional district: Fraser-Fort George
- Incorporated: 13 December 1962

Government
  - Type: Mayor–council government
  - Mayor: Owen Torgerson
  - Village of Valemount Council: List of councillors: Hollie Blanchette; Sheri Gee; Donnie MacLean; Pete Pearson

Area
  - Total: 5.17 km^{2} (2.00 sq mi)
- Elevation: 792 m (2,598 ft)

Population (2021)
  - Total: 1,052
  - Density: 203/km^{2} (527/sq mi)
- Time zone: UTC−7 (Pacific Time)
- Forward sortation area: V0E 2Z0
- Area codes: 250, 778, 236
- Highways: Highway 5
- Waterways: Fraser River
- Website: valemount.ca

Valemount is a village municipality of 1,052 people in east central British Columbia, Canada, 320 kilometres (200 mi) from Kamloops, British Columbia. It is between the Rocky, Monashee, and Cariboo Mountains. It is the nearest community to the west of Jasper National Park, and is also the nearest community to Mount Robson Provincial Park, which features Mount Robson, the tallest mountain in the Canadian Rockies. Outdoor recreation is popular in summer and winter—hiking, skiing, snowmobiling, cross-country skiing, mountain biking and horseback riding are common activities. Valemount is one of 14 designated resort municipalities in British Columbia.

The name Valemount was coined for the Canadian National Railway station there in 1927 from the words vale and mount.

== History ==
In 1950, the Canoe River train crash occurred south of Valemount Station.

Valemount was incorporated as a village under the Municipal Act (now Community Charter), on December 13, 1962. Until the construction of the Yellowhead Highway 5 in the 1960s, Valemount's population was small and mostly itinerant. Road conditions were poor in the wintertime and electric power unreliable.

=== Expansion and growth in the 1970s ===
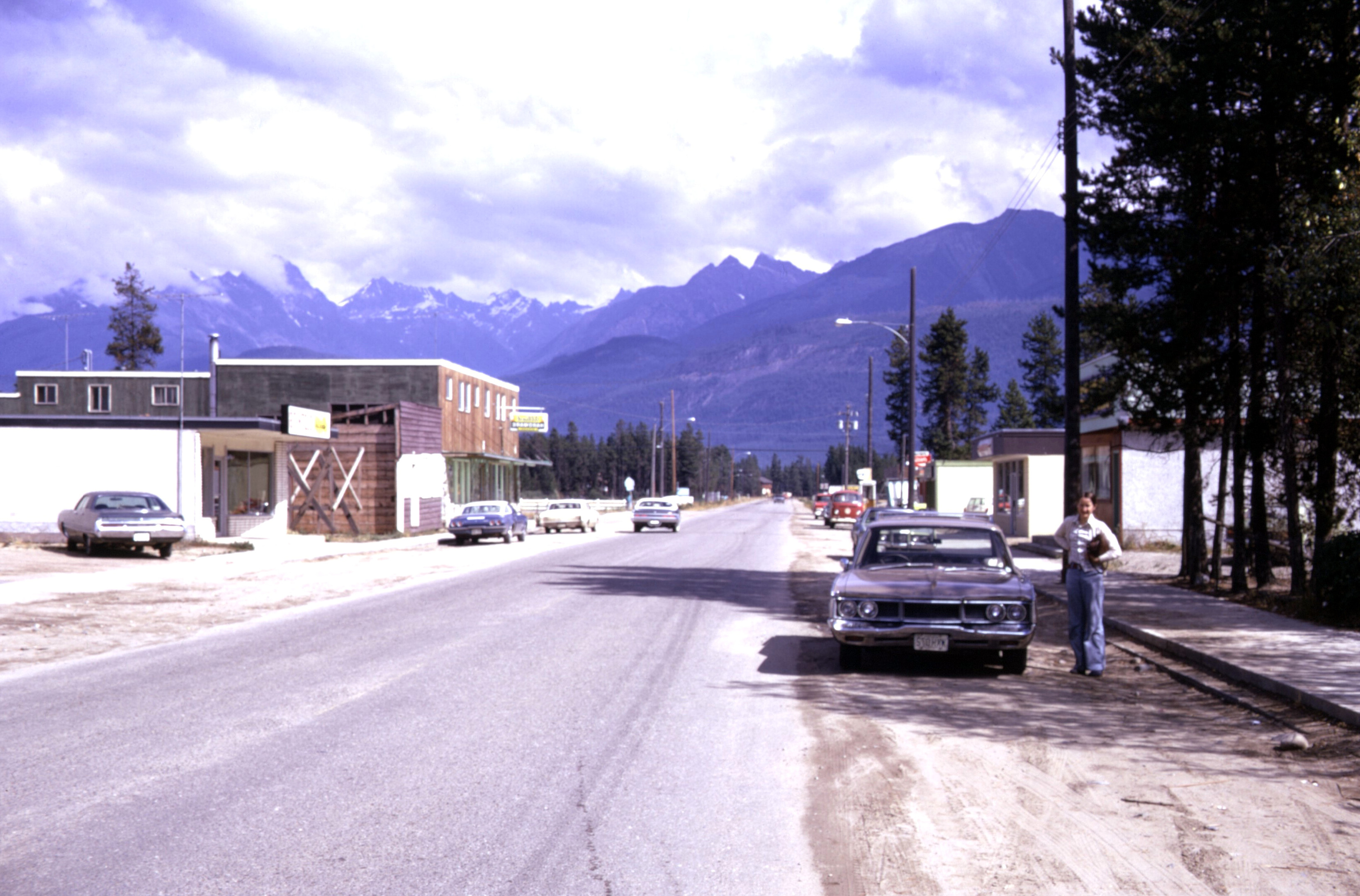
Valemount in 1974

Valemount's population increased from 600 people to 693, and from 693 people to 1,160 in the 1970s. The sewer system was completed in 1975, a water tower of 300,000 gallons started to service the town in 1977, a clinic opened in 1978, and a new Community Hall was inaugurated in February 1979. A shopping mall (1978) and several hotels on Highway 5 were completed in the late 1970s.

=== Valemount in the 1980s ===
In the 1980s population growth slowed. In 1980, work began at the Starratt Wildlife Sanctuary with a clean-up operation at an old dumpsite. The Canoe Robson Education Development Association (CREDA) was founded in 1984 to assist local residents with continued education and training. Canyon Creek Forestry Products was replaced by Clearwater Timber Industries which employed 400 people between Clearwater and Valemount. After two mill crises in 1984 and 1986, Clearwater Timber Industries went bankrupt and was purchased by Slocan Forest Products in May 1987.

=== Peak of lumber production in the 1990s ===
The mill was closed for part of 1991–1992 but reached a period of peak production between 1993 and 1996 when three shifts were employed full-time (160 employees). The population increased in these five years by 17 percent. In 1998, Slocan reduced its work force by two thirds and by 2001 the local population had dropped by 7.7 percent. The sawmill, which was shut down by Slocan and then acquired by Carrier Lumber, never met its former production or employment levels, and closed permanently in 2006.

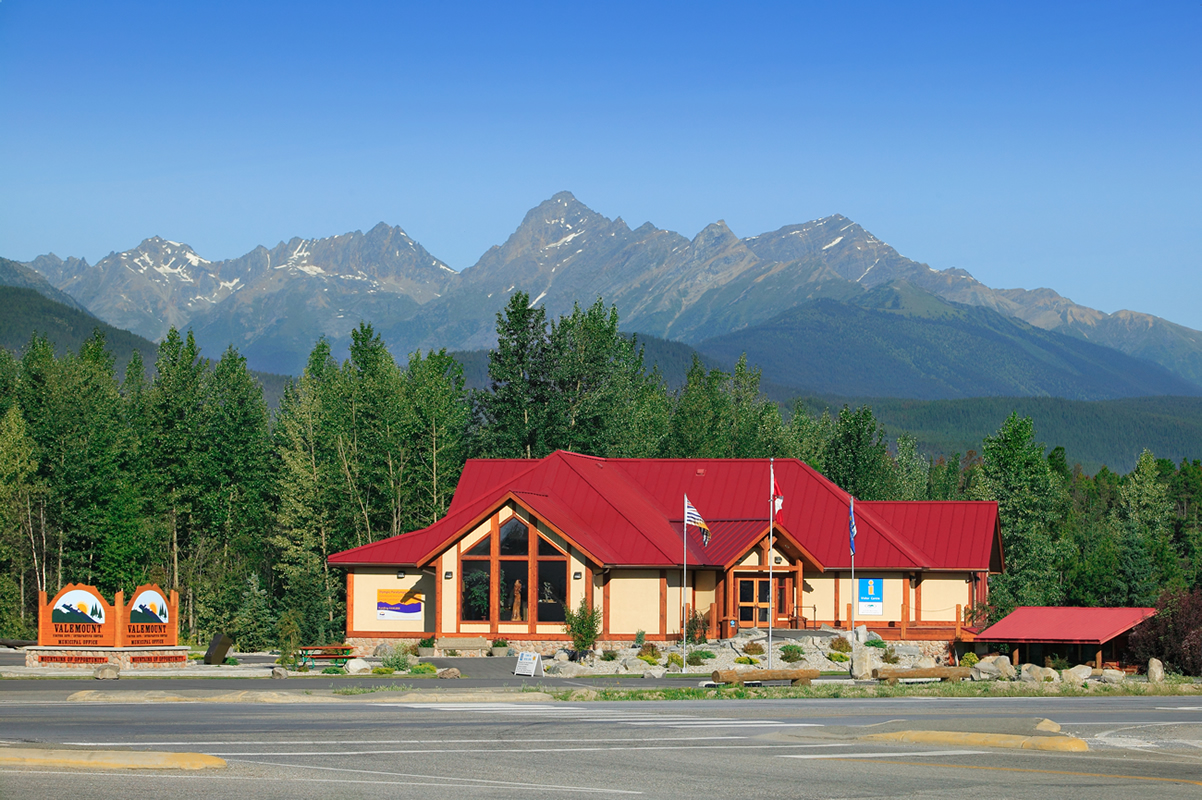
Valemount Visitor Information Centre

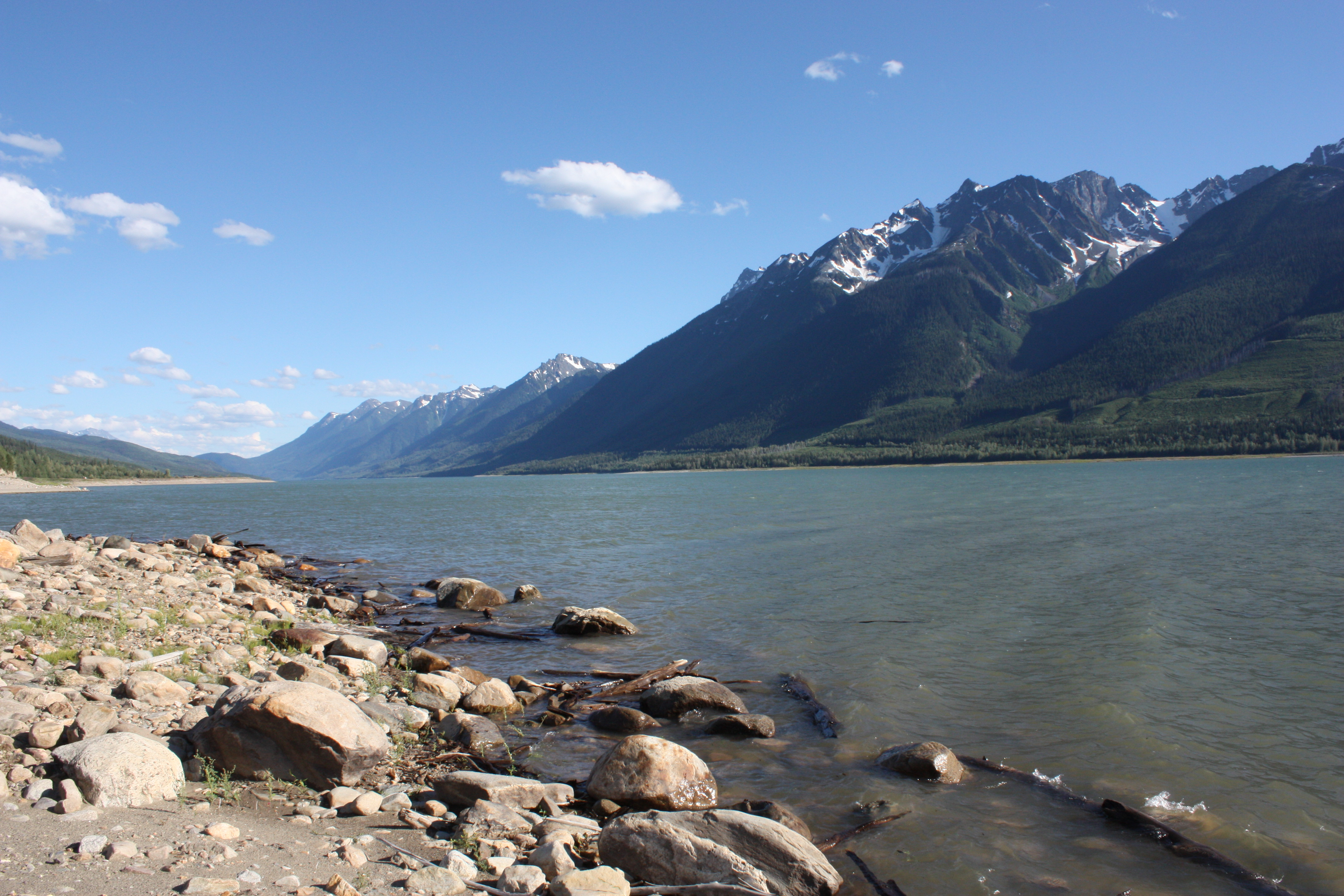
Kinbasket Lake

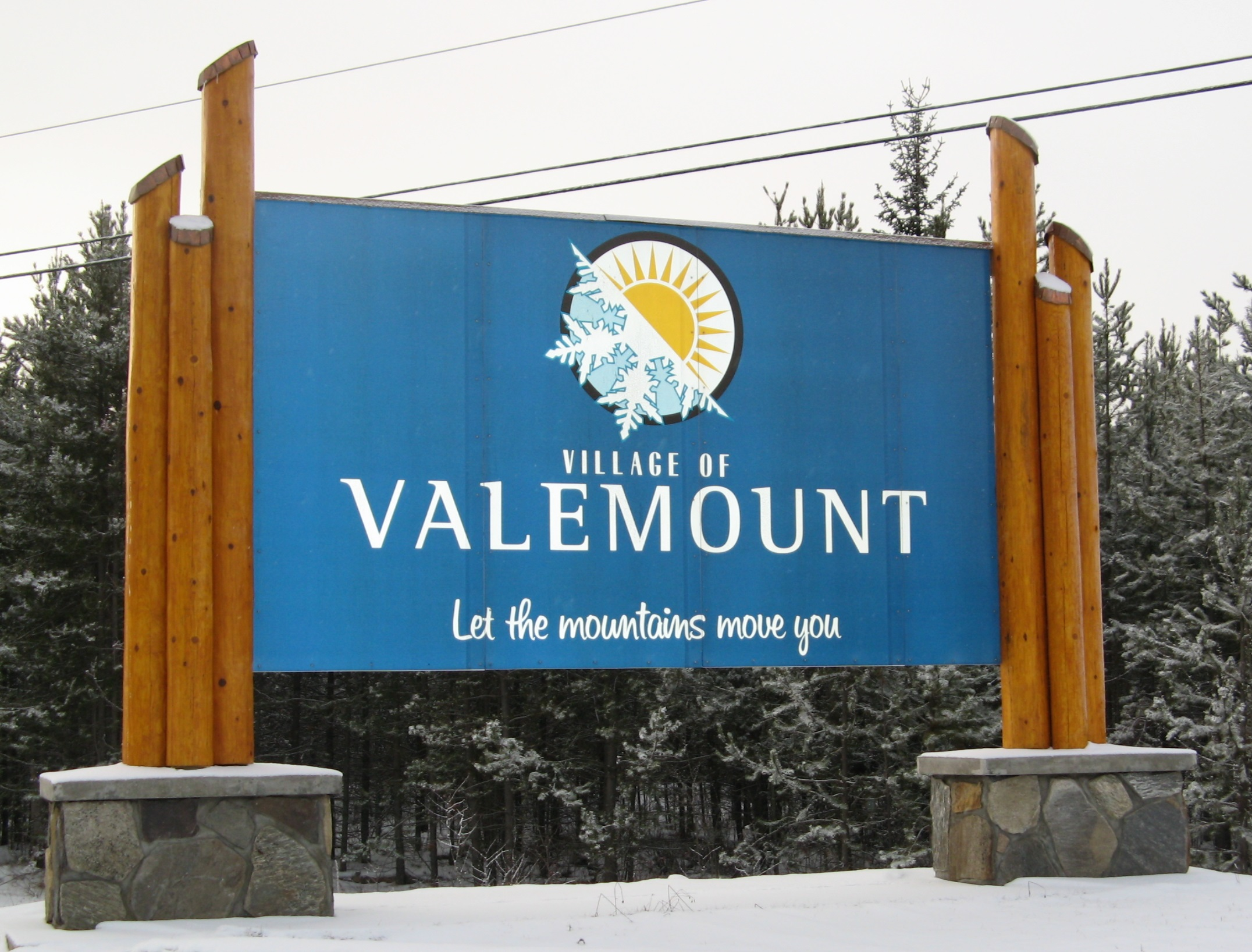
Welcome sign

=== Improvement and expansion of village infrastructure ===
All streets in the village were paved between 1993 and 2000. Major projects, such as the Curling Rink and the Arena, were completed or renovated, and the airport terminal was completed in 1996. In 1995, Valemount was invited to join the Columbia Basin Trust, created by the Columbia Basin Trust Act to benefit the region most adversely affected by the Columbia River Treaty. The Mica Dam had been completed by 1974 and the whole Canoe River Basin flooded. In 1997, the one-person office of CREDA grew into a busy Valemount Learning Centre; since then, the Valemount Learning Centre has been employing three full-time and three part-time staff, who provide various training and employment services to Valemount's residents.

=== 21st century ===
Valemount has high speed wireless internet, train, bus and highway service. The village has one weekly newspaper, The Rocky Mountain Goat News, locally owned and based in Valemount. It covers the communities of Valemount, McBride, Dunster, Tête-Jaune, and to a lesser extent Jasper and Blue River. The Goat was named the top newspaper in its circulation category in 2015 by the BC Yukon Community Newspapers Association.

Borealis Geopower obtained three permits October 27, 2010, to explore the Canoe Reach area of Kinbasket Lake south of Valemount for geothermal development. It is the second region of B.C. opened up to geothermal exploration.

Valemount has increased its infrastructure capacity by adding a second water tower (300,000 imp gal or 1,400 m^{3}) in 2003, and now has a water treatment plant.

A wireless wide-area network was established in September 1999 centred in Valemount and covering a three-kilometre radius area. ADSL service has been available since 2003, and cell phone service (only some providers) since July 2004. High-speed Internet services were available in rural areas by 2005.

== Demographics ==
In the 2021 Census of Population conducted by Statistics Canada, Valemount had a population of 1,052 living in 513 of its 602 total private dwellings, a change of 3% from its 2016 population of 1,021. With a land area of 5.16 km^{2} (1.99 sq mi), it had a population density of 203.9/km^{2} (528.0/sq mi) in 2021.

== Climate ==
Cariboo Lodge is a weather station about 20 km (12 mi) south-west of Valemount. It lies below Mount Sir Wilfrid Laurier in the valley of the Canoe River (British Columbia). Cariboo Lodge has a subarctic climate (Köppen Dfc).

Climate data for Cariboo Lodge, BC (1981-2010): 1096m
Month	Jan	Feb	Mar	Apr	May	Jun	Jul	Aug	Sep	Oct	Nov	Dec	Year
Record high °C (°F)	7.8 (46.0)	10.0 (50.0)	14.0 (57.2)	20.0 (68.0)	30.0 (86.0)	30.5 (86.9)	35.0 (95.0)	31.0 (87.8)	29.0 (84.2)	20.5 (68.9)	10.5 (50.9)	10.0 (50.0)	35.0 (95.0)
Mean daily maximum °C (°F)	−5.5 (22.1)	−2.5 (27.5)	2.8 (37.0)	8.2 (46.8)	13.9 (57.0)	18.2 (64.8)	20.7 (69.3)	20.4 (68.7)	14.4 (57.9)	5.8 (42.4)	−1.8 (28.8)	−5.8 (21.6)	7.4 (45.3)
Daily mean °C (°F)	−8.1 (17.4)	−5.7 (21.7)	−1.7 (28.9)	2.9 (37.2)	7.8 (46.0)	12.0 (53.6)	14.1 (57.4)	13.7 (56.7)	9.0 (48.2)	2.5 (36.5)	−4.2 (24.4)	−8.4 (16.9)	2.8 (37.1)
Mean daily minimum °C (°F)	−10.6 (12.9)	−8.9 (16.0)	−6.2 (20.8)	−2.4 (27.7)	1.7 (35.1)	5.7 (42.3)	7.6 (45.7)	6.9 (44.4)	3.5 (38.3)	−0.9 (30.4)	−6.6 (20.1)	−10.9 (12.4)	−1.8 (28.8)
Record low °C (°F)	−35.0 (−31.0)	−37.5 (−35.5)	−31.1 (−24.0)	−17.0 (1.4)	−8.3 (17.1)	−2.0 (28.4)	−4.0 (24.8)	−5.0 (23.0)	−6.0 (21.2)	−25.0 (−13.0)	−36.0 (−32.8)	−36.0 (−32.8)	−37.5 (−35.5)
Average precipitation mm (inches)	123.9 (4.88)	85.1 (3.35)	87.1 (3.43)	43.4 (1.71)	53.9 (2.12)	71.5 (2.81)	72.4 (2.85)	75.2 (2.96)	74.7 (2.94)	119.7 (4.71)	144.8 (5.70)	109.1 (4.30)	1,060.8 (41.76)
Average snowfall cm (inches)	117.5 (46.3)	79.1 (31.1)	69.3 (27.3)	18.0 (7.1)	2.4 (0.9)	0.0 (0.0)	0.0 (0.0)	0.0 (0.0)	0.7 (0.3)	23.4 (9.2)	114.3 (45.0)	107.2 (42.2)	531.9 (209.4)
Source: Environment Canada

== Transportation ==
As a flag stop Via Rail's The Canadian calls at the Valemount railway station two or three times (depending on the season) per week in each direction.

Services
- Preceding station	Via Rail	Following station
  Blue River toward Vancouver	The Canadian	Jasper toward Toronto

== Media ==
Valemount is one of seven communities in English-speaking Canada with a license to broadcast over the air community television. The station is commonly referred to as VCTV within the community. In the event of a prolonged power outage or similar catastrophe where traditional communications are impossible or impractical, the society owning the station can use FM radio to provide critical messages to the people of Valemount.

== See also ==
- Cranberry Marsh/Starratt Wildlife Management Area - just south of Valemount
