= Kiwa Creek =

Watercourse in British Columbia, Canada

Coordinates: 53°01′18″N 119°33′51″W

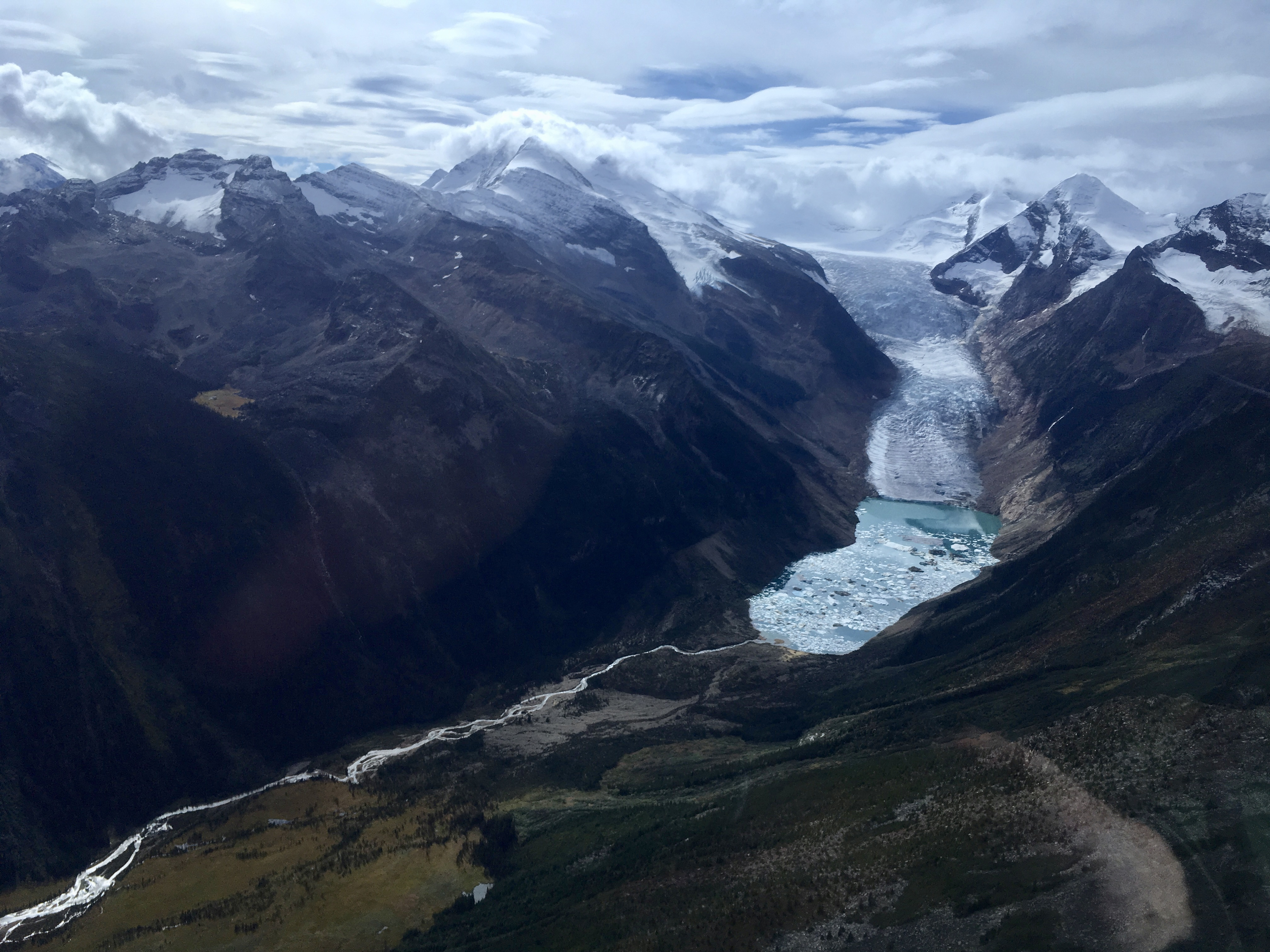
Kiwa Glacier, in Premier Range, with Mount Sir Richard Bennet at right and Mount Sir Mackenzie Bowell at left.

Kiwa Creek is a tributary of the Fraser River that extends from its source at Kiwa Glacier in the Cariboo Mountains to its confluence with the Fraser near Tête Jaune Cache, British Columbia. It is named from the Secwepemc word for "crooked".

== See also ==
- List of rivers of British Columbia
