= Cariboo Mountains =

Mountain range in British Columbia, Canada

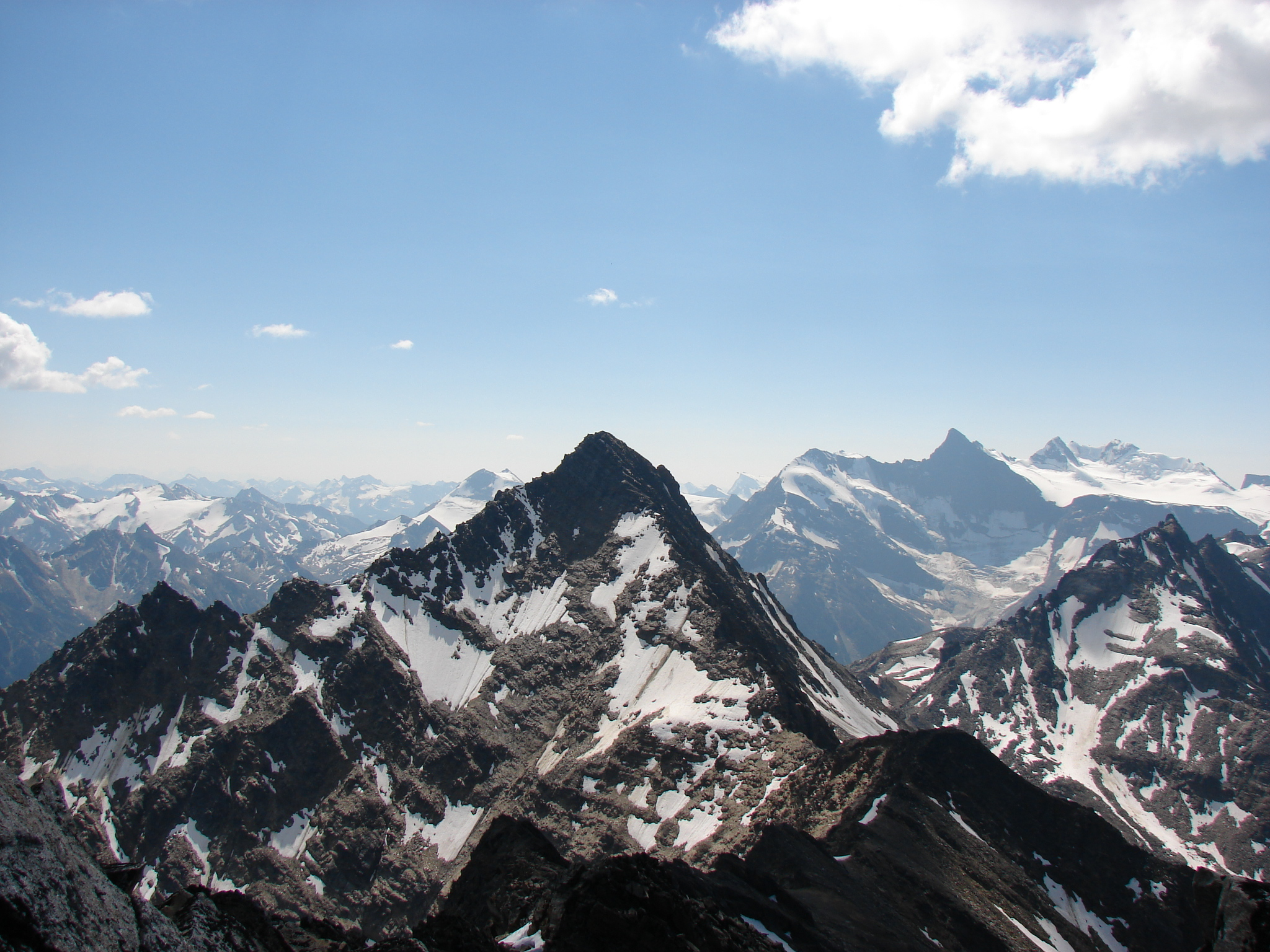
- Peaks in the Premier Range

Highest point
- Peak: Mount Sir Wilfrid Laurier
- Elevation: 3,516 m (11,535 ft)
- Coordinates: 52°48′05″N 119°43′54″W

Dimensions
- Length: 245 km (152 mi) SE-NW
- Width: 90 km (56 mi) SW-NE
- Area: 7,700 km^{2} (3,000 mi^{2})

Geography
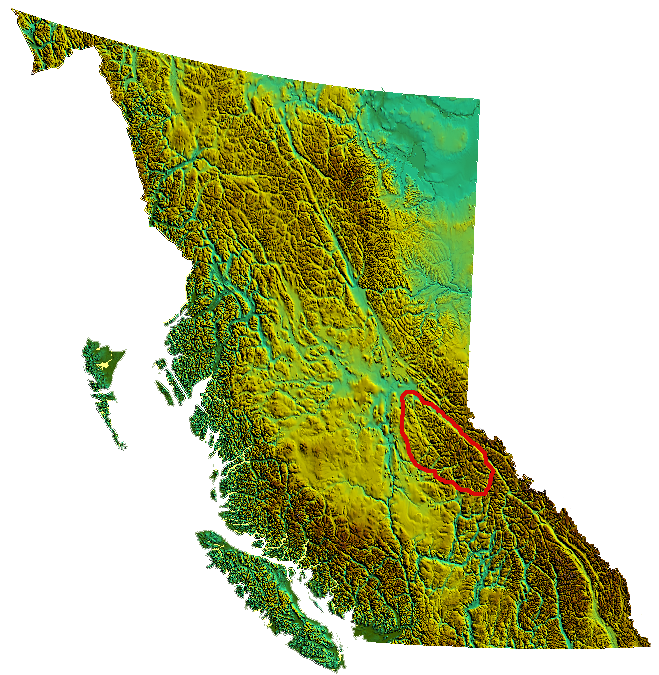
- Location map of the Cariboo Mountains
- Country: Canada
- Province: British Columbia
- Range coordinates: 52°55′N 120°15′W
- Parent range: Columbia Mountains

The Cariboo Mountains are the northernmost subrange of the Columbia Mountains, which run south into the Spokane area of the United States and include the Selkirks, Monashees and Purcells. The Cariboo Mountains are entirely within the province of British Columbia, Canada. The range is 7,700 square kilometres (3,000 sq mi) in area and about 245 km in length (southeast–northwest) and about 90 km at its widest (southwest–northeast).

== Physical geography ==
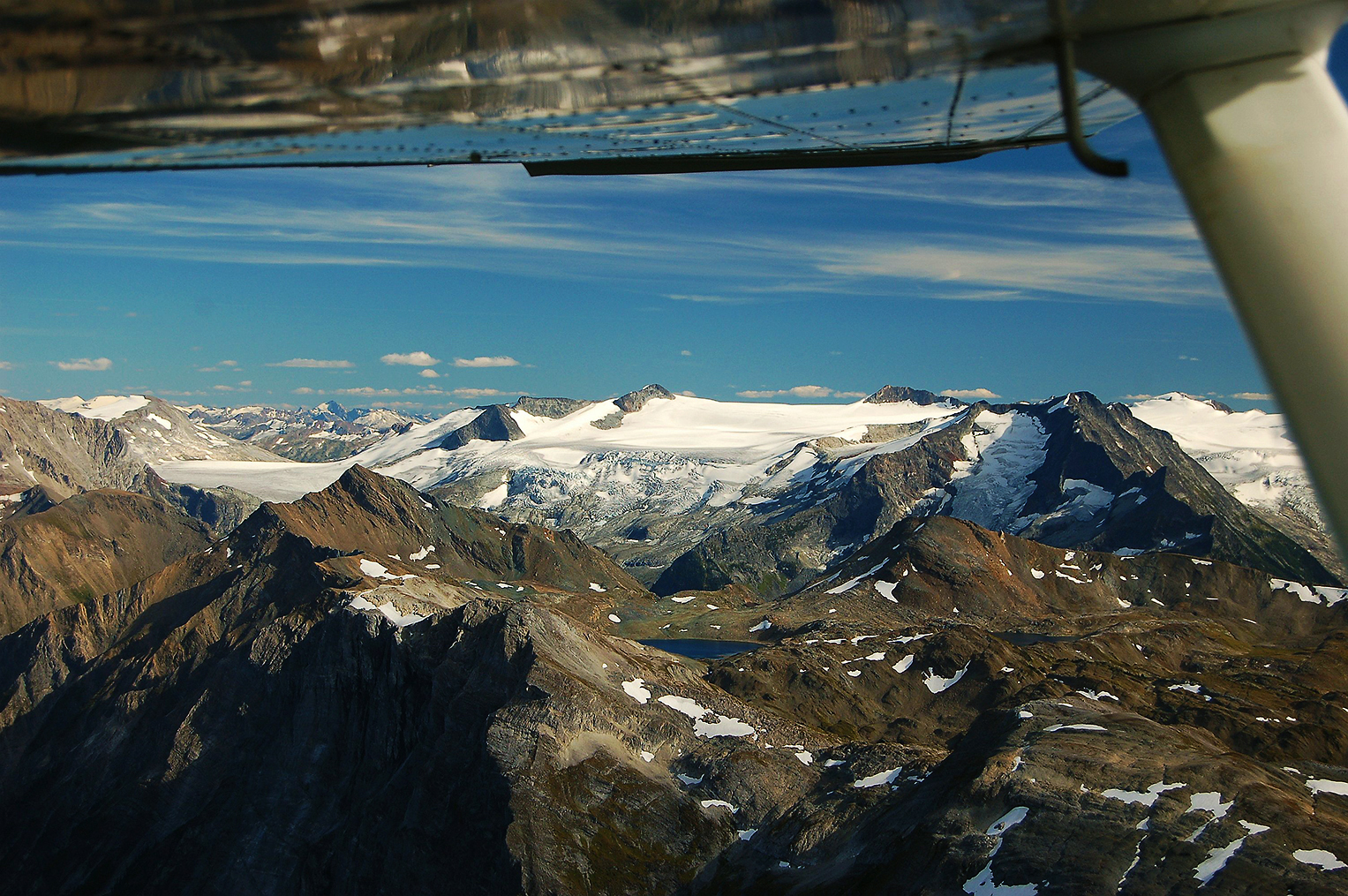
Braithwaite Icefield, largest in the Cariboo Mountains

East of the range is the Rocky Mountain Trench, in this region largely the path of the upper Fraser River (including the section known as the Grand Canyon of the Fraser which is not to be confused with the better-known Fraser Canyon nearer Vancouver). To the west the range verges with the Cariboo Plateau through an intermediary "foothill" area known as the Quesnel Highland. Northwestwards the range drops to the Willow River area of the Nechako Plateau, which lies around Prince George. South of the range, northeast of Clearwater a plateau-like mountainous area between the range and the North Thompson River is part of the Shuswap Highland, which crosses the North Thompson and continues into the Shuswap Lake area.

N.B. Some classification systems assign the Cariboo Mountains to the Cariboo Plateau, which also includes the small Marble and Clear Ranges but it is so large and so mountainous a range, with peaks that rival the highest in the Selkirks, that it does not warrant the "plateau" designation.

The Cariboo Mountains subranges include the Palmer Range and the Mowdish Range.

=== Watersheds and rivers ===
Unlike the other three major subranges of the Columbia Mountains, the Cariboo Mountains have almost no contact with the Columbia River or its tributaries, but are entirely bounded by the Fraser and its tributary, the North Thompson River (there is a small exception in the Canoe River, which runs into the Rocky Mountain Trench from the eastern end of the range. The Canoe River is on the north side of Albreda Pass, which is the divide between the North Thompson and the Rocky Mountain Trench.

=== High peaks ===
The highest summits in the range are in a group known as the Premier Range whose peaks carry the names of eleven Canadian Prime Ministers, one British Prime Minister, and one Premier of British Columbia. The highest peak is Mount Sir Wilfrid Laurier at 3,516 m (11,535 ft). The most recently added name to the group is that of Mount Pierre Elliott Trudeau.

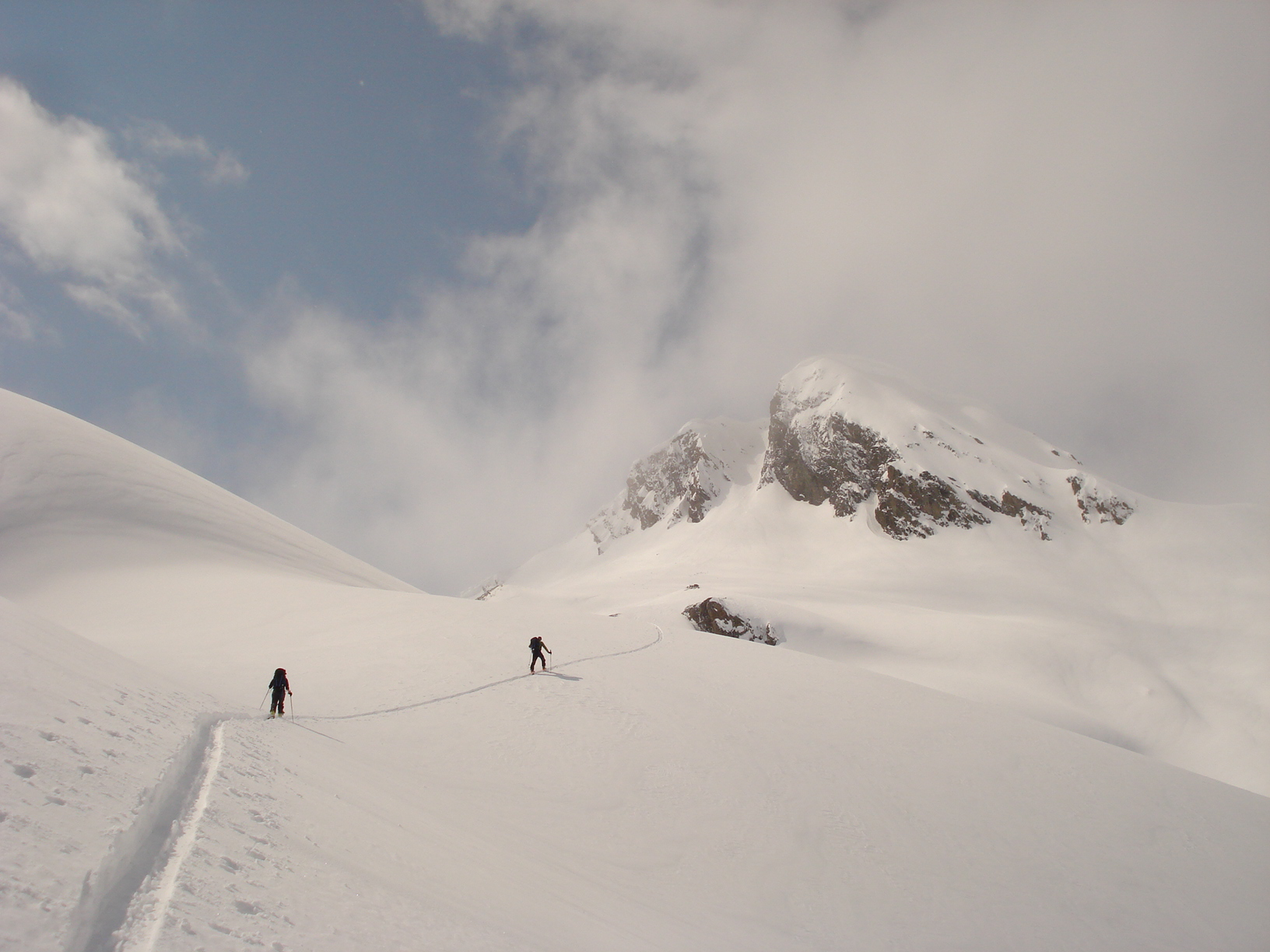
Backcountry skiing in the Cariboo Mountains

The highest peak in the Cariboo Mountains outside the Premiers Range is Quanstrom Mountain 3,038 m (9,967 ft), which is the northernmost peak in the range over 3,000 m.

== Sub-ranges ==
- Mowdish Range
- Premier Range
- Wavy Range

== Protected lands and parks ==
Much of the Cariboo Mountains lie in Wells Gray Provincial Park, created in 1939 and currently the 4th largest in British Columbia. Another section is in Bowron Lake Provincial Park, a popular canoeing circuit east of the preserved gold rush town of Barkerville. Another park in the range is Cariboo Mountains Provincial Park, between Wells Gray and Bowron Lake.
