= Jordan Range =

Mountain range in British Columbia, Canada

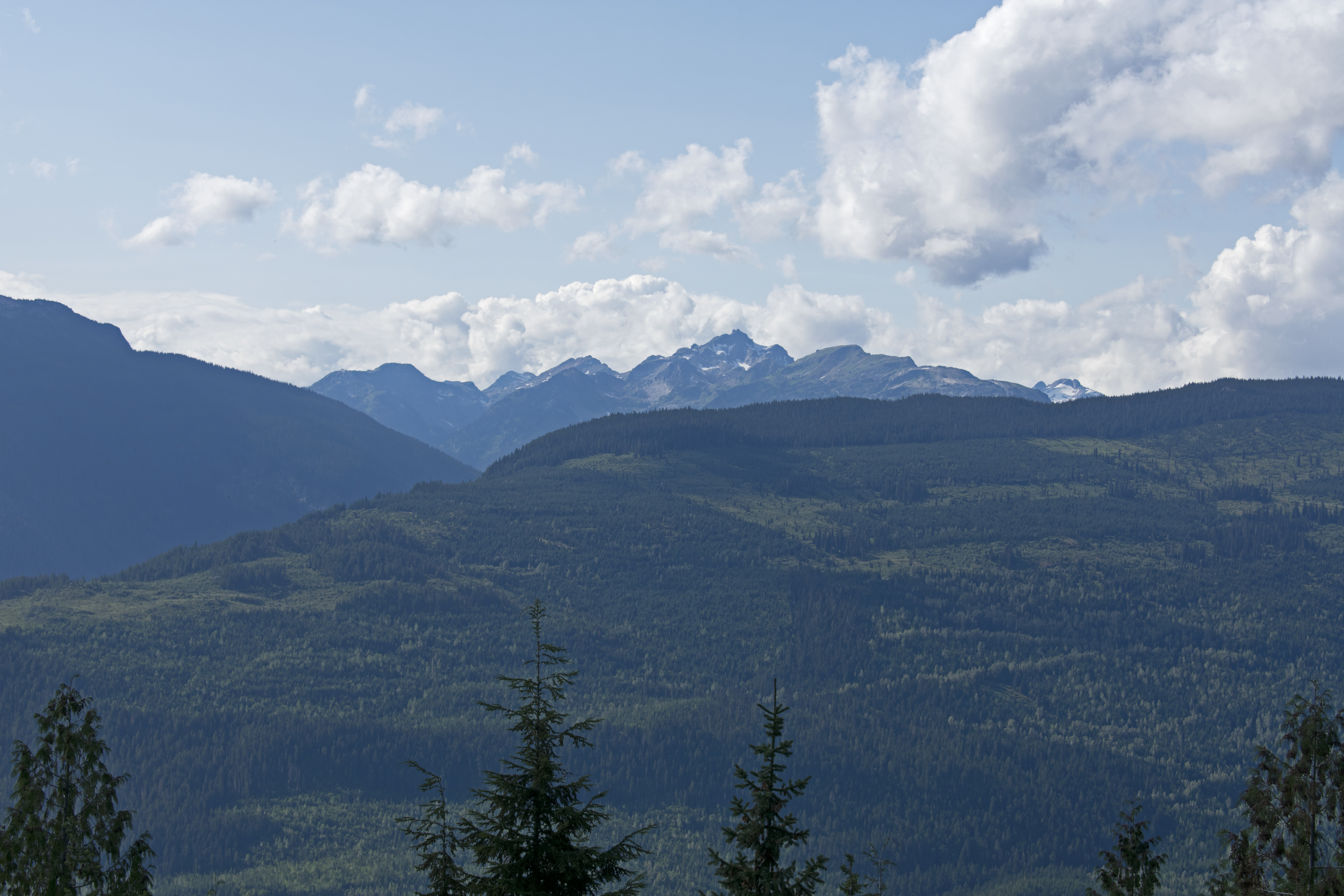
- The Jordan Range from Mount Revelstoke National Park

Geography
- Location within British Columbia
- Country: Canada
- Region: British Columbia
- Range coordinates: 51°12′N 118°25′W
- Parent range: Monashee Mountains

The Jordan Range is a mountain range in southeastern British Columbia, Canada, located northwest of Revelstoke, between the Columbia River and the Perry River, to the north of Three Valley Gap (the summit of Eagle Pass). It has an area of 634 km^{2} and is a subrange of the Monashee Mountains which in turn form part of the Columbia Mountains.

== See also ==
- List of mountain ranges
