= Joss Pass =

Mountain pass in British Columbia, Canada

- Location within British Columbia
- Elevation: 1,345 m (4,413 ft)

Third Approach
- Location: British Columbia, Canada
- Range: Monashee Mountains
- Coordinates: 50°50′00″N 118°25′00″W
- Topo map: NTS 82L16 Revelstoke

Joss Pass, 1345 m (4413 ft), is a mountain pass in the central Monashee Mountains of the Southern Interior of British Columbia, Canada. Located just south of the Three Valley Gap area of Eagle Pass, which is the route of the Trans-Canada Highway and the mainline of the Canadian Pacific Railway. It forms the divide between the headwaters of the Shuswap River and those of its eventual tributary Wap Creek, which joins the Shuswap via Mabel Lake. It forms the prominence col for Tsuius Mountain, the highest mountain of the Sawtooth Range, which is part of the Shuswap Highland. It is located just east of Joss Mountain, which is the northernmost peak of the Sawtooths.

== See also ==
- Joss (disambiguation)
- List of mountain passes
