= Purcell Wilderness Conservancy Provincial Park and Protected Area =

Provincial park in British Columbia, Canada

Purcell Wilderness Conservancy
- Purcell Wilderness Conservancy Provincial Park and Protected Area
- IUCN category Ib (wilderness area)
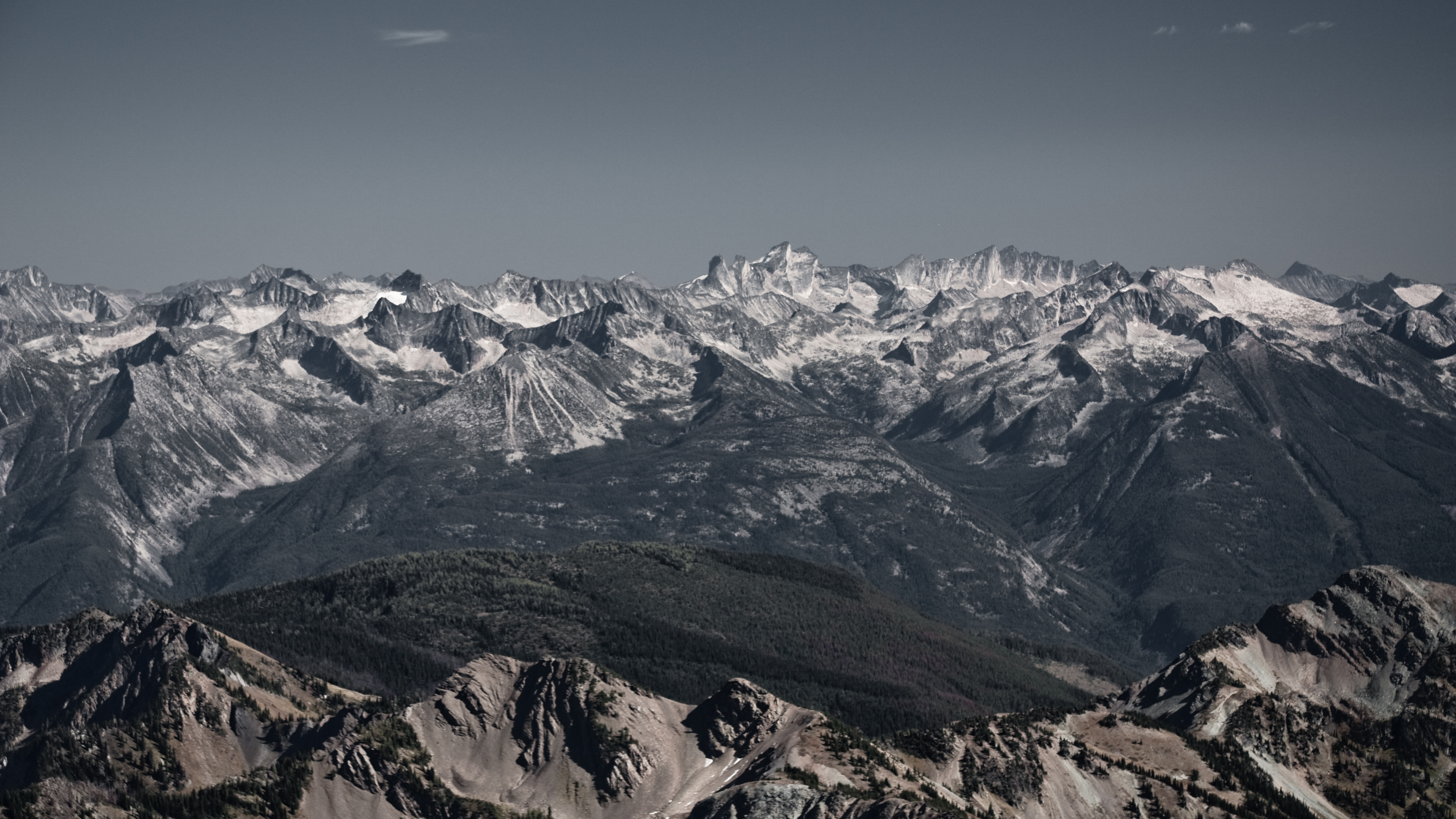
- The Leaning Towers Group
- Interactive map of Purcell Wilderness Conservancy
- Location: Purcells, Columbia Mountains
- Nearest city: Argenta, British Columbia, Invermere, British Columbia
- Coordinates: 50°09′00″N 116°32′00″W
- Area: 202,709 hectares (500,900 acres)
- Established: 1974
- Governing body: Province of British Coulumbia

The Purcell Wilderness Conservancy (full name Purcell Wilderness Conservancy Provincial Park and Protected Area) is a provincial park in British Columbia, Canada. It was established in 1974, and encompasses six large drainages in the Purcell Mountains in the southeast of the province. It contains high peaks, alpine meadows and ridges, deep creek and river valleys, and hot springs at Dewar Creek.

== History ==
The northern part of the park covers an important historical trade and transportation route used by First Nations people for centuries, linking the Rocky Mountain Trench and Kootenay Lake via Toby Pass. Albert Grey, 4th Earl Grey, Governor General of Canada, traveled the trail in 1908, after which it was named in his honour. Grey was impressed by the area and built a cabin on Toby Creek. He also approached Premier Richard McBride about protecting the area within a park, but the plans did not come about.

The region saw periods of mining activity, including the Argenta Mine near Hamill Peak. It operated for only one year in 1904 and 1905. Some of the equipment is still found inside the park. By the 1960s, logging had reached further into the Purcells. Area residents, outdoor clubs, and conservation groups lobbied the Provincial and Federal Governments for a park in the region. In 1974, the Purcell Wilderness Conservancy (PWC) was established, protecting 131,500 hectares (325,000 acres). The 9,164-hectare (22,640-acre) St. Mary's Alpine Provincial Park, adjacent to the southern boundary of the PWC, was established in the same year. The PWC was one of the first areas in Canada conserved because of citizen activism. In 1995, the PWC expanded to its current size and was named a Class A Provincial Park by the government.

== Geography ==
The Purcell Wilderness Conservancy covers the central region of the southern half of the Purcell Range in the south east of the province, often referred to as the Kootenays. The nearest settlements are Argenta, to the west, and Invermere to the east.

The park encompasses several large drainages in their entirety, and contains the headwaters of several other large streams and rivers. On the western side of the park, Hamill, Fry, and Carney Creeks flow into Kootenay Lake and the Kootenay River system. On the eastern side, Toby, Dutch, and Finlay Creeks flow into the Columbia River. St. Mary's River and Skookumchuck Creek flow from the south of the park, also into the Kootenay drainage. The mountainous park has many peaks and glaciers. The tallest peaks are Mount Hamill (3,274 metres (10,741 ft)), Mount Toby (3,222 metres (10,571 ft)), and Mount Truce (3,250 metres (10,660 ft)) in the north, and Mount Findlay (3,162 metres (10,374 ft)), near the centre of the park. The Toby Glacier (123 square kilometres (47 sq mi)) is in the north of the park, and forms the headwaters for Toby Creek.

=== Geology ===
The PWC region is composed of sedimentary, metamorphic and igneous rock, and contains some of the oldest rock in the province. Fossils can be found within the park. The oldest rock layer is from the Proterozoic period; this is interspersed with granitic intrusions, or batholiths, similar to the Bugaboos to the north. Some of the high peaks are a mix of granite or quartzite; these features are usually more massive and rounded. Other peaks are more pointed and abrupt, these are formed from slate rock. Much of the park shows the effects of glaciation. Hot springs are also present alongside Dewar Creek in the south of the park.

== Flora and fauna ==
The PWC contains five of British Columbia's biogeoclimatic zones. The wetter western portion of the park has Interior Cedar—Hemlock forests, while the drier eastern valleys feature both Ponderosa Pine and Interior Douglas-fir. The higher slopes are dominated by Engelmann Spruce—Subalpine Fir, which give way to the Alpine Tundra biome at the highest altitudes that support life.

Many large mammals are present in the park, including grizzly and black bears, mule and whitetail deer, moose, mountain caribou, and mountain goats. Biologists have identified 90 bird species within the park. The streams and rivers support Dolly Varden, rainbow and cutthroat trout, and mountain whitefish.

== Conservation ==
The PWC is preserved in its natural state; there are no roads or facilities beyond rough campgrounds within the park. Mechanized access, including helicopters, is prohibited. It is considered the largest intact ecosystem in southeastern B.C.
