= Sawtooth Range (British Columbia) =

Subrange in the country of Canada

Coordinates: 50°41′00″N 118°25′00″W

The Sawtooth Range is a subrange of the Shuswap Highland area of the central Monashee Mountains in the Southern Interior of British Columbia, Canada. It is located between Mabel Lake (W) and Sugar Lake (E) and bounded on the south by the upper Shuswap River. Its northern boundary is just south of the Three Valley Gap area of Eagle Pass, which is the route of the Canadian Pacific Railway mainline and the Trans-Canada Highway. To the east, across the uppermost Shuswap River above Sugar Lake, is the Gold Range of the main spine of the Monashees, to which it is connected by the col of Joss Pass. To the west, it is adjoined by the rest of the Shuswap Highland, of which it is a part and is an intermediary mountainous plateau between the Monashees and the northeastern Thompson Plateau.

Its highest summit is Tsuius Mountain, 2487 m (8159 ft) prominence: 1142 m.
