= Vimy (disambiguation) =

Vimy is a commune in the Pas-de-Calais department in the Nord-Pas-de-Calais region of France

Vimy may also refer to:

- Vimy, Alberta, hamlet in central Alberta, Canada
- Vimy (electoral district), Canadian federal electoral district in Quebec created by the 2012 federal electoral boundaries redistribution
- Canton of Vimy, previous canton in northern France, in the Pas-de-Calais département. It was disbanded following the French canton reorganisation which came into effect in March 2015
- Vimy (horse) a French Thoroughbred racehorse
- Vimy Memorial Bridge, previously the Strandherd-Armstrong Bridge, bridge in Ottawa, Ontario, Canada
- Vimy Foundation, Canadian charity focused on raising awareness of the role Canada played in World War I
- Vimy House, warehouse in western Ottawa, Canada, that used to store most of the collection of the Canadian War Museum
- Vimy, the mascot of the 2017 Invictus Games

== See also ==
- Vimy Ridge (British Columbia), mountain ridge in east-central British Columbia, Canada
- Battle of Vimy Ridge, a military engagement fought primarily as part of the Battle of Arras, in the Nord-Pas-de-Calais region of France, during the First World War
- Vickers Vimy, British heavy bomber aircraft of the First World War and post-First World War era
- Canadian National Vimy Memorial, a memorial site in France dedicated to the memory of Canadian Expeditionary Force members killed during the First World War
- Vimy Ridge Day, day to commemorate the deaths and casualties of members of the Canadian Corps during the First World War Battle of Vimy Ridge
- Vimy Award, award presented by the Conference of Defence Associations Institute (CDAI) to Canadians who has made a significant and outstanding contribution to the defence and security of Canada and the preservation of its democratic values
- HMS Vimy (D33), 1917 British V-class destroyer known as HMS Vancouver (1917), renamed HMS Vimy in April 1928
- HMCS Vimy, Battle class naval trawlers used by the Royal Canadian Navy
