= Anstey Range =

Mountain range in British Columbia, Canada

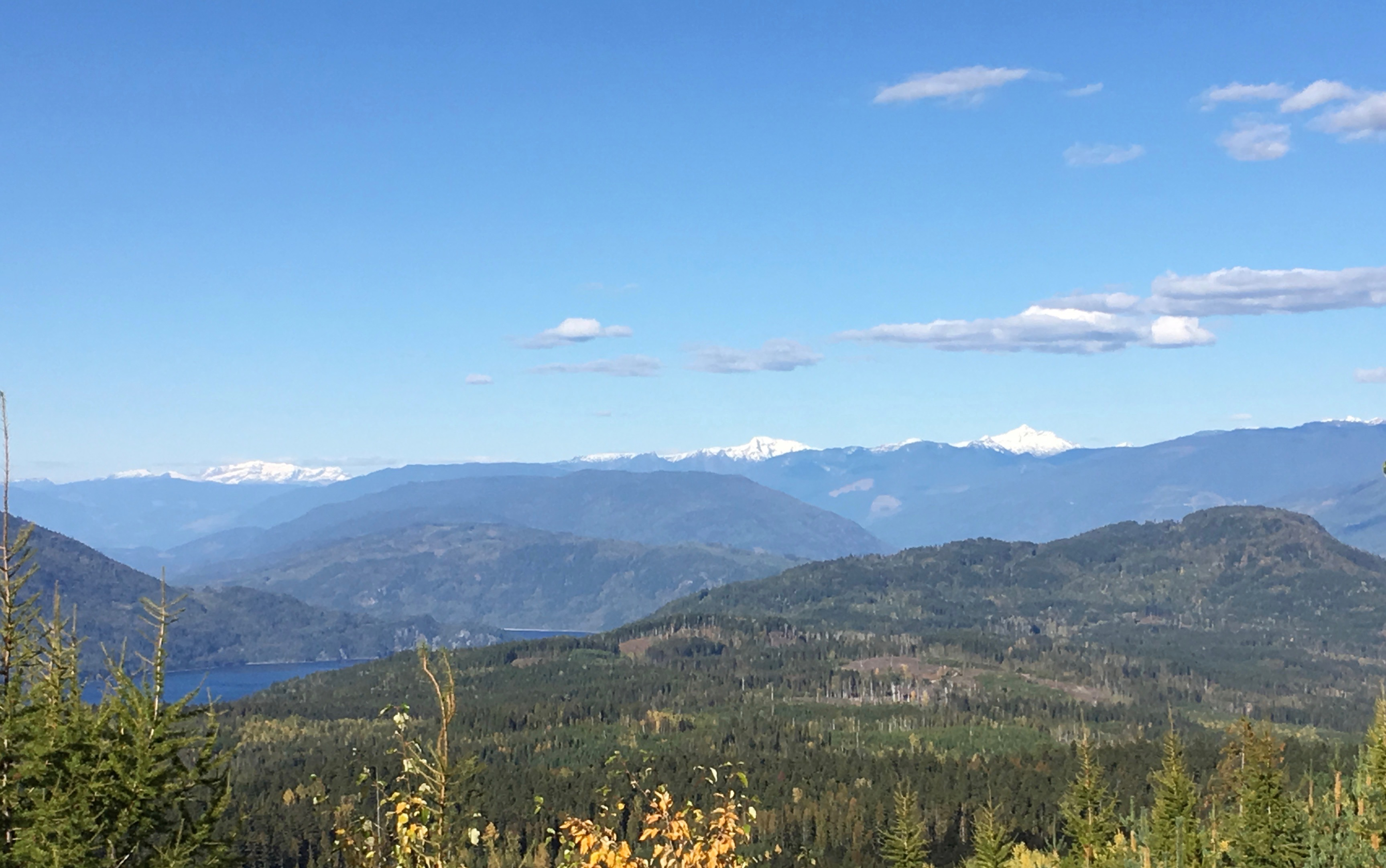
- Anstey Range and Shuswap Lake

Highest point
- Elevation: 1,937 m (6,355 ft)

Geography
- Location within British Columbia
- Country: Canada
- Region: British Columbia
- Range coordinates: 51°15′N 118°48′W
- Parent range: Monashee Mountains

The Anstey Range is a mountain range in southeastern British Columbia, Canada, located east of the Seymour Arm of Shuswap Lake, south of Ratchford Creek and between the Perry River on the east. It has an area of 507 km^{2} and is a subrange of the Monashee Mountains which in turn form part of the Columbia Mountains.

== See also ==
- List of mountain ranges
