= Victor Lake Provincial Park =

Provincial park in British Columbia, Canada

- IUCN category II (national park)
- Location within British Columbia
- Interactive map of Victor Lake Provincial Park
- Location: British Columbia, Canada
- Nearest city: Revelstoke
- Coordinates: 50°57′22″N 118°24′11″W
- Area: 0.14 km^{2} (0.054 sq mi)
- Established: February 14, 1961
- Governing body: BC Parks

Victor Lake Provincial Park is a provincial park in British Columbia, Canada, located southwest of Revelstoke to the north of Three Valley Lake (just west of the summit of Eagle Pass). It has been closed for several decades due to vandalism.
