= Eastpost Spire =

Mountain peak of the Columbia range in British Columbia

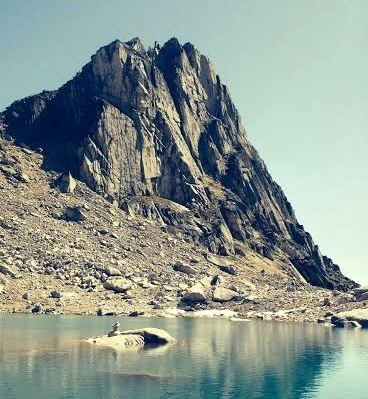
- Eastpost Spire

Highest point
- Elevation: 2,697 m (8,848 ft)
- Coordinates: 50.74667°N 116.7627°W

Geography
- Location within British Columbia
- Location: British Columbia, Canada
- District: Kootenay Land District
- Parent range: Purcell Mountains, Columbia Mountains
- Topo map: NTS 82K10 Howser Creek

Geology
- Rock type: Granite

Eastpost Spire is a peak in the Purcell Mountains of the Columbia Mountains in southeastern British Columbia, Canada. Eastpost Spire lies just to the East of Bugaboo and Snowpatch Spires.

== Gallery ==
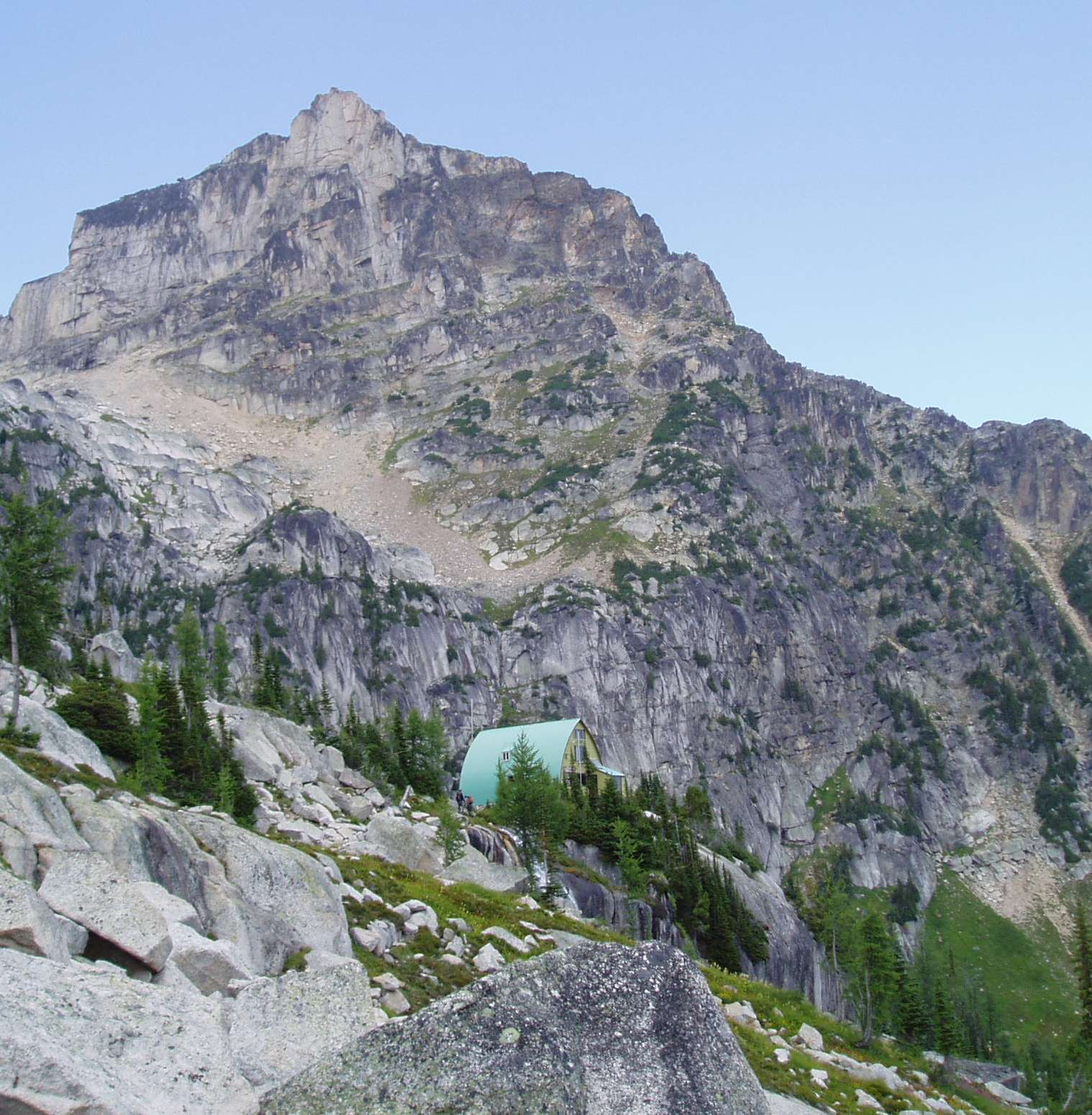
Conrad Kain Hut and Eastpost Spire

== See also ==
- The Bugaboos
