= Big White =

Big White may refer to:

- Big White Mountain, mountain in British Columbia, Canada
- Big White Ski Resort, ski resort in British Columbia, Canada
- Big whites, upper-class colonists in French Saint-Domingue
- Sheheke (1766–1812), Mandan chief also known as Big White

== See also ==
- Big White Fog, play written by Theodore Ward
- Large white, species of butterfly
- Large White pig, British breed of pig
- The Big White, 2005 film
