= Monashee Provincial Park =

Provincial park in British Columbia, Canada

- IUCN category II (national park)
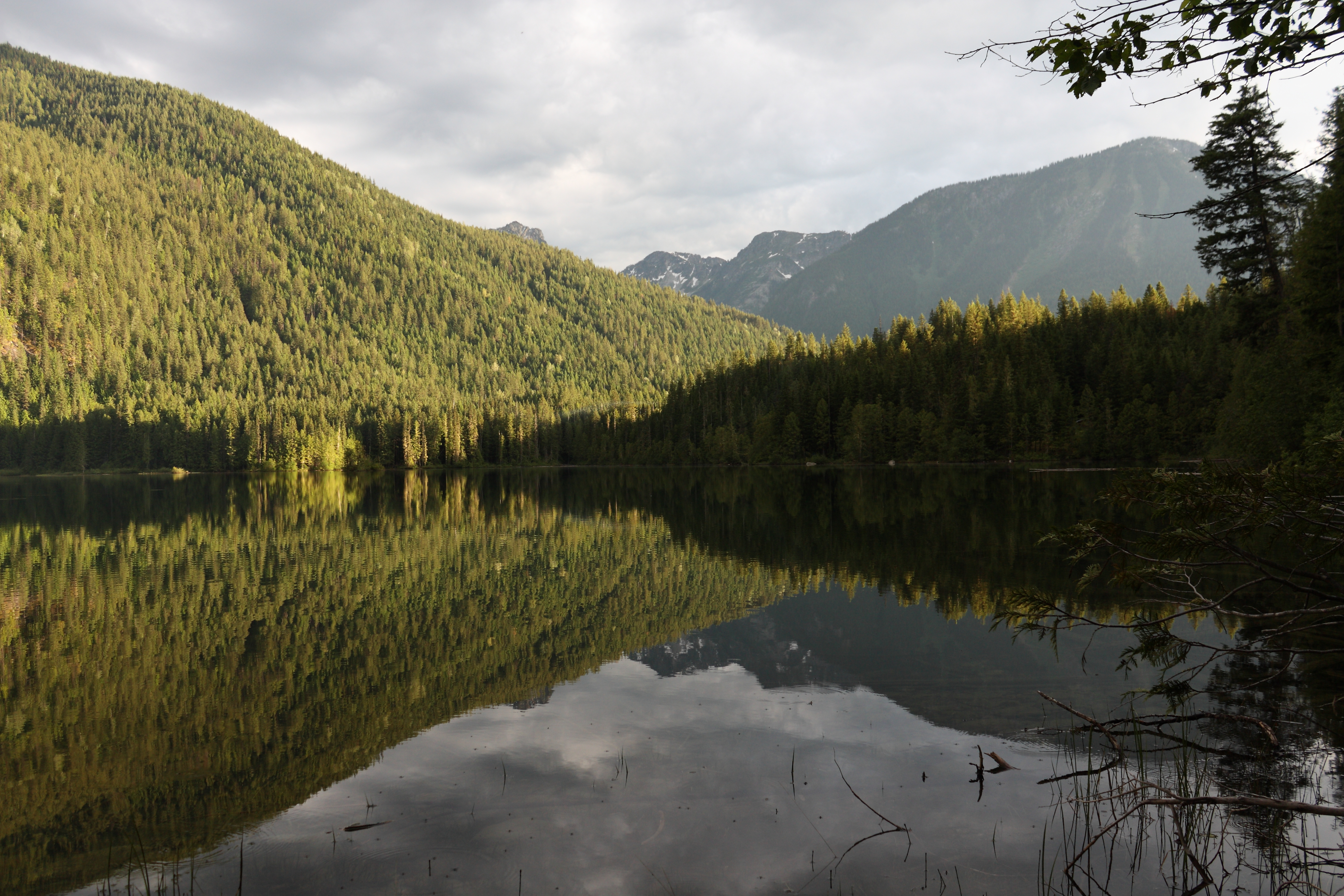
- Panoramic view

- Location within British Columbia
- Interactive map of Monashee Provincial Park
- Location: British Columbia, Canada
- Nearest city: Revelstoke
- Coordinates: 50°32′29″N 118°16′00″W
- Area: 227.39 km^{2} (87.80 sq mi)
- Established: May 1, 1962
- Governing body: BC Parks

Monashee Provincial Park is a provincial park located just outside of Cherryville, British Columbia, Canada. It is located in the central Monashee Mountains between the Arrow Lakes and the upper Shuswap River drainage, just east of Sugar Lake. It is a remote grizzly habitat that is a walk-in only. Mount Fosthall is the highest peak in the area and can be hiked in a day. In addition to hiking and alpinism other activities include fishing.
