= Ratchford Range =

Mountain range in British Columbia, Canada

Coordinates: 51°30′N 118°45′W

- Location within British Columbia

Geography
- Country: Canada
- Province: British Columbia
- Parent range: Monashee Mountains

The Ratchford Range is a subrange of the Monashee Mountains of the Columbia Mountains, located east of the Seymour River in British Columbia, Canada.
