= Christina Range =

Mountain range in British Columbia, Canada

Christina Ridge
- Location within British Columbia

Geography
- Country: Canada
- Region: British Columbia
- Range coordinates: 49°30′N 118°20′W
- Parent range: Monashee Mountains

The Christina Range is a mountain range in southeastern British Columbia, Canada, located roughly north of Grand Forks, between Lower Arrow Lake and the Granby River. It has an area of 2442 km^{2} and is a subrange of the Monashee Mountains, which in turn form part of the Columbia Mountains.

== See also ==
- List of mountain ranges
