= Norns Range =

Mountain range in British Columbia, Canada

- Location within British Columbia

Highest point
- Coordinates: 49°30′N 117°50′W

Geography
- Country: Canada
- Province: British Columbia
- Parent range: Valkyr Range

The Norns Range is a subrange of the Valkyr Range of the Selkirk Mountains in southeastern British Columbia, Canada, located southwest of junction of Little Slocan River and Slocan River north of Castlegar. The Norns were the Fate in Scandinavian mythology.
