= Graystokes Provincial Park =

Provincial park in British Columbia, Canada

- IUCN category II (national park)
- Location within British Columbia
- Interactive map of Graystokes Provincial Park
- Location: Central and North Okanagan, British Columbia
- Nearest city: Kelowna
- Coordinates: 49°59′00″N 118°50′00″W
- Area: 11,958 ha (46.17 sq mi)
- Created: 18 April 2001
- Governing body: BC Parks

Graystokes Provincial Park is a provincial park located on the border between the regional districts of Central Okanagan and North Okanagan in south-central British Columbia. It was established on 18 April 2001 to protect a large area of the ecologically diverse Okanagan Highland east of the Okanagan Valley.

== Description ==
Graystokes Park is set in the Okanagan Highland, a plateau featuring a rich collection of alpine wetlands, meadows, and riparian habitats set within the larger Okanagan dry forests ecoregion. The highland provinces critical mid-to-late summer habitat for local wildlife when the valley floor is no longer productive.

The park is underdeveloped with no dedicated trails or running water. Motorized vehicles are forbidden from entering the park, with the exception of snowmobiles during winter months. Hunting is a popular activity during open season. Despite its backcountry nature, the park is rated as a Category II protected area by the IUCN.

== Ecology ==
Greystokes Provincial Park protects an extensive old growth forest dominated by subalpine fir, Engelmann spruce, and Douglas fir. Large mammals found within the park include grizzly bear, mountain caribou, moose, mule deer, and white-tailed deer.

== See also ==
- Granby Provincial Park
