= Big White Mountain =

Mountain in British Columbia, Canada

- Location within British Columbia
- Interactive map of Big White Mountain

Highest point
- Elevation: 2,315 m (7,595 ft)
- Prominence: 1,110 m (3,640 ft)
- Parent peak: Pinnacle Peak
- Listing: Mountains of British Columbia
- Coordinates: 49°44′40″N 118°56′07″W

Geography
- Country: Canada
- Province: British Columbia
- Parent range: Okanagan Highland
- Topo map: NTS 82E10 Christian Valley

Big White Mountain 2,315 m (7,595 ft) is the highest mountain of the Okanagan Highland, Canada, and also of the Beaverdell Range, a subrange of that formation, which lies between the Okanagan Valley to its west and the main spine of the Monashee Mountains to its east. The mountain lies between the head of the Kettle River and the source of Damfino Creek. The area is intersected by the Big White Mountain Ecological Reserve.

The mountain is commonly called Big White, a reference shared by the Big White Ski Resort built around its summit.

== See also ==
- Monashee Pass (prominence col for Big White Mountain)
