= Maple Mountain (Washington) =

Mountain in Washington (state), United States

- Location within Washington (state)

Highest point
- Elevation: 5,280+ ft (1,610+ m)
- Prominence: 590 ft (180 m)
- Coordinates: 48°43′17″N 118°50′34″W

Geography
- Location: Okanogan County, Washington, U.S.
- Parent range: Okanogan Highlands
- Topo map: USGS Storm King Mountain

Geology
- Rock age: Eocene
- Mountain type: Rhyolite flows

Climbing
- Easiest route: Maple Mountain Trail

Maple Mountain is a mountain located in Okanogan County in the U.S. state of Washington. With an elevation of 5,280+ ft (1,610+ m), its nearest neighbors are Storm King Mountain 2.1 miles (3.4 km) east, and Clackamas Mountain 2.6 miles (4.2 km) to the west. The mountain is mostly treed except for the South side, which has exposed slab, with grasses growing in some areas. This is the most technical route possible, and requires some rock scrambling. The easiest route up the mountain is the Maple Mountain trail which climbs 1420 vertical feet from Granite Creek to just below the summit in only 1.56 miles (2.51 km).
