= Nancy Argenta =

Canadian soprano singer

- Born: Nancy Maureen Herbison; January 17, 1957 (age 69); Nelson, British Columbia
- Occupation: soprano

Nancy Argenta is a Canadian soprano singer, best known for performing and recording music from the pre-classical era. She has won international acclaim, and is considered one of the leading Handel and Bach sopranos of her time.

== Life ==
She was born in Nelson, British Columbia, Canada. She spent her early years in the settlement of Argenta, from which she later took her professional name (to avoid being mistaken for another Canadian soprano, Nancy Hermiston.)

At the age of 11 she started formal voice lessons with Dr. Amy Ferguson of Nelson, and sang with one of the school choirs at L.V. Rogers High School in Nelson. By that time, she was frequently making trips to Vancouver, British Columbia, so she could hear musical events and have additional singing lessons. After graduation from high school in 1975, she was a student of Jacob Hamm in Vancouver and of Martin Chambers at the University of Western Ontario, graduating in 1980. The same year she won 1st prize in the Sophie Carmen Eckhardt-Gramatté Competition. After further training with Jacqueline Richard in Düsseldorf from 1980 to 1981, and with Gérard Souzay, in 1982 she settled in London, England and completed her studies with Vera Rozsa, and Sir Peter Pears. In 1990, she won Canada's Virginia Parker Prize.

== Career ==
Her professional operatic debut was in two roles in Rameau's Hippolyte et Aricie at the 1983 Aix-en-Provence Festival. In 1990 she received the Virginia P. Moore Prize, an annual award from the Canada Council for development of the career of a young Canadian classical musician.

Argenta performs and has made many renowned recordiings with period instrument ensembles. These have included the Academy of Ancient Music and The English Concert, La Petite Bande, and such prominent conductors as Trevor Pinnock, Seiji Ozawa, Christopher Hogwood, John Eliot Gardiner, Roger Norrington and Sigiswald Kuijken. She is particularly noted for her performances of the vocal music of the two leading figures in English music during the Baroque era: George Frideric Handel and Henry Purcell. When she returned to the Aix-en-Provence Festival in 1990, it was to sing in the latter's The Fairy Queen. She has performed most of the major Handel operas and oratorios. She also sings all the large-scale Bach choral/vocal works (Mass in B minor, the Passions, the Christmas Oratorio, and several of the cantatas), making notable recordings of these with John Eliot Gardiner.

In the classical era she is noted for performances of Haydn masses (some of which she has recorded with Pinnock and Richard Hickox), Haydn's Creation, the role of Zerlina in Don Giovanni and Despina in Così fan tutte. However, she sings music of all eras. She has recorded Schubert for the Virgin Classics label, and has sung in performances of music by Mahler and Schoenberg.

She currently lives in Victoria, British Columbia, after having England as her home for much of her career. Argenta teaches at the Victoria Conservatory of Music and regularly performs in Victoria with the Victoria Baroque Players, in the Early Music Society of the Islands series, in her own oratorio workshop concerts and other venues.
