= Whatshan Range =

Mountain range in British Columbia, Canada

- Location within British Columbia

Highest point
- Coordinates: 51°52′N 118°09′W

Geography
- Country: Canada
- Province: British Columbia
- Parent range: Monashee Mountains

The Whatshan Range is a subrange of the Monashee Mountains of the Columbia Mountains in southeastern British Columbia, Canada, located south of South Fosthall Creek.
