= Monashee Pass =

Mountain pass in British Columbia, Canada

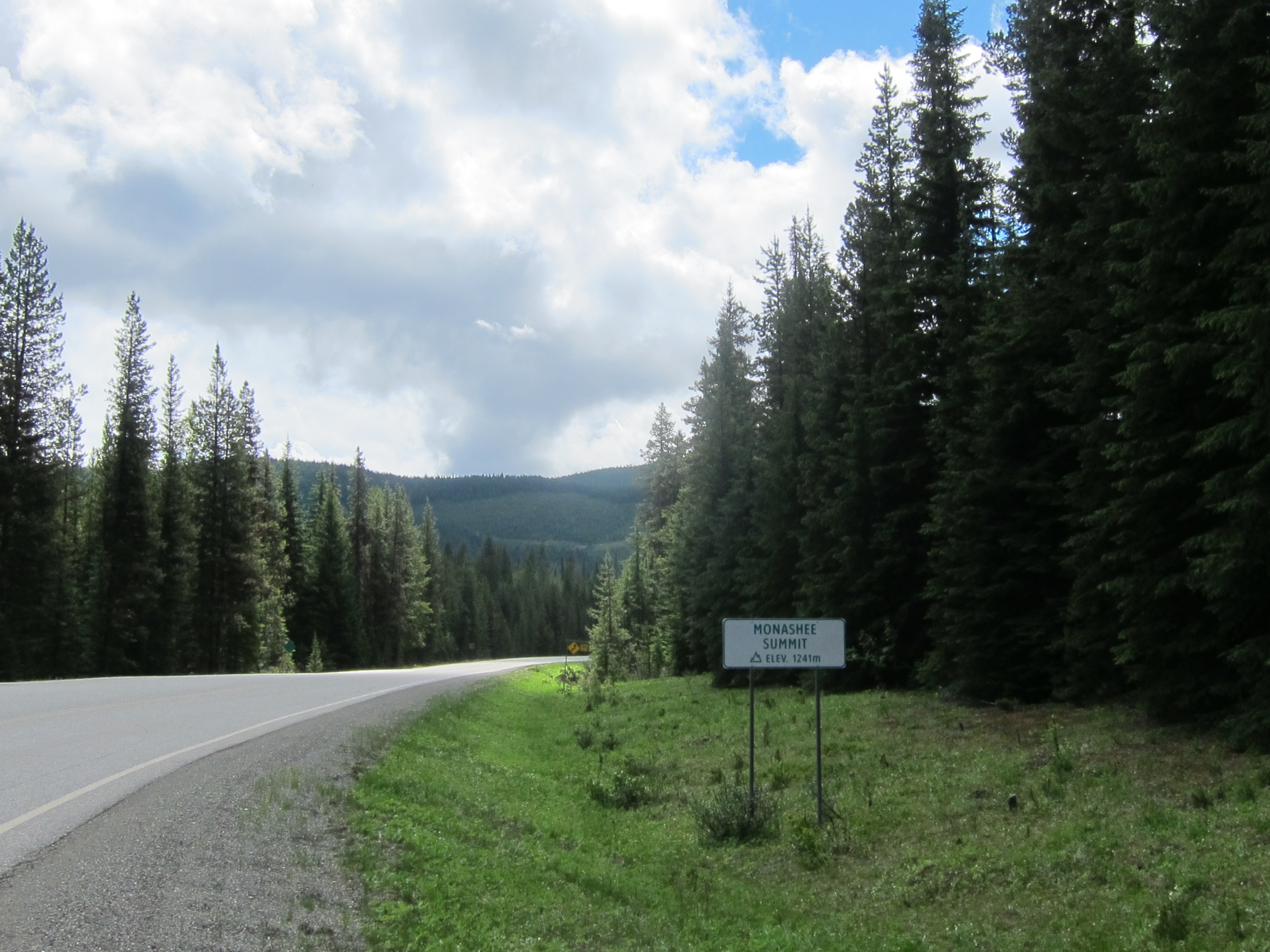

- Location within British Columbia
- Elevation: 1,189 m (3,901 ft)
- Traversed by: Highway 6 (British Columbia Highway 6)

Location
- Location: British Columbia, Canada
- Range: Monashee Mountains
- Coordinates: 50°06′00″N 118°31′00″W
- Topo map: NTS 82L2 Creighton Creek

Monashee Pass, 1,189 m (3,901 ft), is a mountain pass in the Monashee Mountains of the Southern Interior of British Columbia, Canada. Located southeast of Cherryville, the pass is used by British Columbia Highway 6 connecting Vernon to Nakusp on Arrow Lake, and beyond to the cities of the West Kootenay. It is the "prominence col" for Big White Mountain, which is the highest mountain to its southwest.

The word Monashee is from the Gaelic monadh, meaning mountain, and sith, pronounced shee, meaning peace. Monashee therefore means mountain of peace.

Note that Monashee Summit, 1,241 m (4,072 ft) is slightly further southeast on Hwy 6 (near the Lost Lake Rest Area), and is the actual high point on the highway between Vernon & Arrow Lake.
