= Eagle River (Shuswap Lake) =

River in British Columbia, Canada

Coordinates: 50°50′35″N 119°0′39″W

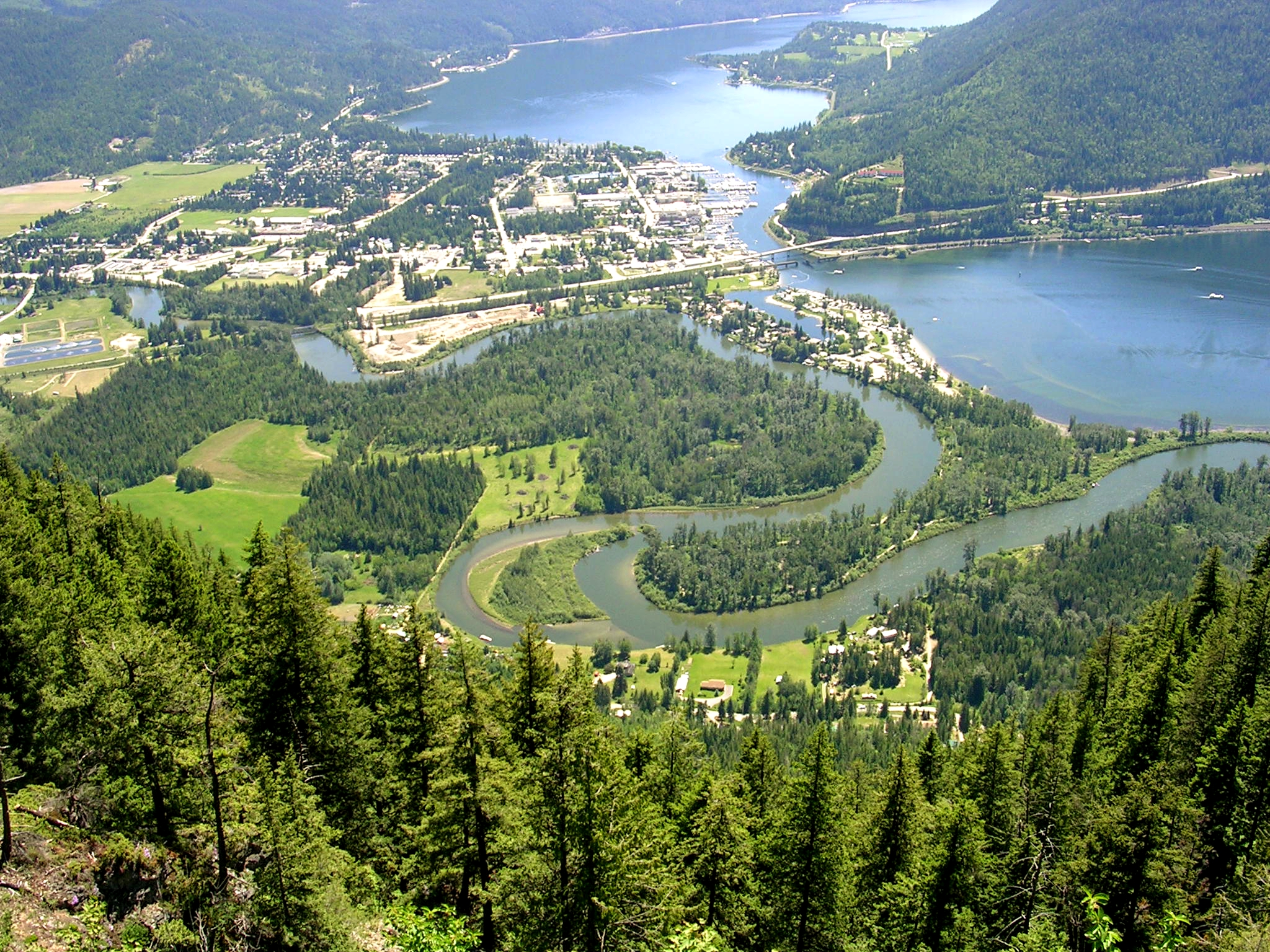
- The mouth of the Eagle River at Sicamous

Physical characteristics
- Mouth: Shuswap Lake
- Length: 80 km (50 mi)
- Basin size: 1,350 km^{2} (520 sq mi)

The Eagle River is a river in the Canadian province of British Columbia. The river is part of the Fraser River drainage basin, via the Thompson River. It was named by explorer Walter Moberly after following the flight of eagles and finding Eagle Pass.

== Course ==
The Eagle River originates near Clanwilliam Lake in the Monashee Mountains, north of the Trans-Canada Highway and west of the city of Revelstoke. It flows west and southwest, going through four lakes, Clanwilliam, Victor, Three Valley, and Griffith. The river ends at its entrance into Shuswap Lake at Sicamous. The Perry River is a major tributary, joining Eagle River near Malakwa. The other major tributary is Crazy Creek, which joins the river east of the Perry River confluence. The river flows for a distance of 75 kilometres (47 mi). Its drainage basin covers 1,350 square kilometres (520 sq mi).

== Protected areas ==
A portion of the river near Malakwa is protected within the 454-hectare (1,120-acre) Eagle River Park.

== See also ==
- List of rivers of British Columbia
