= Okanagan Highlands =

Geographical region in North America

Okanagan Highlands Okanogan Highlands
- Plateau/Highland
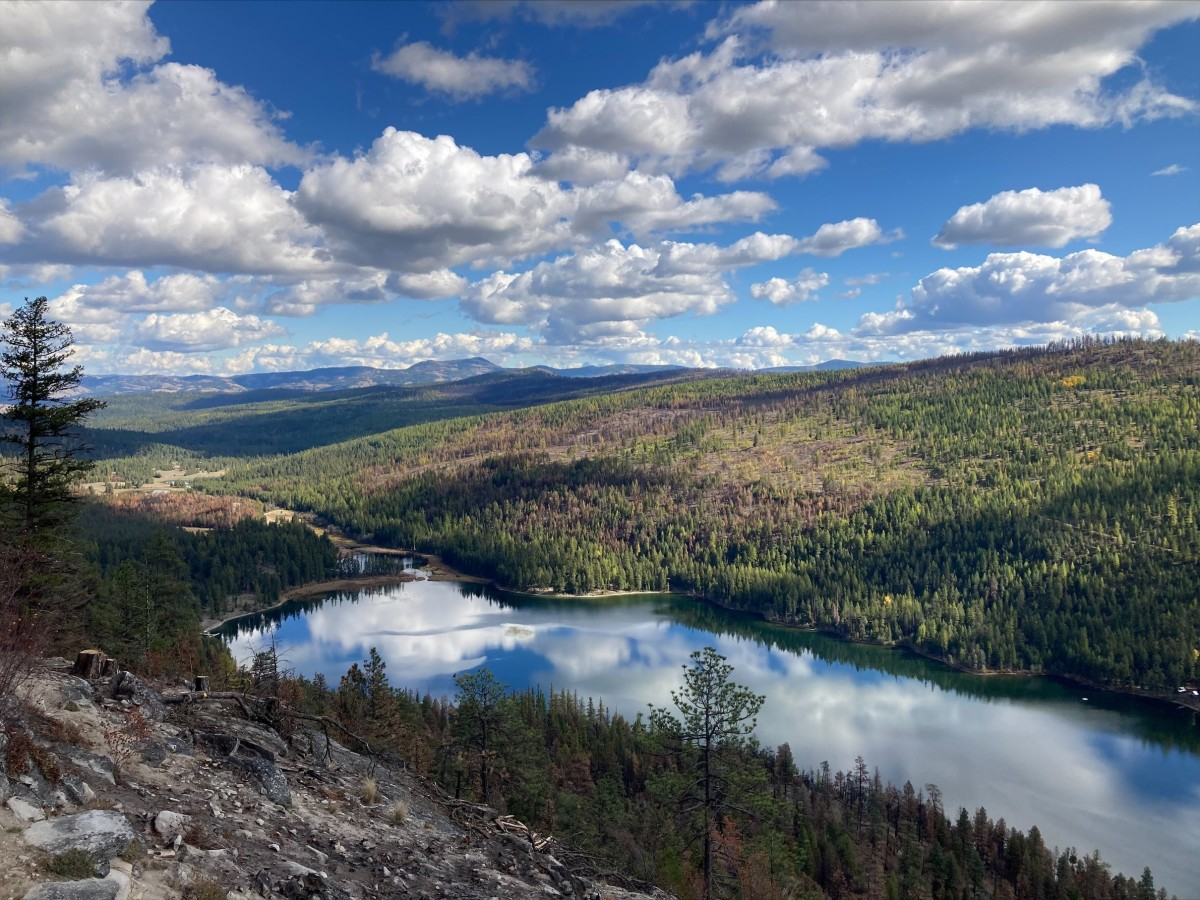
- View north from Mount Bonaparte into the Okanagan highlands core

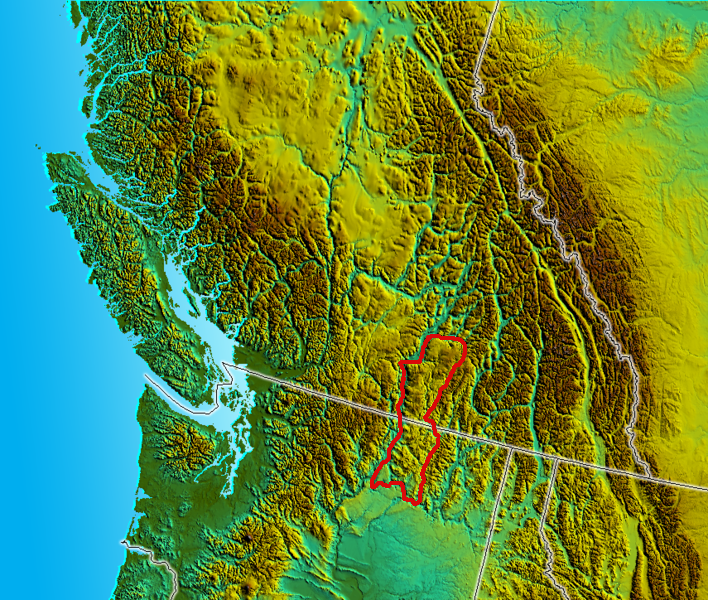
- Location map of the Okanagan Highlands
- Coordinates: 49°35′00″N 119°00′00″W
- Location: British Columbia and Washington
- Part of: Columbia Mountains
- Water bodies: Bonaparte Lake, Kettle River West Kettle River
- Age: Mesozoic
- Formed by: Farallon slab rollback?
- Geology: Quesnellia terraine
- Highest elevation: 7,595 ft (2,315 m) (Big White Mountain)

The Okanagan Highlands are an elevated hilly plateau area in British Columbia, Canada, and the U.S. state of Washington (where it is spelled Okanogan Highlands). Rounded mountains with elevations up to 7,595 ft (2,315 m) above sea level and deep, narrow valleys are characteristic of the region.

== Definition ==
BC Geographical Names, a service of the British Columbia Integrated Land Management Bureau, defines the Okanagan Highlands as an area extending southward from the Shuswap River and the Coldstream Valley, east of Vernon, British Columbia, for 85 miles to the 49th parallel and into the State of Washington, lying between the Monashee Mountains on the east, and the Thompson Plateau and the Okanagan Valley on the west. The eastern boundary of the Okanagan Highlands is clearly defined by the valley of the Kettle River. The western boundary is drawn arbitrarily and is somewhat difficult to define, because there are no natural features to follow between Penticton in the Okanagan Valley and Lumby in the Coldstream Valley.

The Washington State Department of Natural Resources describes the "Okanogan Highlands" as a larger area, extending from east of the Cascade Mountains and north of the Columbia Basin into northern Idaho and the Shuswap Highland in British Columbia. This region includes FDR Reservoir (the impounded Columbia River above Grand Coulee Dam), the Kettle River Range, and the southern portion of the Monashee Mountains.

== Geography ==
The highest summit in the Highlands is Big White Mountain, at its northeastern extremity, which is also the highest summit of the Beaverdell Range, a mountain range which extends south from Big White between the Kettle and West Kettle Rivers. Other notable summits are Little White Mountain, Mount Baldy, Maple Mountain, Mount Moore, Mount Greyback, Mount Hull, Moses Mountain and Mount Bonaparte which is the highest summit in the US portion of the Highlands.

The Okanagan Highlands are the source of several rivers in addition to the Kettle and West Kettle, including the Sanpoil River.

== Conservation ==
Protected areas located within the Okanagan Highlands include Ellison Provincial Park, Kalamalka Lake Provincial Park and Protected Area, Echo Lake Provincial Park, Denison-Bonneau Provincial Park, Wrinkly Face Provincial Park, Graystokes Provincial Park, Okanagan Mountain Provincial Park, Myra-Bellevue Provincial Park, Browne Lake Provincial Park, Skaha Bluffs Provincial Park, Conkle Lake Provincial Park, Johnstone Creek Provincial Park and Colville National Forest.

== Flora ==
One of the most restricted Canadian endemic species, Phemeranthus sediformis, the Okanogan fameflower, is native to the Okanagan Highlands, the Columbia Mountains and Kettle River Range Between Kelowna and the northern Colville Reservation boarder in Washington State.
