= Scrip Range =

Mountain range in British Columbia, Canada

- Location within British Columbia

Highest point
- Coordinates: 51°54′N 118°50′W

Geography
- Country: Canada
- Province: British Columbia
- Parent range: Monashee Mountains

The Scrip Range is a subrange of the Monashee Mountains of the Columbia Mountains, located on the west side of Lake Revelstoke and north of Hoskins Creek in British Columbia, Canada.
