= Vimy Ridge (British Columbia) =

Ridge in British Columbia, Canada

- Location within British Columbia

Highest point
- Coordinates: 52.355°N 119.70°W

Geography
- Country: Canada
- Province: British Columbia
- Parent range: Cariboo Mountains

Vimy Ridge is a mountain ridge in east-central British Columbia, Canada. It has an area of 8 km^{2} and is a subrange of the Cariboo Mountains which in turn form part of the Columbia Mountains.

Vimy Ridge is named to commemorate the Battle of Vimy Ridge in World War I.

== See also ==
- List of mountain ranges
