= Valkyr Range =

Subrange of the Selkirk Mountains, British Columbia, Canada

- Location within British Columbia

Highest point
- Coordinates: 49°50′N 117°56′W

Geography
- Country: Canada
- Province: British Columbia
- Parent range: Selkirk Mountains

The Valkyr Range is a subrange of the Selkirk Mountains of the Columbia Mountains in southeastern British Columbia, Canada, located on the east side of Lower Arrow Lake west of Nelson. "Valkyr" may be a reference to the "Valkyrie" of Norse mythology.
