= Perry River (Eagle River tributary) =

Coordinates: 50°59′42″N 118°41′14″W

The Perry River, sometimes referred to as the North Fork of the Eagle River, is a mountain river in the interior of British Columbia, Canada. It flows out of the Monashee Mountains and joins the Eagle River near the town of Malakwa. It is part of the Thompson River system, which drains into the Fraser River. The river's watershed area is 43,646 hectares (169 sq mi), and major tributaries to the river include Bews and Rocky creeks.

== See also ==
- List of rivers of British Columbia
