= Cherryville, British Columbia =

Unincorporated community in British Columbia, Canada

Coordinates: 50°14′N 118°37′W

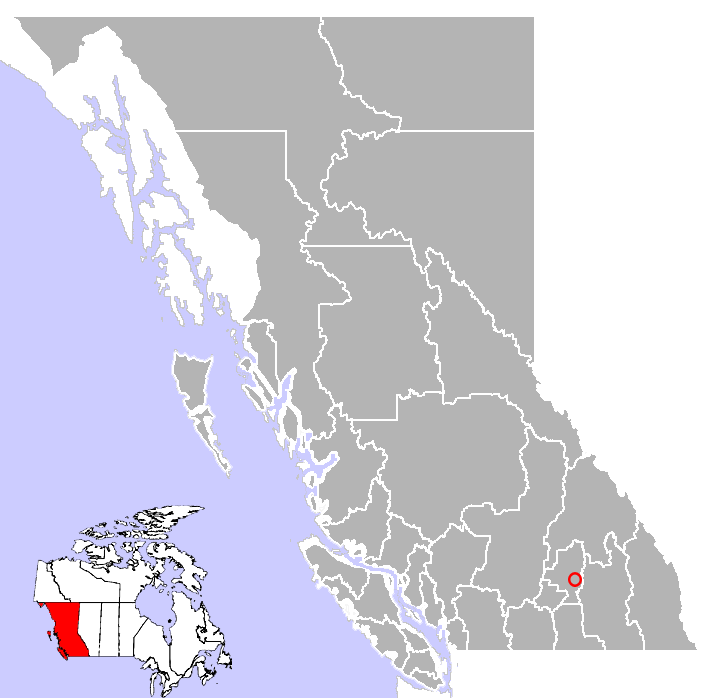
Location of Cherryville, British Columbia

Cherryville is an unincorporated community in the foothills of the Monashee Mountains in British Columbia with a population of approximately 930. It is located 22 kilometres (14 mi) east of Lumby, along Highway 6.

The small community of Cherryville was an old gold mining camp founded in the 1860s by prospectors from the California Gold Rush who had come north to the British Columbia gold rushes. Between 1863 and 1895, the original town that is now known as Cherryville was a small mining camp located within the canyon walls of Cherry Creek. Its population was 100 people, half of which were Chinese miners.

With more and more miners heading into Cherry Creek area, a road was built from Lumby in 1877, through Blue Springs Valley, attracting new families to the area. The community was known by the post office name of Cherry Creek, then Hilton. It was officially named Cherryville in 1919, after the wild Choke Cherries (Prunus virginiana) that grow along the banks of the creek.

Services in Cherryville include accommodation, two general stores, restaurants, a library, a campground, shops and other amenities. Originally an area of orchards, ranching and logging are major industries in the community.

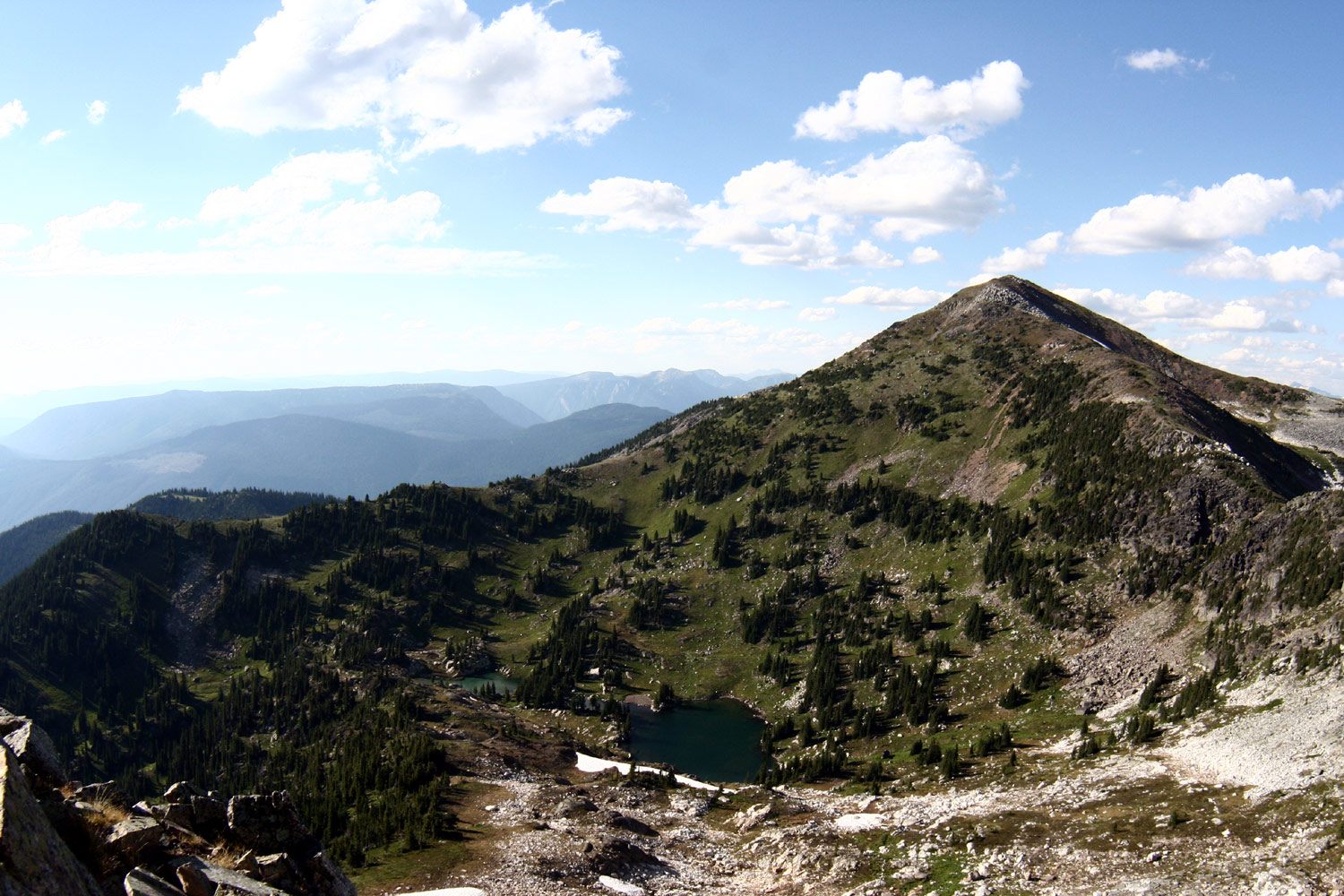
Hiking in the nearby Monashees.

Recreation opportunities in the Cherryville area include bird watching, gold panning, skiing, hiking, camping, horseback tours, and fishing.

== See also ==
- British Columbia gold rushes
