= Silver Hills, Indiana =

Unincorporated community in Indiana, U.S.

Coordinates: 38.28257°N 85.84524°W

Silver Hills is an unincorporated community in Floyd County, Indiana, in the United States.

== Name ==
Silver Hills shares its name with a set of hills. The hills are known locally as "the knobs" and Silver Hills appears to be a translation of the Native American name.
