= Toby Glacier =

Glacier in British Columbia, Canada

Highest point
- Peak: Mount Hamill
- Elevation: 3,274 m (10,741 ft)
- Coordinates: 50°13′18″N 116°36′30″W

Geography
- Country: Canada
- Province: British Columbia
- Parent range: Purcell Mountains

Toby Glacier is a glacier in the Purcell Mountains of southeastern British Columbia, Canada. It covers an area of 123 square kilometres (47 sq mi). Its main drainage basin is Toby Creek. It is located within Purcell Wilderness Conservancy Provincial Park and Protected Area.

== See also ==
- Jumbo Glacier, British Columbia
