= Midway Range =

Mountain range in British Columbia, Canada

- Location within British Columbia

Geography
- Country: Canada
- Province: British Columbia
- Range coordinates: 49°30′N 118°40′W
- Parent range: Monashee Mountains

The Midway Range is a subrange of the Monashee Mountains, located between the Kettle and Granby Rivers in British Columbia, Canada.
