= West Twin Provincial Park and Protected Area =

Provincial park in British Columbia, Canada

- IUCN category II (national park)
- Location within British Columbia
- Interactive map of West Twin Provincial Park and Protected Area
- Location: Fraser-Fort George, British Columbia, Canada
- Nearest town: McBride
- Coordinates: 53°24′22″N 120°33′11″W
- Area: 22,317 ha (86.17 sq mi)
- Established: June 29, 2000
- Governing body: BC Parks

West Twin Provincial Park and Protected Area is a provincial park and protected area located in the Robson Valley of British Columbia, Canada. It was established on June 29, 2000 to protect local wildlife and to preserve the only protected corridor across Robson Valley.

== Facilities ==
The park is largely undeveloped with only walk-in camping and a single alpine hut available for campers.

The West Twin Oldgrowth Area, which is located just east of where Hwy. 16 crosses West Twin Creek, is stand of giant and ancient western red cedars that can be viewed from a short hiking trail that loops through the area.
