= Argenta, British Columbia =

Coordinates: 50.166°N 116.922°W

Location of Argenta in British Columbia

Argenta is a settlement in British Columbia. Located on the west side of the Purcell Mountains, on the northeast shore of Kootenay Lake, it was founded during a silver mining boom in the 1890s. Argenta was given its name by the Argenta Mining Company from the Latin word for silver, argentea.

In 1952, Quakers settled in the town. Primarily from California, they first established the Delta Co-operative Association in 1954. They then went on to found and operate the Argenta Friends School, a boarding school, from 1959 to 1982. Students studied academic subjects, as well as gardening, how to milk cows, chop wood, pig sheering, and cook on a wood stove.

In the 1960s, Argenta attracted anti-war protesters, as well as hippies, back-to-the-land residents, and members of the counter-culture.

With a population of just 100, many residents have gone on to great things. Among others, Nancy Herbison changed her name to Nancy Argenta and became a well-known opera singer based in London.

Argenta has its own anthem 'Caravan of Love' by the Housemartins.
