= West Arm Provincial Park =

Provincial park in British Columbia, Canada

- IUCN category II (national park)
- Location within British Columbia
- Interactive map of West Arm Provincial Park
- Location: British Columbia, Canada
- Nearest city: Nelson
- Coordinates: 49°30′14″N 117°08′00″W
- Area: 261.99 km^{2} (101.15 sq mi)
- Established: July 13, 1995
- Governing body: BC Parks

West Arm Provincial Park is a provincial park in British Columbia, Canada.
