= Three Valley Gap =

- Community
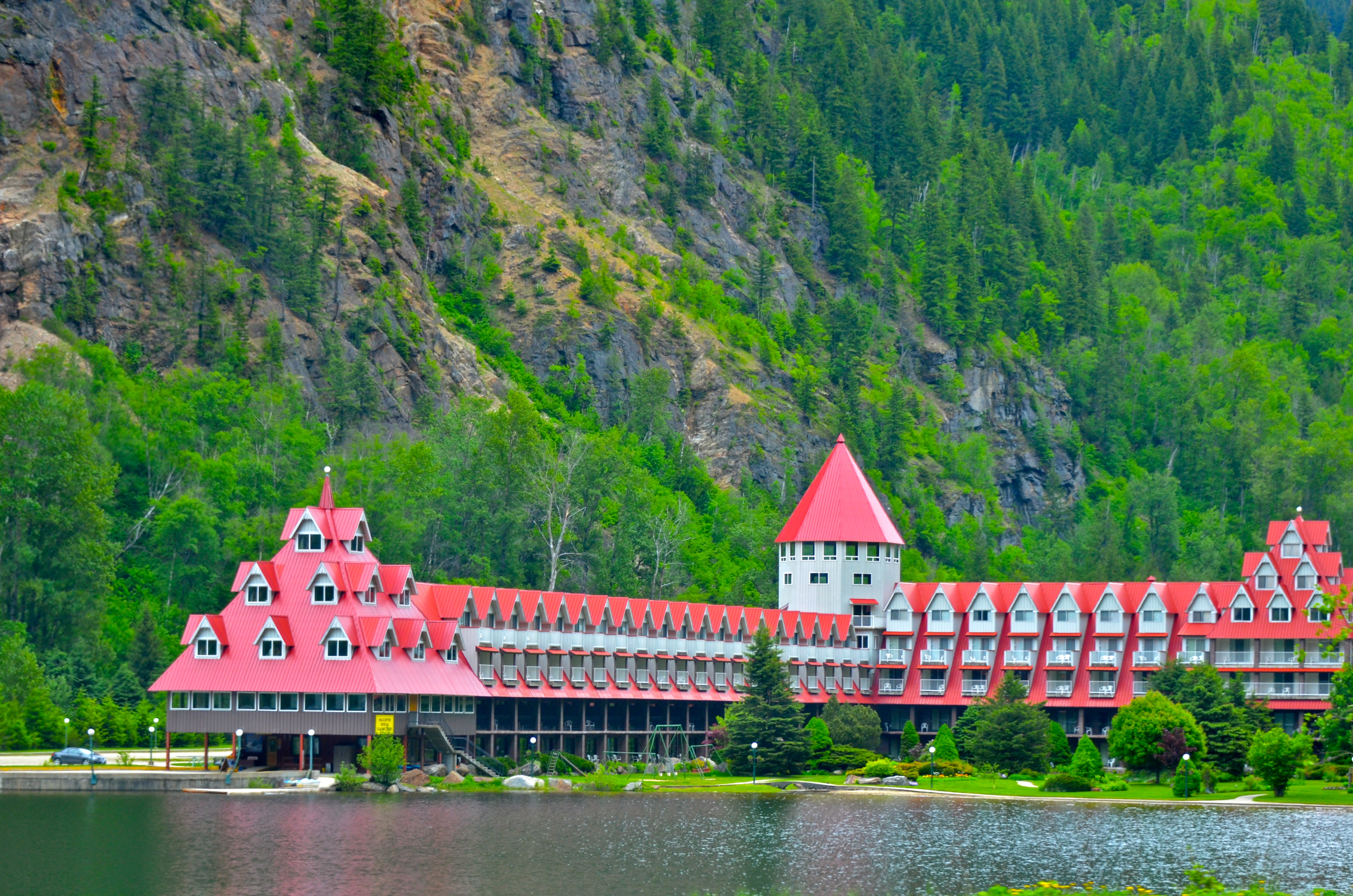
- 3 Valley Lake Chateau

- Location of Three Valley Gap in British Columbia
- Coordinates: 50°56′04″N 118°28′43″W
- Country: Canada
- Province: British Columbia
- Region: Shuswap Country
- Regional district: Columbia-Shuswap
- Time zone: UTC−07:00 (PT)
- Area codes: 250, 778, 236, & 672
- Highways: Highway 1 (TCH)

Three Valley Gap is an unincorporated community at the eastern end of Three Valley Lake in the Shuswap Country region of southeastern British Columbia. On BC Highway 1, the locality is by road about 21 kilometres (13 mi) southwest of Revelstoke, and 51 kilometres (32 mi) northeast of Sicamous.

== Main road and ferries in the area ==
From west to east lie Griffin, Three Valley, Victor, and Clanwilliam lakes along the Eagle River. The valley is narrow and the valley bottom is poorly sorted fluvial and colluvial sands, gravels, and cobbles.

In 1883, the Gustavus Blin Wright syndicate was awarded a contract (in return for a 24,000-hectare (60,000-acre) land grant) to build a 4-metre (12 ft) wide and 69-kilometre (43 mi) long wagon road from Sicamous on Shuswap Lake, via the four lakes, to Big Eddy on the Columbia River. Begun immediately, the work was completed in October 1884. The contract included the provision of ferries on the four lakes, which crossed the gaps along the route.

These free ferries were large scows which could carry the largest freight wagon and horses. The ferry franchise on each lake, which was tendered in 1885, was awarded to Wright. That spring and summer, the Barnard's Express twice weekly stage operated the route.

This road through the area, which the Canadian Pacific Railway (CP) construction destroyed in the mid-1880s, was not restored until 1922. Reconstruction included a 12-metre (40 ft) steel span at Griffin Lake, an 18-metre (60 ft) King truss at Three Valley, and a 30-metre (100 ft) Howe truss at Clanwilliam.

During the Great Depression, three relief camps between Three Valley and Revelstoke upgraded the road.

In 1955, the section along Three Valley Lake was widened, which involved the removal of over 190,000 cubic metres (250,000 yd^{3}) of material over a three-month period. During times of road closure, a tug pushed a four-car capacity former reaction ferry, which carried about 10,000 vehicles over the duration of the project. One explosives blast unexpectedly brought down so much material that the highway was closed for nine days, causing ferry waits of up to 24 hours.

== Specific lakes ==
The lakes in the chain are very deep and cold.

=== Griffin Lake ===
The lake is an expansion of the river.

The surface area is about 65 hectares (160 acres).

By 1902, at the western end of the lake, a big hotel existed opposite the station. A large sawmill shipped out lumber until destroyed along with the crew camp by a huge landslide. The mill was not rebuilt and the station closed.

=== Three Valley Lake ===
Walter Moberly, discoverer of Eagle Pass in 1865, chose the lake name on observing the inflow streams from the three mountain valleys.

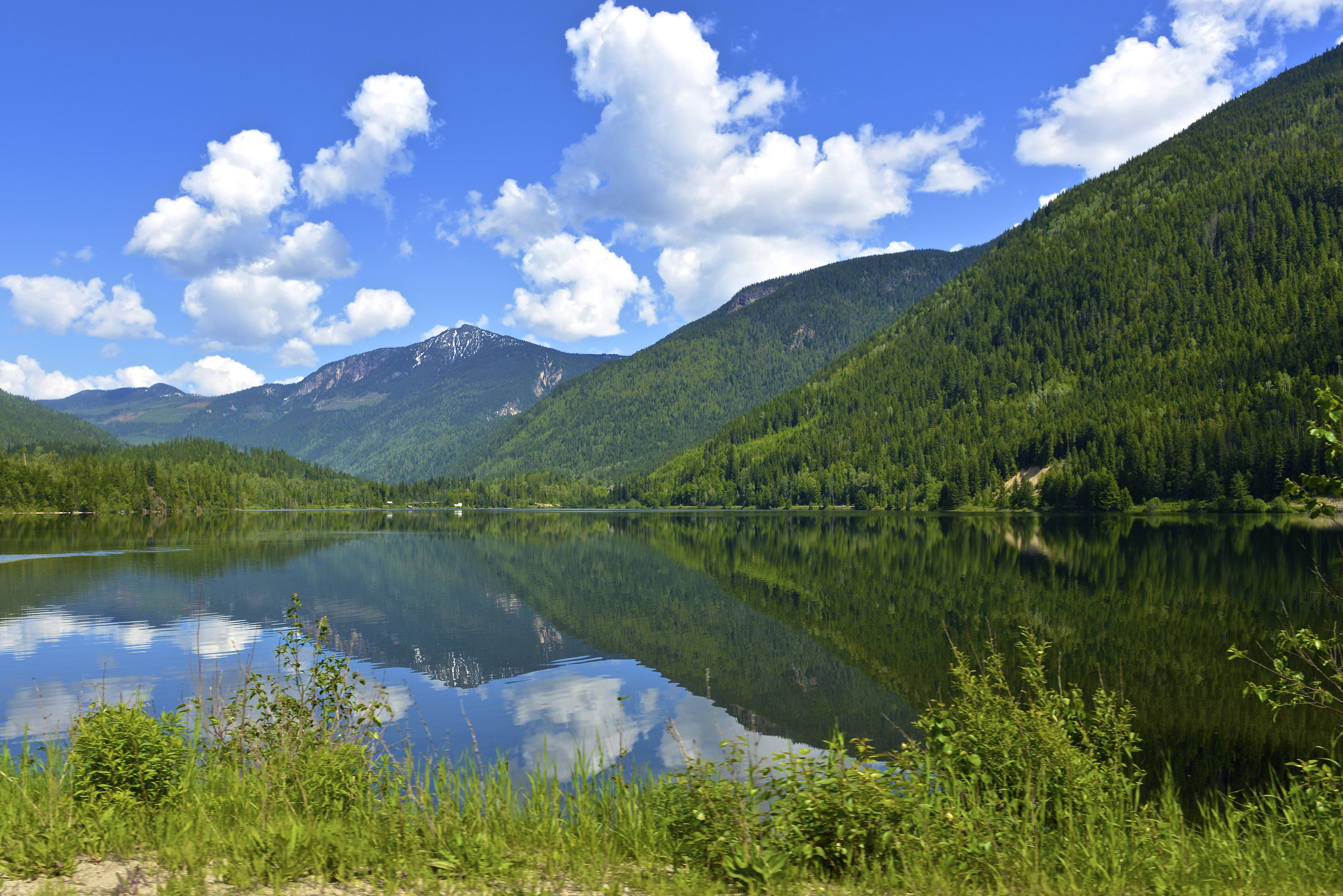
Northwestward view, Three Valley Lake, 2014.

The lake is an expansion of the river.

The surface area is about 150 hectares (370 acres).

Prior to refrigerators, blocks of ice were cut from the lake each winter.

South shore rock scaling and slope stabilization has taken place over the decades.

In 2016, a large metal tower was installed at the cliff top for avalanche control purposes. When triggered by a technician, the device drops explosives charges, sending a wall of snow down the cliff face.

In 2018, a large boulder fell onto the highway.

In 2019, a pilot rockfall fencing system was installed on a section to reduce the chance of rocks landing on the highway.

=== Victor Lake ===
The lake is possibly named after Victor, one of two First Nations guides accompanying Moberly in 1865. The lake is an expansion of the river.

The surface area is about 8.8 hectares (22 acres).

Victor Lake Provincial Park lies at the southwestern end of the lake.

The first rock-climbing route up the steep south-facing cliff above the lake was 2007.

=== Clanwilliam Lake ===
Former names were Bluff Lake, then Summit Lake. The present name honours the Earl of Clanwilliam.

The lake is the head of the river.

The surface area is about 10.7 hectares (26 acres).

In April 1999, about 5,000 to 10,000 cubic metres (6,500 to 13,100 yd^{3}) of material came down in a landslide on the north side east of the lake.

In April 2002, a landslide on the south side swept a highway maintenance worker to his death in the icy lake.

== CP Railway ==
In October 1885, the westward advance of the CP rail head passed through the lakes area.

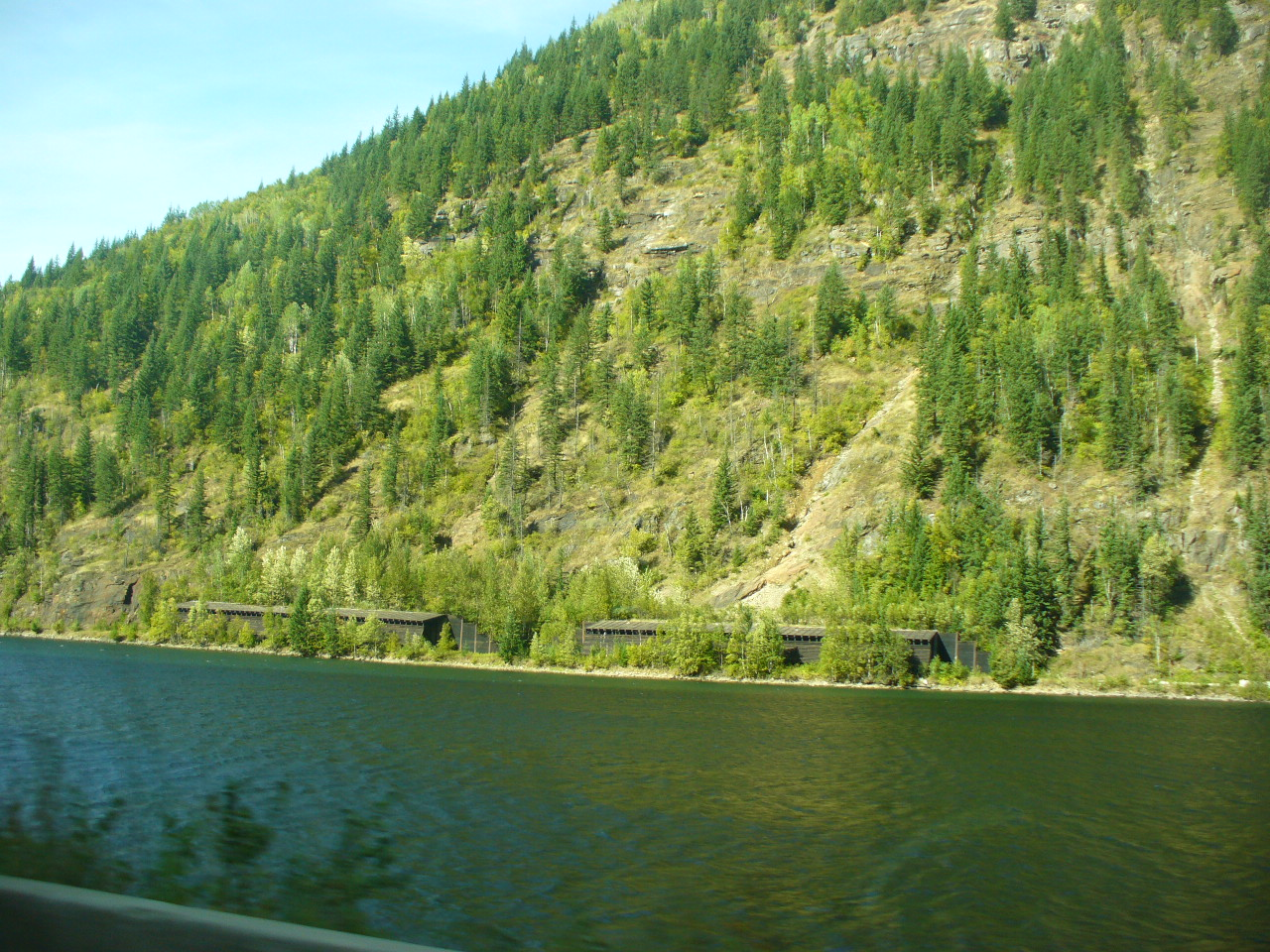
Railway snowsheds, Three Valley Lake, 2011.

During the line construction, snowslides were assumed to occur only along the Revelstoke–Donald leg. The discovery in the 1886–87 winter that these were also occurring in the lakes stretch came as a surprise, prompting a recommendation that the building of snowsheds there should be given priority.

In 1906, the Three Valley stop opened, a new station building was erected, and the Griffin Lake stop closed. That year, a landslide falling upon a freight train derailed the locomotive and several cars.

The station was on the north side of the track at the west end of the lake, about 150 metres (160 yd) east of where Three Valley Siding Road meets the railway line. The section house was across the track about 50 metres (55 yd) farther along. A Japanese bunkhouse existed in the middle of the present highway about 160 metres (175 yd) south of the present overpass, which suggests the section crew were predominantly Japanese. A water tower was erected east of the station.

Moving trains dropped the incoming mail sack beside the track and collected the outgoing mail from the catcher pouch, which was hooked onto the mail catcher post.

In 1909, a snowslide derailed a freight train, sending both locomotive crew members to their deaths in Three Valley Lake. That spring, a landslide destroyed several stretches of track about 1.6 kilometres (1 mi) west of the station, and high water washed out the wooden rail bridge over the river.

In 1910, a 91-metre (300 ft) long and 6-metre (20 ft) deep slide occurred, a steel rail bridge was built over the river, and an open switch to the Mundy Lumber siding derailed the locomotive and three cars of a passing westbound passenger train.

In 1911, a westbound freight train struck a man walking along the track, cracking three of his ribs, a freighthopper was crushed to death when the load of lumber upon which he was riding shifted, and a boulder fell near the track.

In 1912, a speeding westbound locomotive collided head on with an eastbound passenger train midway along Three Valley Lake, killing the latter fireman.

In 1914, the Taft–Three Valley double-tracking project was completed.

In 1936, the Three Valley section house stood in for the original Port Moody station during the filming of the movie Silent Barriers (1937). On striking a slide that year, the locomotive and nine cars of a freight train derailed. On plunging 30 metres (100 ft) down an embankment, the locomotive came to a stop on piercing the ice of Griffin Lake.

In 1947, a wedding ceremony was performed on the train at the Three Valley station during a three-minute stop.

In 1968, a falling boulder crashed through the side of a passenger train car at Victor Lake killing a 19-year-old woman and injuring six passengers. Six other cars derailed and 240 metres (800 ft) of track was torn up.

At the Three Valley railway point, no infrastructure remains.

The passing track is 2.4 kilometres (7,969 ft) at Three Valley and 2.2 kilometres (7,351 ft) at Clanwilliam.

CP Train Timetables (Regular stop or Flag stop)
	Mile	1887	1891	1898	1905	1909	1912	1916	1919	1929	1932	1935	1939	1943	1948	1954	1959	1960
Malakwa	32.6				Flag	Flag	Flag	Flag	Flag	Flag	Flag	Flag	Flag	Flag	Flag	Flag	Flag	
Craigellachie	28.3	Regular	Flag	Flag	Flag	Flag	Flag	Flag	Flag	Flag	Flag	Flag	Flag	Flag	Flag	Flag		
Taft	24.2					Flag	Both	Flag	Flag	Flag	Flag	Flag	Flag	Flag	Both	Both	Flag	Flag
Griffin Lake	17.3	Regular	Regular	Regular	Flag													
Three Valley	14.6					Regular	Both	Flag	Flag	Flag	Flag	Flag	Flag	Flag	Flag	Flag	Flag	
Eagle Pass	8.5	Regular																
Clanwilliam	8.5		Flag	Regular	Flag	Flag	Flag											
Revelstoke	0.0	Regular	Regular	Regular	Regular	Regular	Regular	Regular	Regular	Regular	Regular	Regular	Regular	Regular	Regular	Regular	Regular	Regular

== Forestry ==
William Mundy built a large sawmill about 500 metres (550 yd) south of the present highway overpass on the shore at the western end of Three Valley Lake. His Mundy Lumber Co. opened a general store in March 1905, and production started at the mill that August. On the completion of wiring in October, the mill electrical generator also supplied the townsite.

Although a section of logging railway existed by 1906, an extension southward to Frog Lake (Wap Lake) did not begin until 1907–08. About 1907, the spur was installed from the CP line to the mill. That year, New York capitalists bought the mill and timber limits for over $1 million.

The sawmill and planning mill, destroyed by fire in 1909, were rebuilt months later with an 18,000-metre (60,000 ft) daily capacity.

In 1910, the recently formed Dominion Sawmills & Lumber Co purchased the Mundy Lumber mill at Three Valley and the Hood Mill at Taft. The next year, Dominion moved its head office from Three Valley to Revelstoke. The Three Valley logging railway remained operational at least until 1912.

In 1913, Forest Mills took over the mill after the liquidation of Dominion Sawmills & Lumber. The following year, a fire destroyed 1,100,000 metres (3,500,000 ft) of finished lumber in the yard. In 1916, the mill closed.

Apart from scattered debris, all that remains of the structure are several large cement footing blocks.

== Three Valley earlier community ==
The initial settlement was at the western end of the lake. On the island, Chinese, who may have been involved in the 1880s CP construction, grew vegetables.

The post office operated 1905–1950. The "Bell Hotel" was erected in 1907. The mill offices occupied the main floor, and the employee bedrooms were upstairs. Mill employees with families resided along Three Valley Siding Road, which curved up the hill. At the top, the school was established in 1908 in a converted mill house.

During the early 1900s, Robert Dahalberg homesteaded near the mouth of South Pass Creek (between the present Rutherford Beach rest area and the pullout). The abandoned South Pass Resort (1960s) occupies the homestead site.

During the early 1910s, "China Gardens" existed about 600 metres (660 yd) northwest of the rest area on the opposite side and about 150 metres (160 yd) west of the highway. The two Chinese occupants grew vegetables on 4 to 6 hectares (10 to 15 acres), which were sold to mill employees.

When fire destroyed the schoolhouse, new premises were readied in 1915. This former mill house near the CP tracks, which lacked indoor plumbing, became the one-room schoolhouse/two-room teacherage.

When the mill closed, most of the houses were demolished. John (Jack) Rutherford bought the hotel building. Jack was the locomotive engineer when the governor general opened and traversed the Connaught Tunnel in 1916, and when King George VI and Queen Elizabeth rode in the lead locomotive cab of the westbound royal train from Beavermouth to Stoney Creek in 1939.

His brother Archie Rutherford, who had worked at the mill, bought a large former mill house and a homestead on 16 hectares (40 acres) (which included "China Gardens"). By the mid-1920s, Archie ran the gas station and post office at this location. The boarded up hotel building was demolished in the 1930s.

In 1932, the school closure marked the effective abandonment of the settlement.

By 1958, the infrastructure comprised the CP section house, a few dwellings, and a small auto court.

By 1985, the only dwelling at the former mill townsite was not an original building.

== Japanese internment during World War II ==
World War II Japanese Canadian internment camps operated April 1942 to July 1944 at Griffin and Three Valley lakes. The men carried out road-widening activities. The latter camp was on the eastern end of the Archie Rutherford homestead site.

In 2018, a memorial sign was unveiled at the rest area.

== Chateau and ghost town museum ==
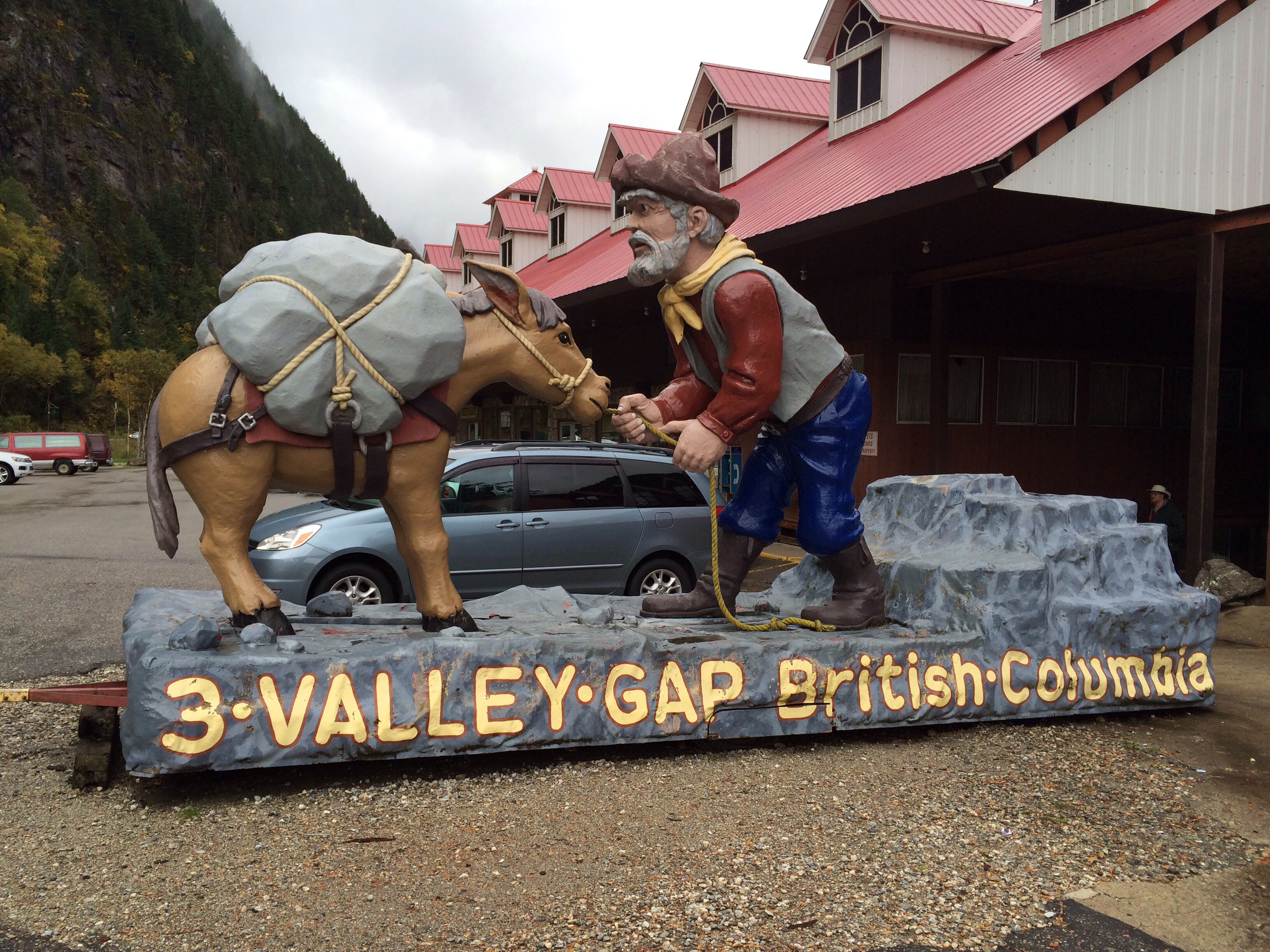
Entrance sculpture, Three Valley Gap, 2013.

In 1956, Gordon and Ethel Bell purchased the site and dumped more than 25,000 tonnes (28,000 short tons) of rock onto the swampland at the eastern end of Three Valley Lake. After building a seven-seat coffee shop, seven-room motel, and museum, the facilities opened in 1960 but did not break even until 1974.

The 200-room chateau, which was built in 1961 and renovated in 2011, is open from Easter to Thanksgiving (Canada).

The ghost town opened in 1962. Half the structures are historic buildings relocated from other places. Also on the site are an antique auto museum and a railway roundhouse containing some historic items. The attraction is open year round.

== Maps ==
- "Shuswap sheet map". geography.ua.edu. 1898.
- Three Valley to Clanwilliam lakes map. 1986.
- Three Valley Lake (west end) map. 1986.
- Rutherford homestead map. 1910s to 1940s.
