= Beaverdell Range =

Mountain range in British Columbia, Canada

- Location within British Columbia

Dimensions
- Area: 1,611 km^{2} (622 mi^{2})

Geography
- Country: Canada
- Province: British Columbia
- Range coordinates: 49°35′N 118°57′W
- Parent range: Okanagan Highland
- Topo maps: NTS 82E10 Christian Valley; NTS 82E11 Wilkinson Creek; NTS 82E2 Greenwood; NTS 82E3 Osoyoos; NTS 82E6 Beaverdell; NTS 82E7 Almond Mountain

The Beaverdell Range is a subrange of the Okanagan Highland in the Southern Interior of British Columbia, located between the West Kettle and Kettle Rivers, and running nearly due south from Big White Mountain, which is its highest summit, and the highest in the Okanagan Highland, and lies near the head of the Kettle.

The Beaverdell Range gets its name from the community of Beaverdell, which lies on its southwest flank midway along the West Kettle River, which was also the route of the Kettle Valley Railway, now a biking and hiking trail that is part of the Trans-Canada Trail.

The range is of considerable mineralogical interest as it is known to contain large deposits of uranium, for which British Columbia has had for many years a mining moratorium. Residents of the area oppose uranium mining, although the history of the region is connected with various small gold rushes.
