= Granby Provincial Park =

Provincial park in British Columbia, Canada

- IUCN category II (national park)
- Location within British Columbia
- Interactive map of Granby Provincial Park
- Location: Similkameen Division Yale Land District, British Columbia, Canada
- Nearest city: Kelowna, BC
- Coordinates: 49°44′29″N 118°27′45″W
- Area: 41,156 ha (101,700 acres)
- Established: July 13, 1995
- Governing body: BC Parks

Granby Provincial Park is a provincial park in British Columbia, Canada. It is located north of Grand Forks and contains the northern portion of the Granby River. The park is 411.56 km^{2} in size.

Granby Park is one of the least-known and least-explored wilderness areas in southern British Columbia. This undeveloped park encompasses the headwaters of the Granby River and several adjacent basins, and is one of the last major watersheds in the Boundary region to be protected from logging.

== Facilities ==
This 40,845-hectare park is very new, having just opened up to the public in 1995. The park is new enough that it lacks adequate signage and formal facilities. There are no facilities in the park, not even an outhouse. All camping in the park is wilderness camping, and visitors are expected to practice 'no trace' camping. Visitors need to be self-contained and prepared to wait for help in case of emergency.
