= St. Mary's Alpine Provincial Park =

Canadian provincial park

- IUCN category II (national park)
- Location within British Columbia
- Interactive map of St. Mary's Alpine Provincial Park
- Location: British Columbia, Canada
- Nearest city: Kimberley
- Coordinates: 49°52′49″N 116°20′59″W
- Area: 91.46 km^{2} (35.31 sq mi)
- Established: May 18, 1973
- Governing body: BC Parks
- Website: bcparks.ca/st-marys-alpine-park/

St. Mary's Alpine Provincial Park is a provincial park in British Columbia, Canada. According to the Canadian Ministry of the Environment:

St. Mary’s Alpine Park is a wilderness paradise for the experienced backcountry traveller. Numerous lakes and tarns are tucked against rugged granite cliffs and surrounded by tundra and lingering snowfields. Seven creeks drain the lakes, resulting in numerous waterfalls and cataracts, some as much as 150 metres in height. Experienced hikers, willing to expend considerable effort in bushwhacking and route finding should visit this protected area where few, if any, people will be encountered.
