= Monashee Mountains =

Mountain range in the country of Canada

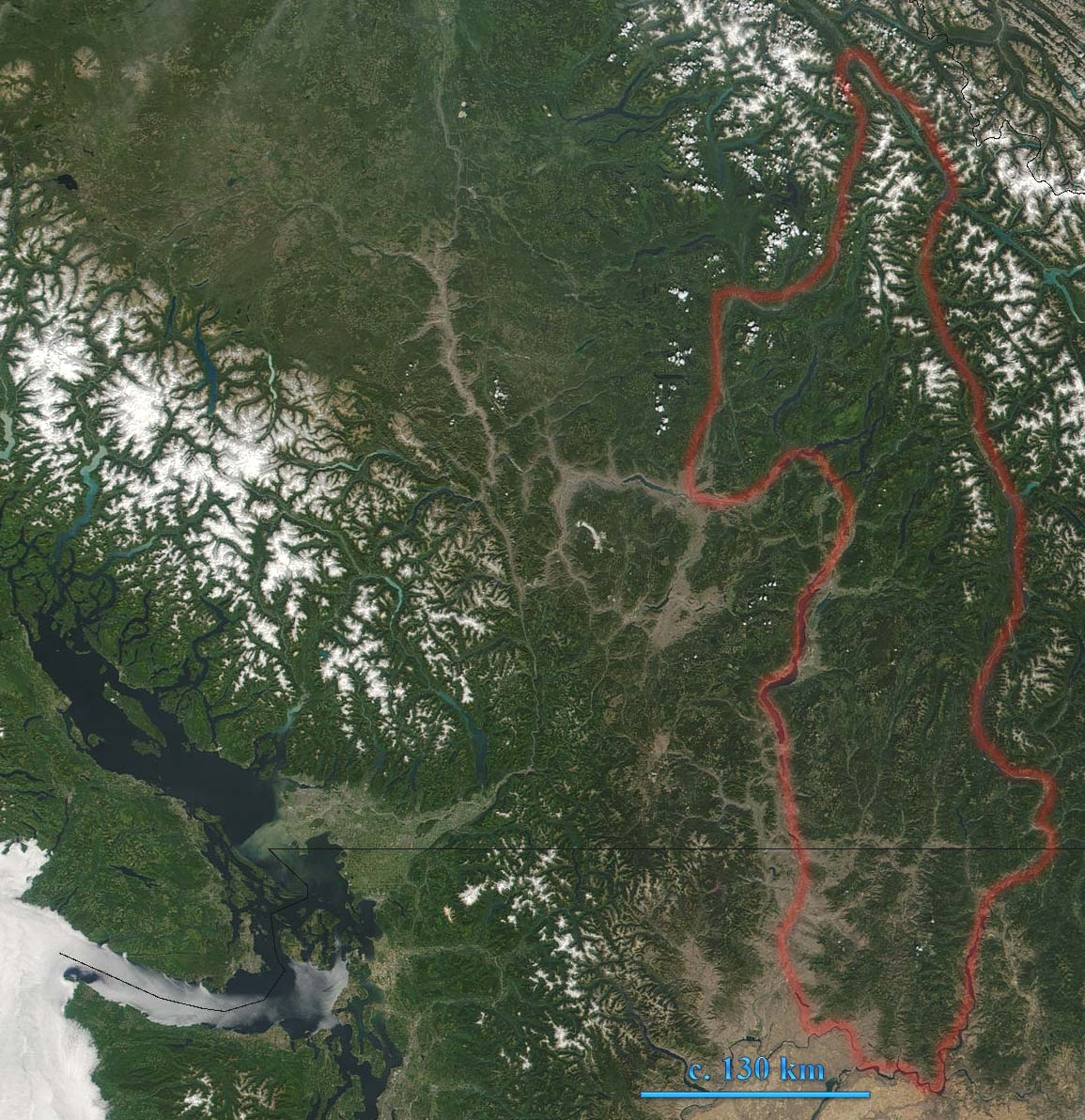
- Monashee Mountains are indicated. In the left of the image lies Vancouver Island. The boundary here includes the Okanagan Highland and portions of the Shuswap Highland.

Highest point
- Peak: Mount Monashee
- Elevation: 3,274 m (10,741 ft)
- Coordinates: 52°23′07″N 118°56′24″W

Dimensions
- Length: 530 km (330 mi) N-S
- Width: 150 km (93 mi) W-E

Geography
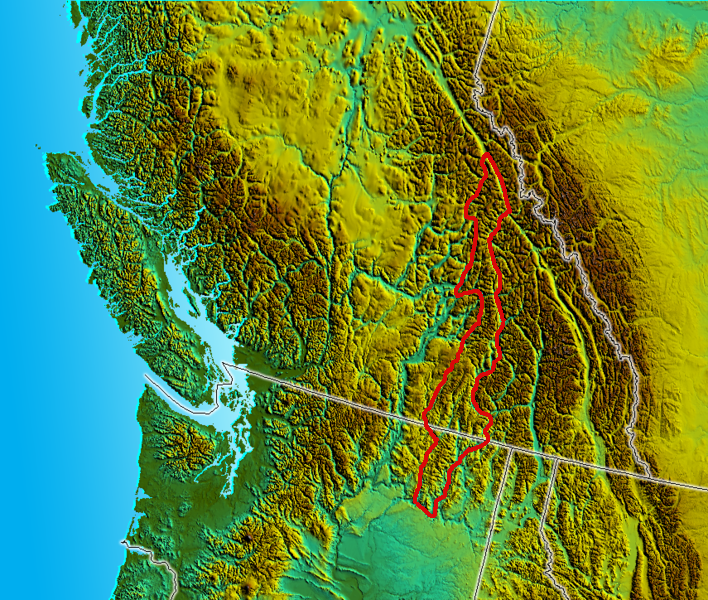
- Countries: Canada; United States
- Provinces/States: British Columbia; Washington
- Parent range: Columbia Mountains

The Monashee Mountains are a mountain range lying mostly in British Columbia, Canada, extending into the U.S. state of Washington. They stretch 530 km (329 mi) from north to south and 150 km (93 mi) from east to west. They are a sub-range of the Columbia Mountains. The highest summit is Mount Monashee, which reaches 3,274 m (10,741 ft). The name is from the Scottish Gaelic monadh and sìth, meaning "moor" and "peace".

== Geography ==
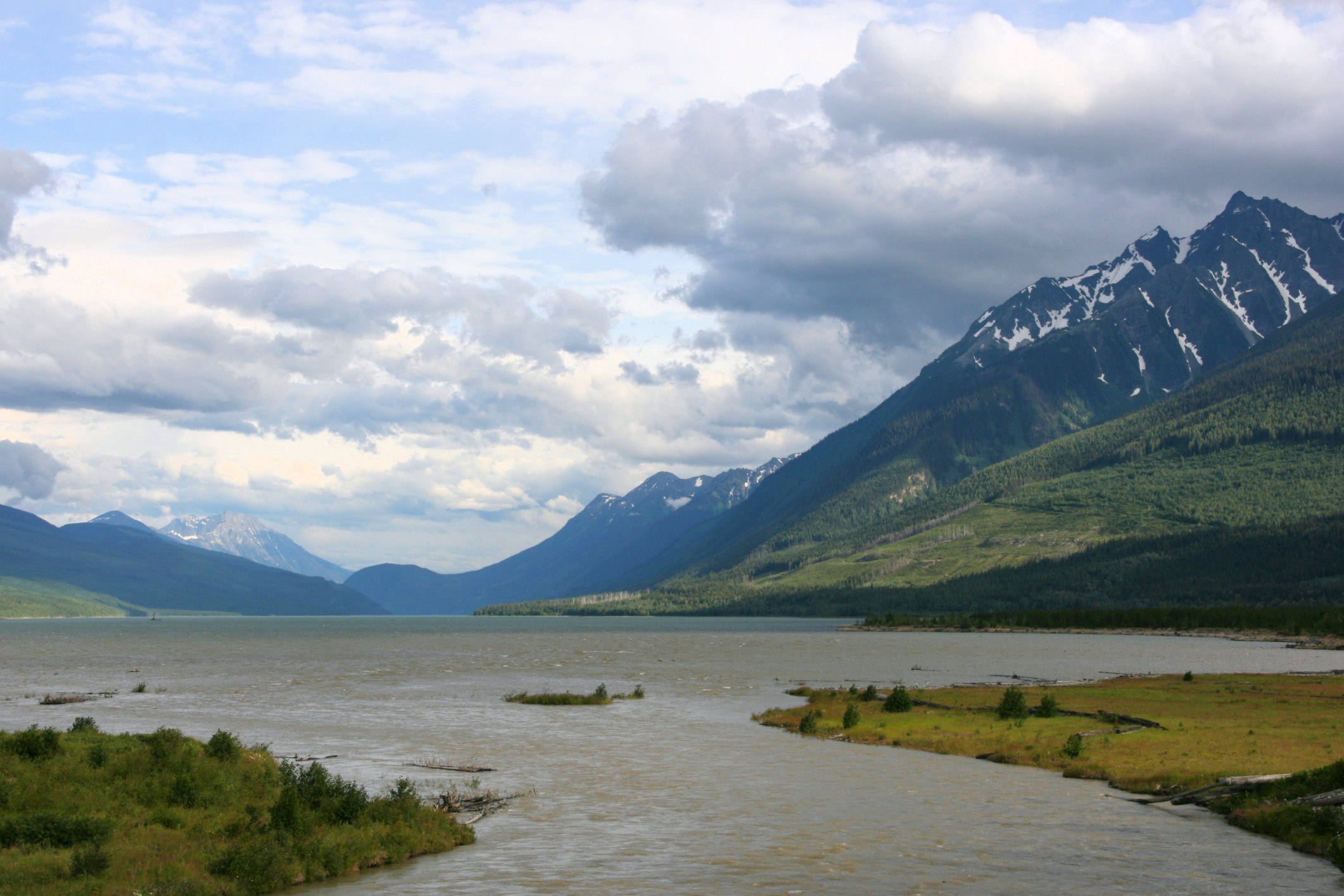
Looking southeast over Kinbasket Lake, Monashee Mountains on the right, Rocky Mountains on the left.

The Monashee Mountains are limited on the east by the Columbia River and Arrow Lakes, beyond which lie the Selkirk Mountains. They are limited on the west by the upper North Thompson River and the Interior Plateau. The northern end of the range is Canoe Mountain at the south end of the Robson Valley, near of the town of Valemount, British Columbia. The southern extremity of the range is in Washington State, where the Kettle River Range reaches the confluence of the Kettle River and the Columbia, and reaches west to the southern extremity of the Okanagan Highland (spelled Okanogan Highland in the US) just northeast of the confluence of the Okanogan and Columbia rivers at Brewster and Bridgeport, Washington.

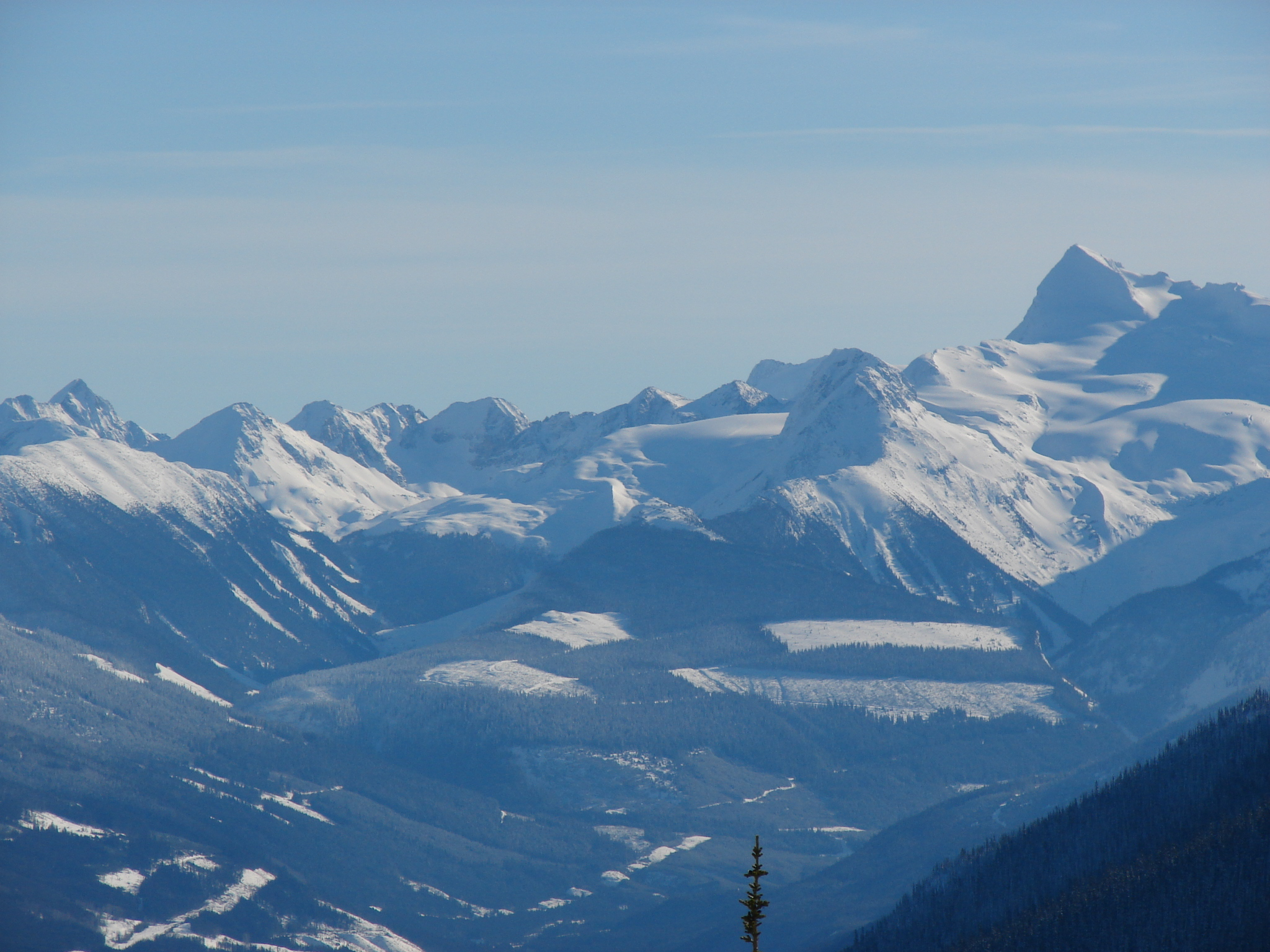
Mt. Albreda and Clemina Creek, Monashee Range

The Okanagan Highland and parts of the Shuswap Highland to the west of the main range are technically classified as part of the Monashees, however, they may also be considered part of the Interior Plateau. The Okanagan Highland lies between the Kettle River and Okanagan Lake, south of the Shuswap River. Within this area, the small Sawtooth Range lies between the uppermost Shuswap River to the east and Mabel Lake to the west. The portion of the Shuswap Highland south of the North Thompson River to the Okanagan Highland, may also be included. Major peaks include Hallam Peak (3,205 m (10,515 ft)) and Cranberry Mountain (2,872 m (9,423 ft)).

== Passes ==
Between Revelstoke and Shuswap Lake, the range is crossed by Highway 1 - the Trans-Canada Highway - and by the mainline of the Canadian Pacific Railway, which run through Eagle Pass. Highway 6 goes over Monashee Pass. The Crowsnest Highway to the south takes the Bonanza Pass. The southern end of the Monashees within Canada is an historically important mining and former industrial area known as the Boundary Country, which is focused around the basin of the lower Kettle River and extends north toward the Midway Range. The Sherman Pass Scenic Byway runs 40 miles (64 km) east from the town of Republic, Washington across the center of the Kettle River Range and reaches its highest point at Sherman Pass, 5,575 feet (1,699 m), the highest mountain pass open all year in Washington state.

== Subranges ==
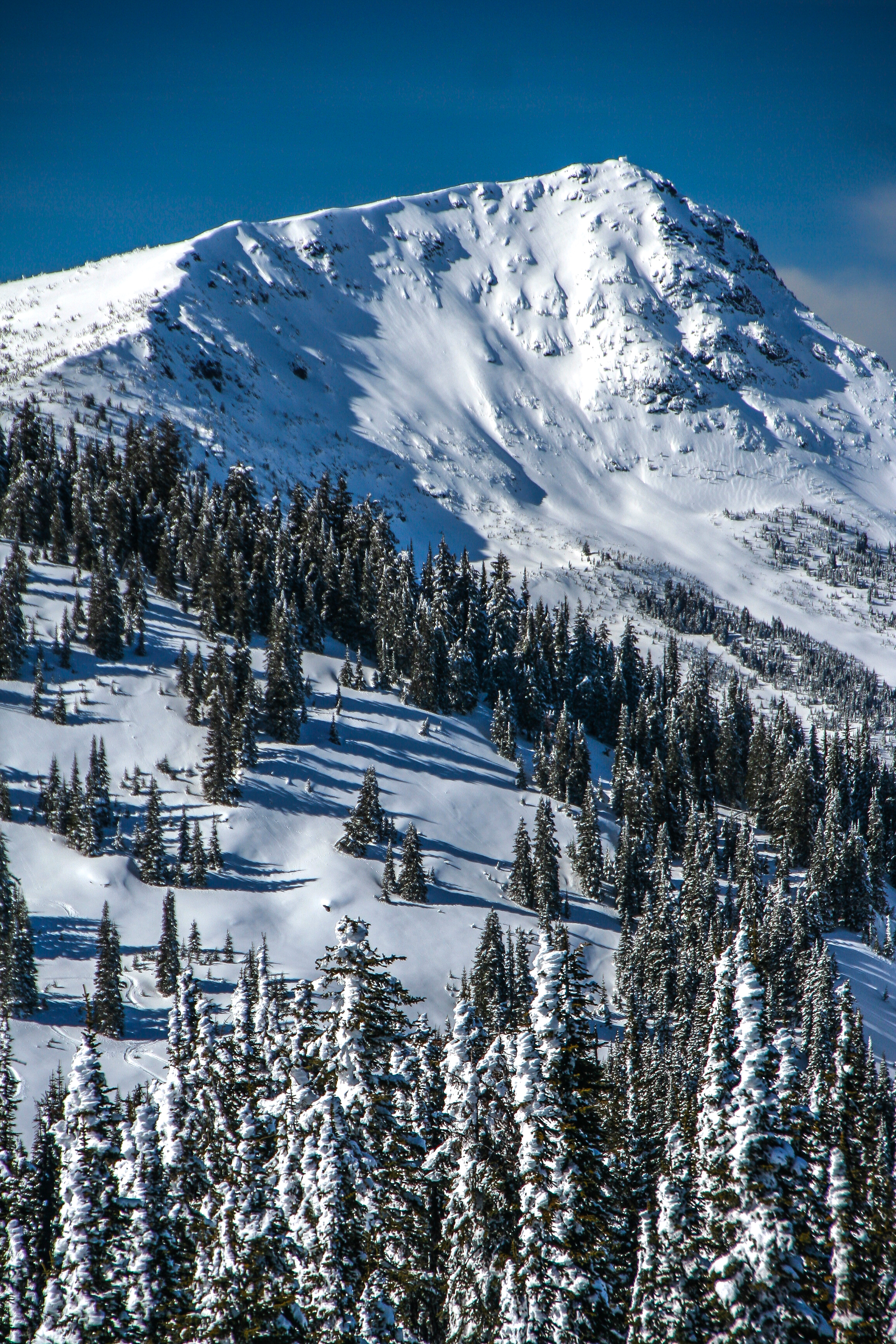
Old Glory Mountain (2376m), highest point of Rossland Range

- Anstey Range
- Christina Range
- Gold Range
- Jordan Range
- Kettle River Range
- Malton Range
- Midway Range
- Okanagan Highland
  - Beaverdell Range
- Sawtooth Range
- Ratchford Range
- Rossland Range
- Scrip Range
- Shuswap Highland
- Whatshan Range

== Mountains ==
- Cranberry Mountain, 2,872 m (9,423 ft)
- Dominion Mountain, 3,131 m (10,272 ft)
- Gibraltar Mountain 1,153 m (3,783 ft)
- Gordon Horne Peak, 2,881 m (9,452 ft)
- Hallam Peak, 3,205 m (10,515 ft)
- Mount Albreda, 3,052 m (10,013 ft)
- Mount Begbie, 2,733 m (8,967 ft)
- Mount Copeland, 2,556 m (8,386 ft)
- Mount Lempriere, 3,205 m (10,515 ft)
- Mount Monashee, 3,274 m (10,741 ft)
- Mount Odin, 2,971 m (9,747 ft)
- Mount Tilley, 2,649 m (8,691 ft)
- Peak 2892, 2,982 m (9,783 ft)
- Red Mountain, 1,591 m (5,220 ft)
- The Pinnacles, 2,607 m (8,553 ft)

== Sources ==
- "Monashee Mountains". BC Geographical Names. Government of British Columbia – B.C. Geographical Names Office (BCGNO).
