= Eagle Pass (British Columbia) =

Mountain pass in British Columbia, Canada

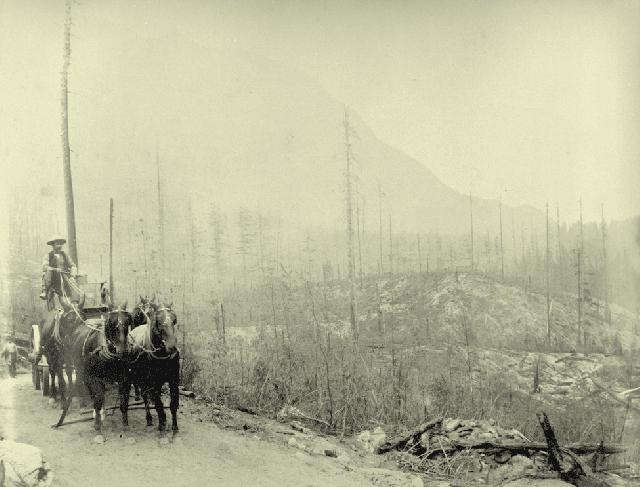
- Wagon road at the summit of Eagle Pass, c. 1885

- Location within British Columbia
- Elevation: 550 metres (1,800 ft)
- Traversed by: Canadian Pacific Railway, Highway 1 (British Columbia Highway 1)

Third Approach
- Location: British Columbia, Canada
- Range: Monashee Mountains
- Coordinates: 50°57′54″N 118°22′09″W
- Topo map: NTS 82L16 Revelstoke

Eagle Pass (elevation 550 metres or 1,804 feet) is a mountain pass through the Gold Range of the Monashee Mountains in British Columbia, Canada. It divides the Columbia River drainage basin from that of the Fraser River (via the Shuswap Lakes and the Thompson River).

Eagle Pass was chosen as the route of the Canadian Pacific Railway (CPR), and later the Trans-Canada Highway, over the Monashees. The line over the Eagle Pass was the last section of the CPR to be completed; the last spike was driven at a location known as Craigellachie in 1885.

The pass was discovered by Walter Moberly in his role as Assistant Surveyor General of British Columbia in 1865.

The nearest city to Eagle Pass is Revelstoke, 20 kilometres to the east.

== See also ==
- Eagle River (Shuswap)
