= Mount Tilley (Canada) =

Mountain in British Columbia, Canada

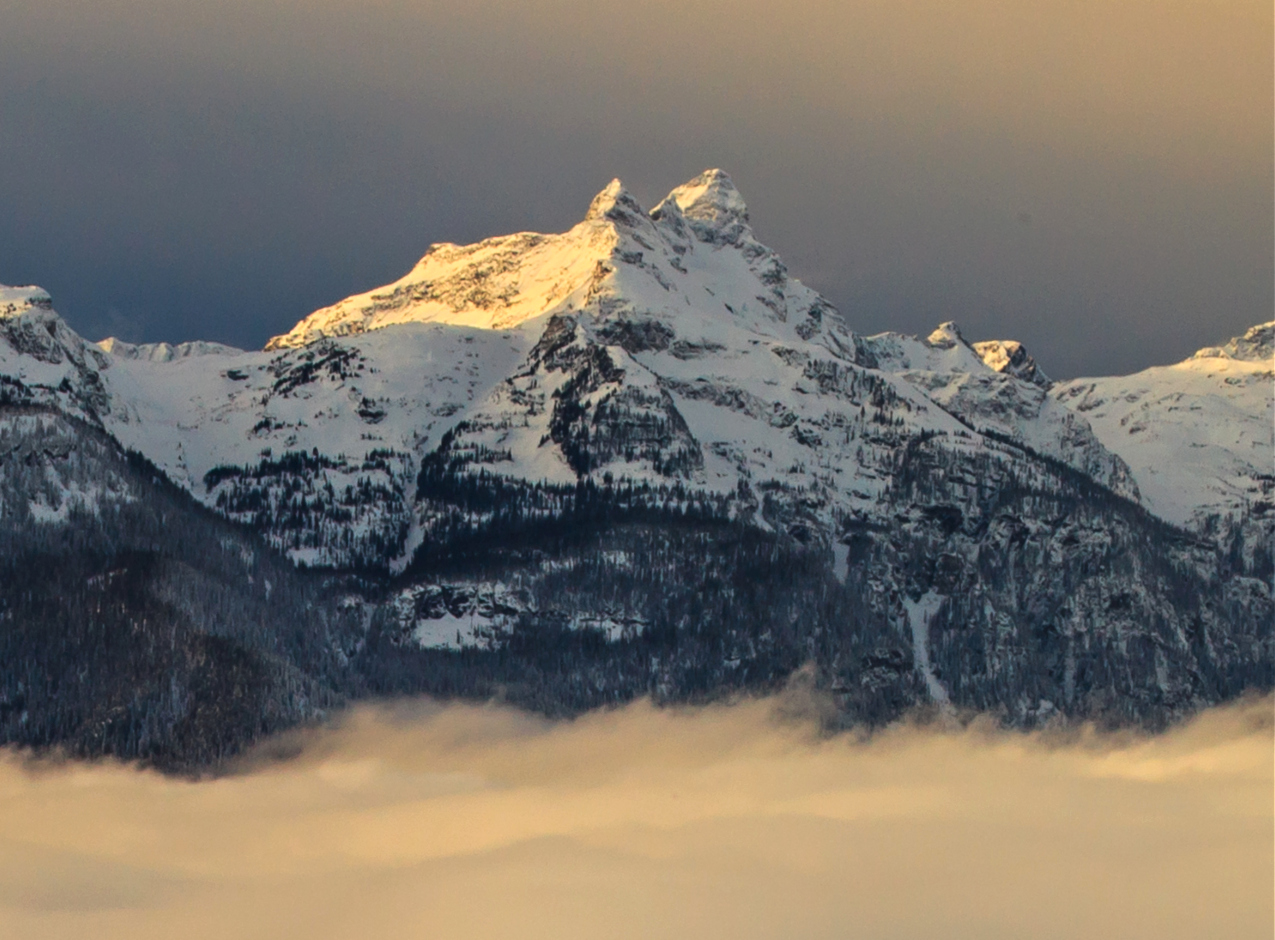
- Mount Tilley seen from Mt Revelstoke ski area

Highest point
- Elevation: 2,649 m (8,691 ft)
- Prominence: 544 m (1,785 ft)
- Parent peak: Mount Begbie (2733 m)
- Listing: Mountains of British Columbia
- Coordinates: 50°53′19″N 118°18′04″W

Geography
- Location within British Columbia Location within Canada
- Interactive map of Mount Tilley
- Location: British Columbia, Canada
- District: Kootenay Land District
- Parent range: Monashee Mountains
- Topo map: NTS 82L16 Revelstoke

Climbing
- First ascent: 1968 Bruce Haggerstone, David P. Jones
- Easiest route: Scrambling class 4 East slope

Mount Tilley is a 2,649-metre (8,691-foot) mountain summit located in the Gold Range of the Monashee Mountains in British Columbia, Canada. Situated west of the Columbia River and Upper Arrow Lake, this peak is visible from the Trans-Canada Highway, Revelstoke, and Revelstoke Mountain Resort ski area. Its nearest higher peak is Mount Begbie, 3 km (1.9 mi) to the east, with Tilley Lake set in the saddle between the two peaks.

== History ==
Mount Tilley was named for Sir Samuel Leonard Tilley (1818–1896), a Canadian politician and one of the Fathers of Confederation. The mountain's name was officially adopted in 1924 by the Geographical Names Board of Canada, although this toponym had appeared in publications as early as 1887, if not earlier. The first ascent of the mountain was made in 1968 by Bruce Haggerstone and David P. Jones.

== Climate ==
Based on the Köppen climate classification, Mount Tilley is located in a subarctic climate zone with cold, snowy winters, and mild summers. Winter temperatures can drop below −20 °C with wind chill factors below −30 °C. Despite the modest elevation, the climate supports a small pocket glacier on the northeast face. Precipitation runoff from Mount Tilley drains north into Begbie Creek, a tributary of the Columbia River, or southwest into Wap Creek, a tributary of the Eagle River, which in turn is a tributary of the Fraser River.

== Gallery ==
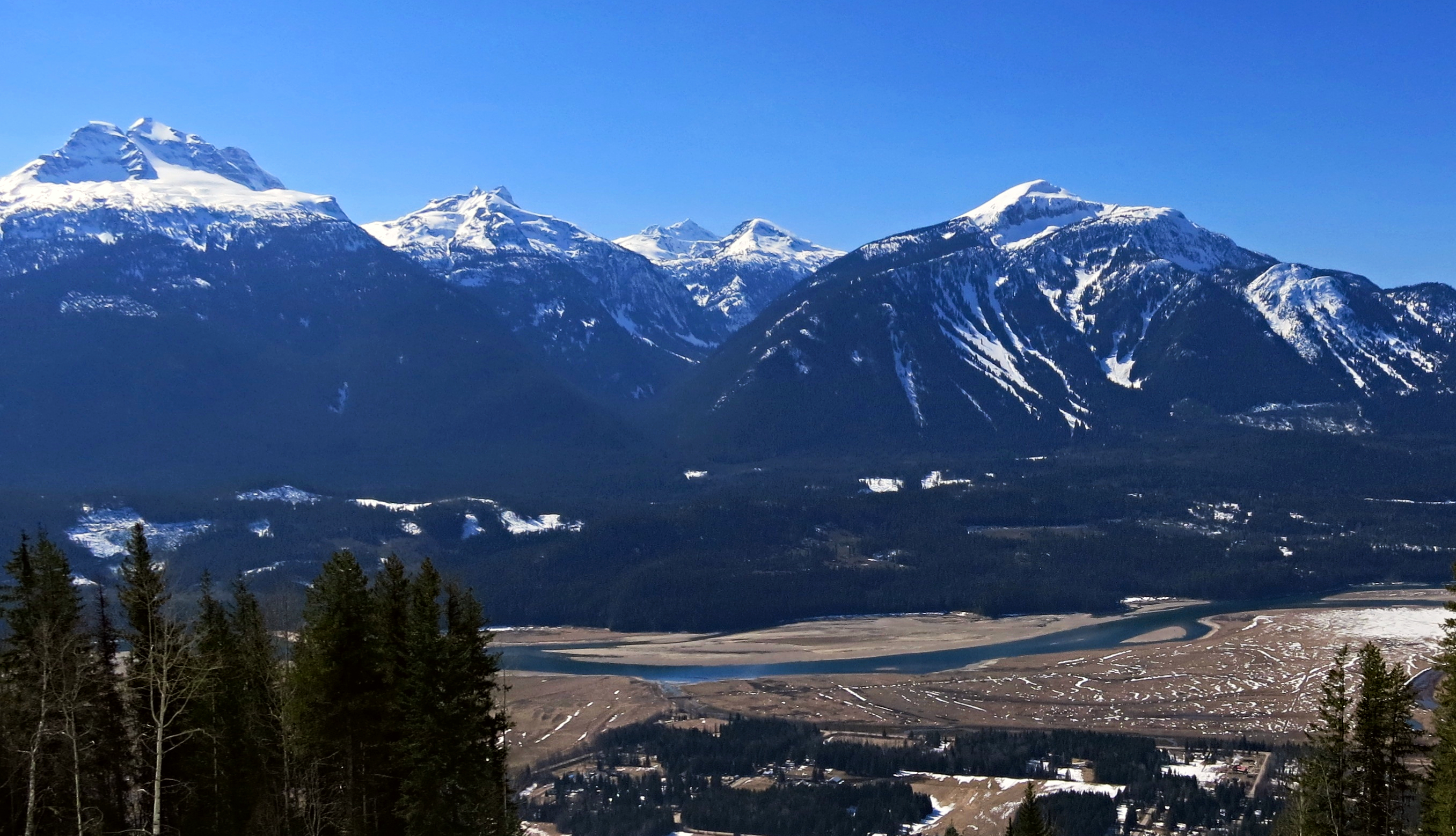
Left to right: Mts. Begbie, Tilley, English, Macpherson

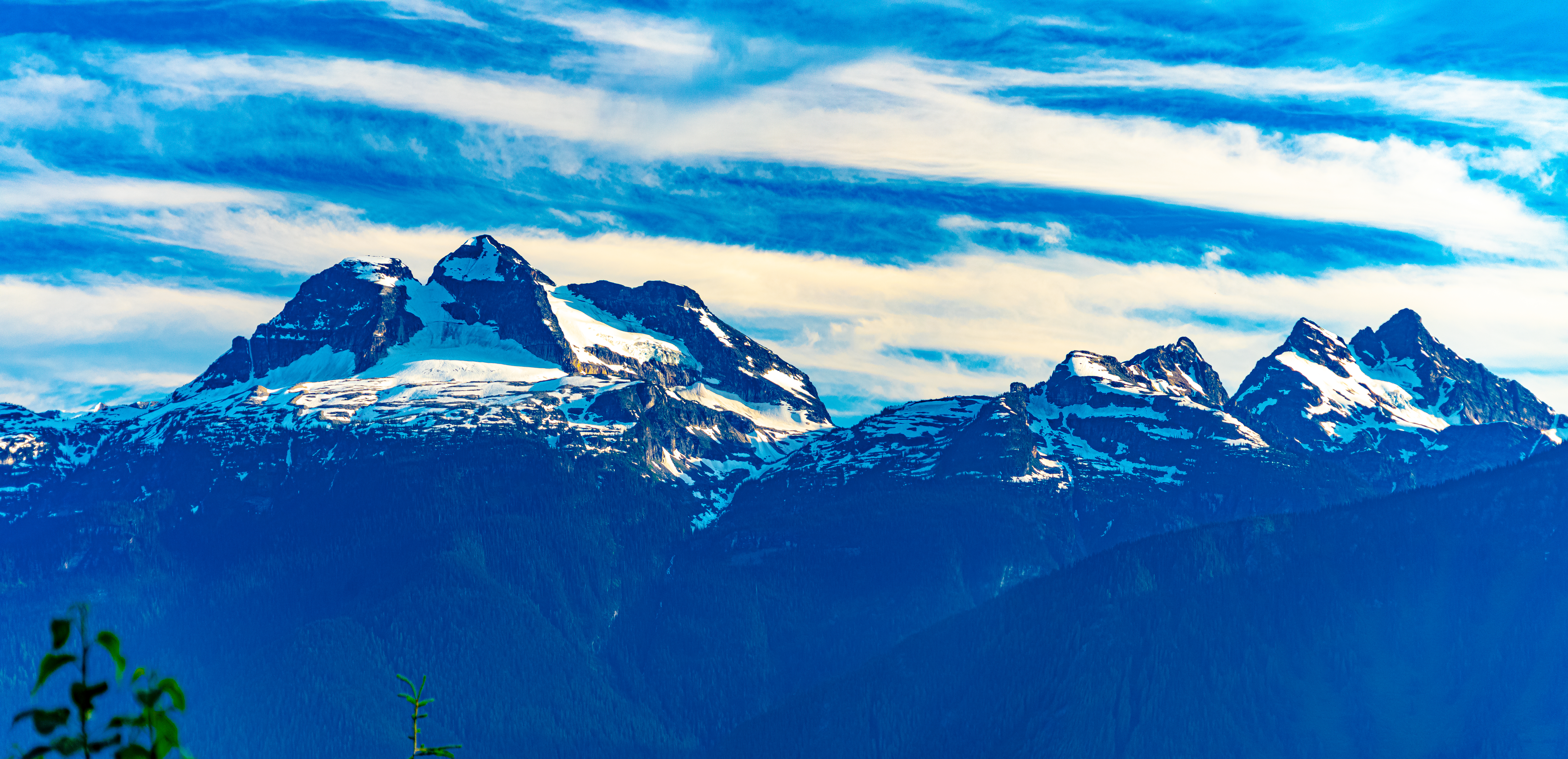
Mt. Begbie (left) and Mt. Tilley (right)
