= Mount Burnham (disambiguation) =

Mount Burnham is a mountain in California.

Mount Burnham may also refer to:

- Mount Burnham (Marie Byrd Land), Antarctica
- Mount Burnham (Oates Land), Antarctica
- Mount Burnham (Victoria Land), Antarctica
- Mount Burnham (British Columbia), Canada
