= Racial bias in criminal news in the United States =

Racial bias in criminal news occurs when a journalist's racial biases affect their reporting. Racial biases are a form of implicit bias, which refers to the attitudes or stereotypes that affect an individual's understanding, actions, and decisions in an unconscious manner. These biases, which encompass unfavorable assessments, are often activated involuntarily and without the awareness or intentional control of the individual. Residing deep in the subconscious, these biases are different from known biases that individuals may choose to conceal for the purposes of social and/or political correctness. (Note: See racism (synonym for "racial bias") for more information.) Police officers have implicit bias, regardless of their ethnicity. Racial bias in criminal news reporting in the United States is a manifestation of this bias.

== Racial bias against African Americans ==
Racial bias has been recorded in criminal news reporting from the United States, particularly with regard to African American individuals, and a perceived fear of African Americans among European and White Americans. Historically, racism against African Americans has consisted of beliefs about African American intelligence, ambition, honesty, and other stereotypes, as well as support for segregation and support for acts of open discrimination.

Dana Mastro's research on racial bias in the United States reveals persistent racial prejudice among whites, characterizing African Americans as violent and aggressive. These beliefs have been found to manifest in a heightened fear among whites of victimization at the hands of racial minorities, specifically African American males. Both theory and empirical evidence indicate that media exposure contributes to the construction and perpetuation of these perceptions by disproportionately depicting racial/ethnic minorities as criminal suspects and whites as victims in television news. Further consuming these messages has been shown to provoke prejudicial responses among white viewers.

Robert Entman suggests that today's media environment suggests that old-fashioned racial images are socially undesirable and stereotyping is now subtler and stereotyped thinking is reinforced at levels likely to remain below conscious awareness. Rather than grossly demeaning distortions of yesterday's stereotyping now there is a grey area allowing for denial of the racial component. The phrase "threatening black male" allows for a negative attribute rather than an attack on racial identity.

Twitter, one of the more widely used forms of social media, with over 271 million active users, is the choice of the Millennial generation to get breaking news. Using hashtags, such as #michaelbrown, when they post allows for individuals to find information in a simpler manner.

The study conducted in the article Race and Punishment states that current crime coverage strategies aim to increase in the importance of a crime, thus distorting the public sense of who commits crimes, and leads to biased reactions. By over-representing whites as victims of crimes perpetrated by people of color it exaggerates crimes committed by African Americans and downplays the victimization of African Americans. For example, the majority of US homicides are intra-racial, but media accounts often portray a world in which African American male offenders are overrepresented.

=== African American suspects presentation in news ===
A study by the Sentencing Project reports that African American crime suspects were presented in more threatening contexts than whites; to specify, African American suspects were more often left unnamed and were more likely to be shown as threatening by being depicted in the physical custody of the police.

Analyses of television news consistently indicate that African American males are overrepresented as perpetrators and underrepresented as victims, compared to both their white male counterparts on TV as well as real-world Department of Justice arrest reports. In these news stories, African American suspects are more likely than whites to be portrayed as nameless, menacing, and in the grasp of the police. Some evidence also suggests that audiences know the news they watch misrepresents the reality of race and crime in the United States, and those news executives know their broadcasts scare their audiences.

Dana Mastro reports that African Americans are nearly four times more likely to be represented as criminals than police officers on television news—a proportion inconsistent with U.S. Department of Labor statistics. Alongside their overrepresentation as criminals in the news, African Americans also are underrepresented as victims compared with their on-air counterparts. Another study by Dixon and Williams had also concluded that is still the case in cable news channels with one difference. African American homicide victims being may be more likely shown on cable networks than on television networks when national stories like the Trayvon Martin Fatal Shooting receive constant coverage on news cycles, thus receiving more airtime on cable owned twenty four hour runs programing. This particular study also came to the conclusion that when studying this bias they would need to include a larger population of programs with more "polarizing on-air" personality, and across different parts of the country with different age groups.

Further, the text of crime-related news stories also has been found to vary depending on the race of the perpetrator. For example, Dixon and Linz's research reveals that statements containing prejudicial information about criminal suspects, such as prior arrests, were significantly more likely to be associated with African Americans as opposed to white defendants, particularly in cases involving white victims. Exposure to biased messages has consequences. When the public consistently consumes the persistent overrepresentation of African American males in crime-related news stories it strengthens their cognitive association between Blacks and criminality in their mind such as the connection "Blacks and crime" and thus becomes chronically accessible for use in race-related evaluations such as: higher support for the death penalty because crime is more associated as a black problem that people need protection from and; that laziness is the only roadblock to success for people of color. Notably, as the research on media priming illustrates, even a single exposure to these unfavorable characterizations can produce stereotype-based responses.

Accused of Crimes in Selected Visual Depictions for all Crimes	Black	White
Accused named in still photo	48.9%	65.3%
Accused not named in still photo	51.1%	34.7%
Accused shown in motion	52.3%	66.3%
Accused not shown in motion	47.7%	33.7%
Accused well dressed	45.6%	69.4%
Accused poorly dressed	54.4%	30.6%
Accused physically held	37.6%	17.6%
Accused not physically held	62.2%	82.4%

=== Journalistic practices ===
A report published by The Sentencing Project cited studies finding that journalists gravitated towards cases where whites were the victims and cases where the assailant was African American. It quoted a 2003 paper which suggested that newsworthiness was less determined by a crime's novelty or typicality than by whether it could be "scripted using stereotypes grounded in White racism and White fear of Black crime."

Robert Entman studied how television news impacted white views of blacks in his article Blacks in the News: Television, Modern Racism and Cultural Change, which examined television news stories from four Chicago stations during a 6-month period in 1989–90. He found that crime reporting depicted blacks as more dangerous—at the same time that the employment of black journalists may have led viewers to believe racism was no longer significant. He believed these two factors contributed to "modern" or "symbolic racism"—which he defined as resistance to affirmative action, welfare benefits, and a sense of blacks "pushing too hard", coupled with the belief that racial discrimination was no longer an issue. According to Entman, "modern racist" whites didn't necessarily support discrimination or believe blacks inferior, but rather felt a general "negative effect" toward blacks and much of their political agenda.

Number of pro-defense sound bites	African American Accused of Crime	White Accused of Crime
None	88.8%	70.6%
One	9.0%	18.6%
Two or more	2.2%	10.8%
Race of Police Speaking On Screen	African American Accused of Crime	White Accused of Crime
Black Police Official	32.3%	4.0%
White Police Official	48.4%	94.7%
Both Black & White Police Official	19.4%	1.3%

A smaller study delved a bit deeper into the tendency of journalistic racial bias by moving from data, to analyzing reporters. An article written by Emily Drew In Critical Studies in Media Communication journal published in 2011 reviewed data from the interviews of 31 reporters from 28 major newspapers across the U.S. Each major newspaper had at one time published a series of articles covering race relations lasting from one month to a year. Throughout the different series a common theme kept emerging, they questioned why “race relations appeared to be worsening – and racial disparities increasing”.

During the interviews, the journalists analyze why the media did not help in race relations when they held the power to do so “ just by choosing which stories to cover”. They started to investigate their own bias. They realized that two of the reasons bias most often happens in journalism is because privilege is not recognized and is due to a lack of diversity either on staff or in the city that they live and work. The journalists interviewed also recognized that this bias does not end with white reporters. One journalist was quoted, “Black folks are not immune to it either. If you get writing for a white newspaper for long enough, you start to write and even think in a white voice.”. Some short lived efforts of this study included programs aimed at hiring more people of color to staff these papers and for reporters to start becoming a part of the actual communities they were coving.

=== Media outlets and racial bias against African Americans ===
==== Fox News ====
Media Matters for America, a "progressive research and information center dedicated to comprehensively monitoring, analyzing, and correcting conservative misinformation in the U.S. media" is an outspoken critic of Fox News, frequently accusing the channel of including racial overtones in news coverage. Furthermore, an MMFA article claims that a shooting of an Australian teen was labelled a racial hate crime by Fox News. MMFA was particularly outraged over an incident where Fox News' show On The Record With Greta Van Susteren, guest Pat Buchanan claimed that "racial hate crimes [are] 40 times more prevalent in the black community than the white community."

Media Matters for America also asserted that in the March 12, 2015 edition of Fox & Friends, regarding the case of the Ferguson shootings, reporter Peter Doocy described the DOJ's finding of racial bias, emphasizing that Attorney General Eric Holder "floated the possibility" of dissolving the Ferguson police department as a result, while co-host Steve Doocy linked the DOJ report and Holder's response to the shooting of two police officers in Ferguson. Holder, at a press conference stated it was revenue rather than law enforcement that drove officers to target African-Americans in the community. Doocy described the shooting, saying, "a new wave of violence comes one week after Attorney General Eric Holder vowed to dismantle that city's police department", and questioned whether it was "what he wanted."

==== ABC News ====
ABC News has been seen to falter within the topic of journalism and to have a certain bias that has been painted by third parties that swayed their viewpoint. In the case of Mumia Abu-Jamal, a Philadelphia journalist and activist who was convicted and sentenced to death in 1981 for the murder of a police officer, ABC News formed a specific argument for their audience to see. Tom Gardner, a professor at Westfield State University, decided to look deeper into this case and saw many valuations within the trial that needed to be reassessed. The Media Education Foundation took this case under their wings and decided to tell the story of this controversial case with Gardner and asked "important questions about the responsibility that journalists have when it comes to issues of life and death."

The documentary Framing an Execution: The Media & Mumia Abu-Jamal looks at the way Sam Donaldson from the ABC program 20/20 covered the case. Many scholars believe that Abu-Jamal is a political prisoner and is only in jail because of his specific views and criticisms of how police have dealt with the black community. This case only got recognition after people continued to dispute that Abu-Jamal's trial was fair or lawful, to the extent that it reached national and international attention. 20/20 told this case as an emotional story, minimalizing its importance. Sam Donaldson began his interviews with the widow, Maureen Faulkner. She was portrayed as a damsel in distress, making her a more sympathetic figure. From the beginning the specific angle of ABC News and the direction of Sam Donaldson's bias could be seen. ABC stated in their letter sent to the Pennsylvania prison authorities when trying to get an interview with Abu-Jamal that they were "currently working in conjunction with Maureen Faulkner and the Philadelphia Fraternal Order of the Police."

Framing has a couple of meanings; to the filmmakers, the one that best described the behavior of 20/20 is "to falsely set someone up to look as though they are guilty." Because of the unfairness of the trial proceedings, many have argued that it is impossible for anyone to know if Abu-Jamal is guilty or not, but the way the media has framed his trial says otherwise. Mike Farrell believes that it is important to look at "the political context, the tone of the time in Philadelphia, at that period before and after to understand the context of this trial." When Mike Farrell and Ed Asner were interviewed on 20/20 by Donaldson, he had to portray them as "know-nothing dupe celebrities" once they started to sound knowledgeable. Donaldson believed that the trial wasn't unfair but that Mumia was unfair to the trial. He continues to put down Abu-Jamal and those standing up for him by negatively accusing them of taking on the behavior of a religious cult.

Thomas Gardner opined that the 20/20 program "was never really journalism to start with. It was an exercise in persuasion, in rhetoric, really unadulterated propaganda masquerading as journalism." Amnesty International stated that "numerous aspects of this case clearly failed to meet minimum international standards safeguarding the fairness of legal proceedings", and "believes that the interest of the justice would best be served by the granting of a new trial of Mumia Abu Jamal." Angela Davis, an activist, scholar, and author believes that the media purposely prevented people from understanding the case of Abu-Jamal, and that they wanted to keep the public unaware to make sure there would not be large numbers of people supporting his campaign.

==== Search engines and racial bias against African Americans ====
Professor Latanya Sweeney from Harvard University identified "significant discrimination" in Google search terms that included names typically associated with black people, and were more likely to yield results relating to criminal activities, which according to Prof. Sweeney, may expose "racial bias in society".

=== Police bias ===
The United States Department of Justice concluded that the police department of Ferguson, Missouri has been racially biased against African Americans by removing all variables other than race and that the police have routinely violated the constitutional rights of African Americans in Ferguson due to the out of control violent crime problems that the community protects from policing, following a civil rights investigation investigating the shooting of Michael Brown by the department, which sparked protests and riots in the area. Other reports indicate protests were held all around the United States as a result of Michael Brown's death in Ferguson, Missouri. Police shooting have been studied by researchers in regards to whether ethnicity plays a role in an officer's decision to use excessive force. The Department of Justice has determined black suspects are more often killed by police officers than other races. Although three-quarters of the city's population is African American, the police department is almost entirely white. This city, like many other major cities has begun making changes in the past year to try to better its racial fairness.

== See also ==
- United States incarceration rate § Editorial policies of major media
- Media bias in the United States
- Race and crime in the United States
- Factors contributing to racial bias in threat perception
