= Mount English =

Mountain summit in British Columbia, Canada

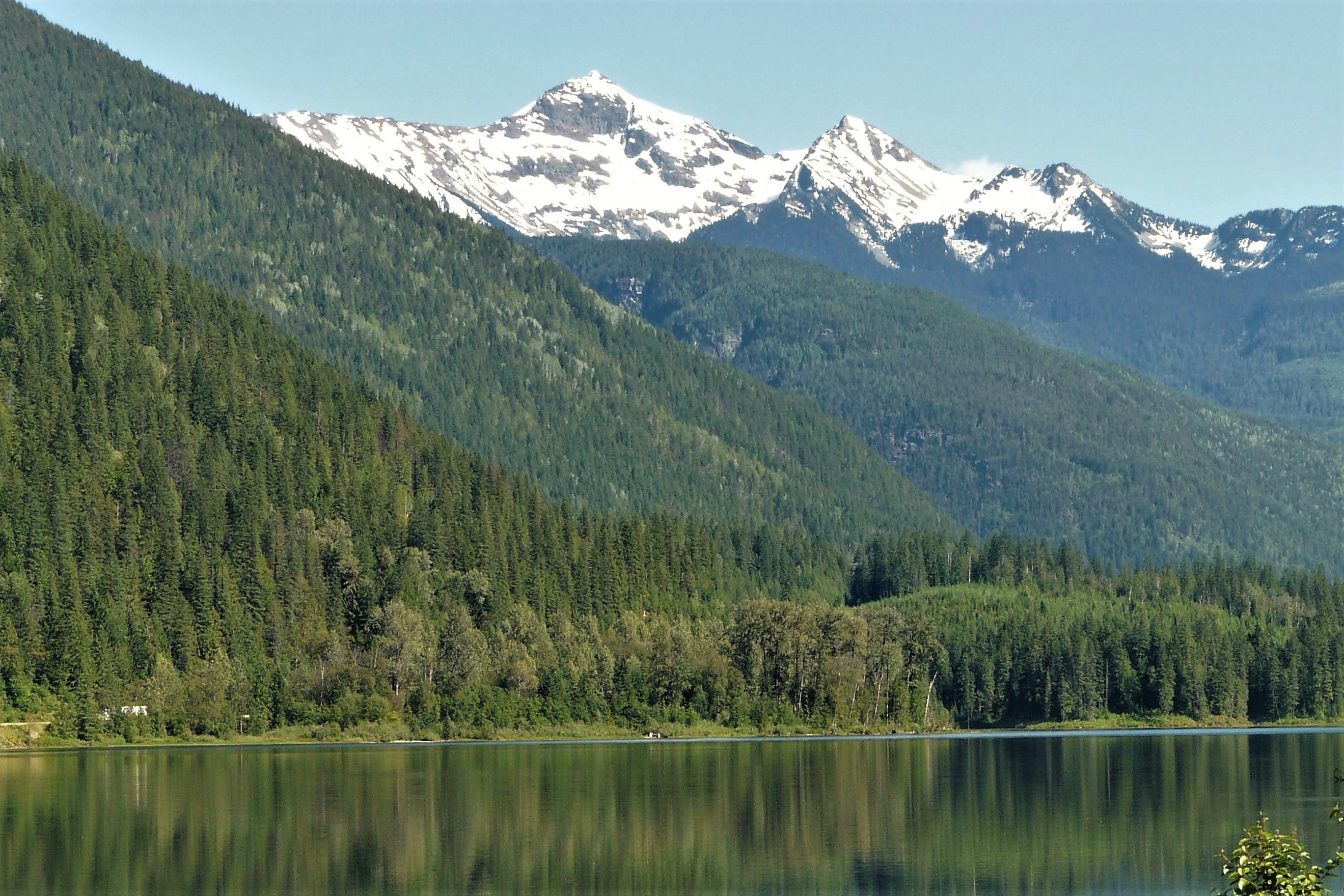
- Northwest aspect, from Griffin Lake

Highest point
- Elevation: 2,680 m (8,793 ft)
- Prominence: 578 m (1,896 ft)
- Parent peak: Mount Tilley (2,649 m)
- Isolation: 5.15 km (3.20 mi)
- Listing: Mountains of British Columbia
- Coordinates: 50°53′22″N 118°22′26″W

Naming
- Etymology: George Melville English

Geography
- Location within British Columbia Location within Canada
- Interactive map of Mount English
- Location: British Columbia, Canada
- District: Kamloops Division Yale Land District
- Parent range: Gold Range; Monashee Mountains
- Topo map: NTS 82L16 Revelstoke

Mount English is a 2,680-metre (8,793-foot) mountain summit located in the Gold Range of the Monashee Mountains of British Columbia, Canada. Situated 17 km (11 mi) southwest of Revelstoke, this peak is visible from the Trans-Canada Highway and Revelstoke Mountain Resort ski slopes. Neighbors include Mount Macpherson 8 km (5.0 mi) to the northeast, Mount Tilley 5 km (3.1 mi) to the east, and Mount Begbie is 8 km (5.0 mi) to the east. Precipitation runoff from Mount English drains into tributaries of the Eagle River. Topographic relief is significant as the summit rises 1,540 m (5,050 ft) above Wap Creek in 3 km (1.9 mi).

== Etymology ==
Mount English was named to remember George Melville English (1918–1943), a Canadian Army Sergeant from Revelstoke. He served with the Royal Canadian Artillery, but he died September 15, 1943, age 24, in an automobile accident. The mountain's toponym was officially adopted April 29, 1965, by the Geographical Names Board of Canada.

== Climate ==
Based on the Köppen climate classification, Mount English is located in a subarctic climate zone with cold, snowy winters, and mild summers. Winter temperatures can drop below −20 °C with wind chill factors below −30 °C. Despite the modest elevation, the climate supports an unnamed glacier on the northeast slope.

== Gallery ==
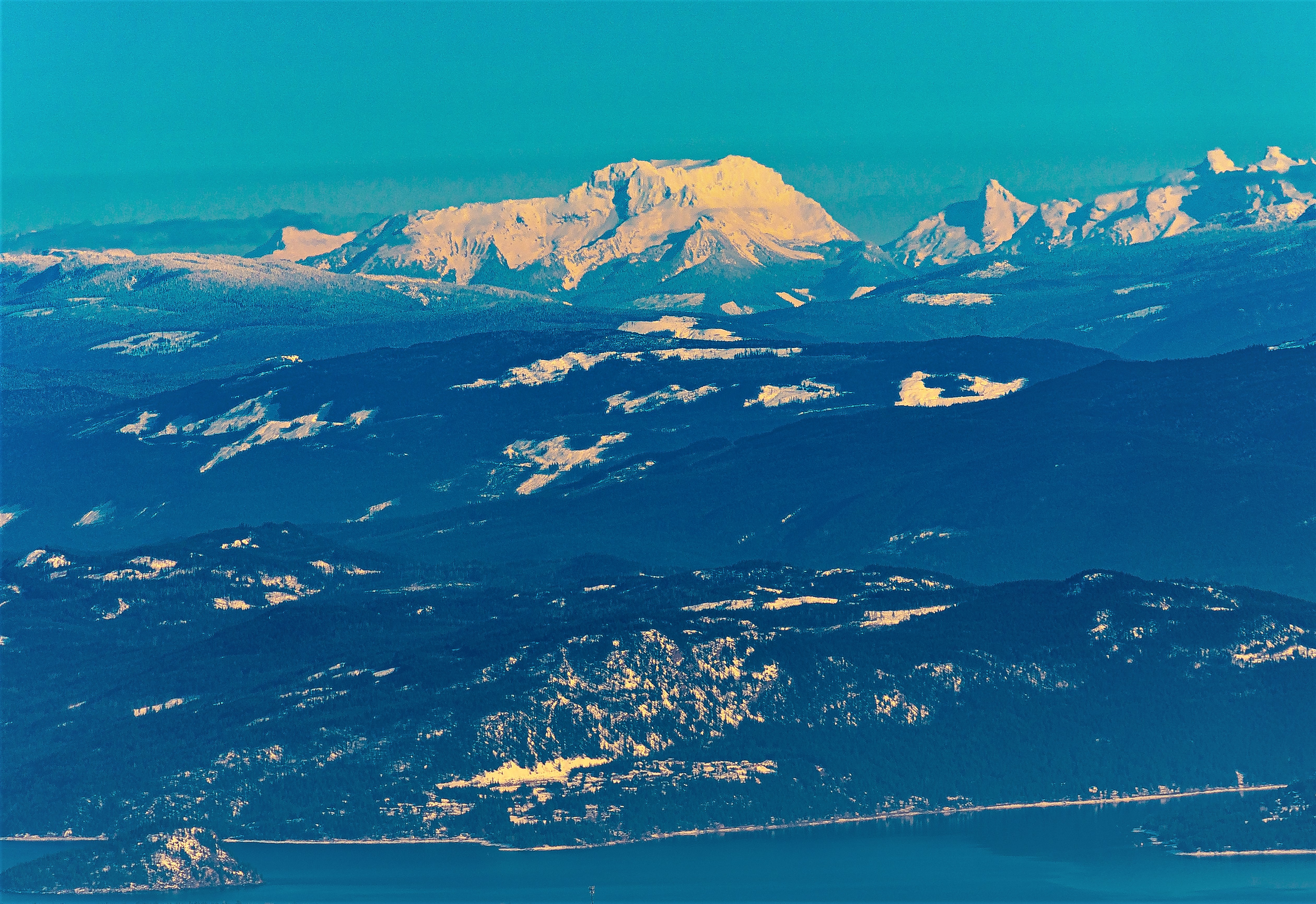
Distant view of west side of Mount English seen from Sun Peaks Resort

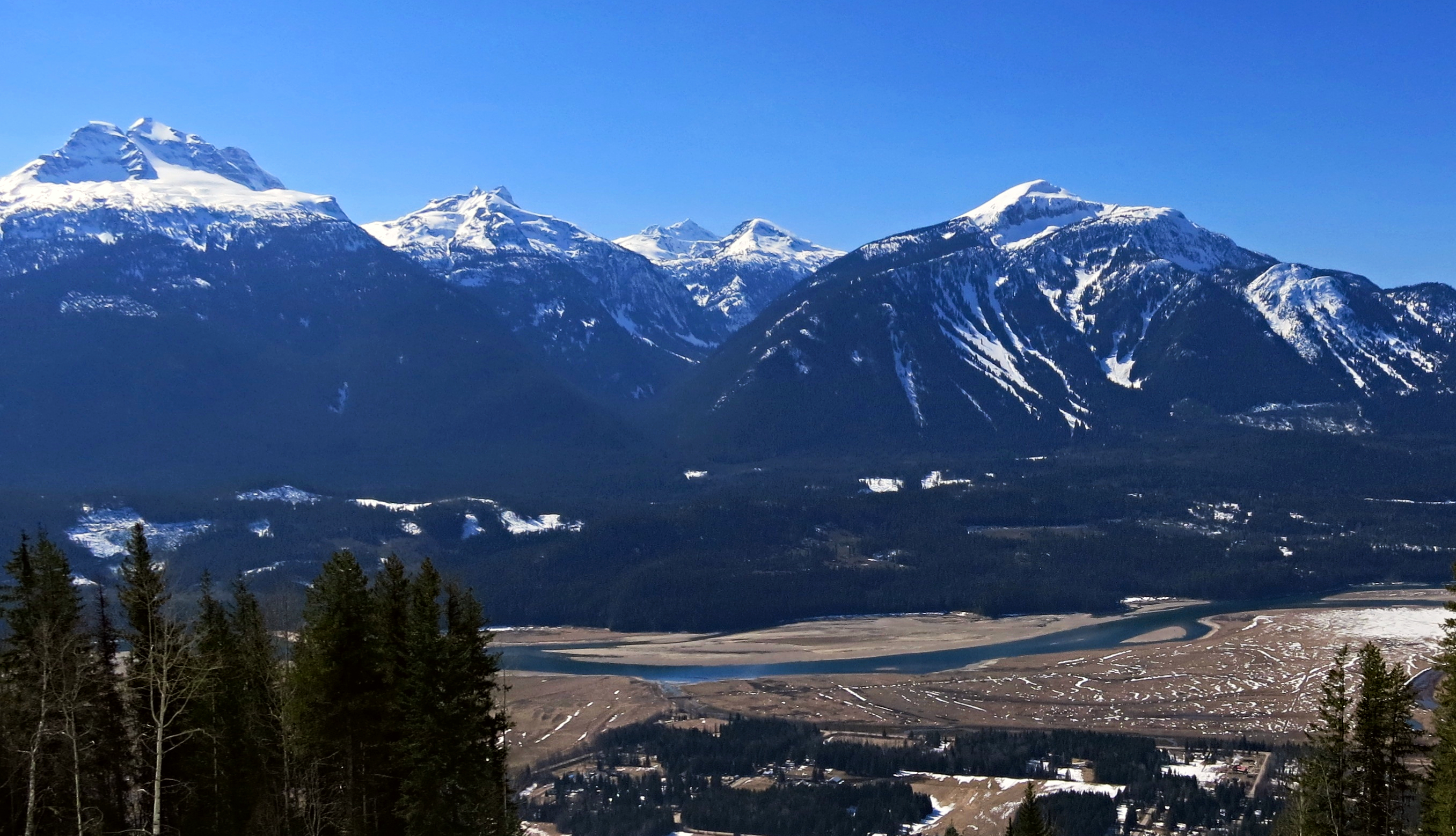
Left to right: Mts. Begbie, Tilley, English, Macpherson

== See also ==
- Geography of British Columbia
