= Mount Macpherson =

Mount Macpherson may refer to:

- Mount Macpherson (Canada) in British Columbia, Canada
- Mount Macpherson of the Geologists Range in Antarctica
