= Halcyon Hot Springs, British Columbia =

Hot springs resort and spa in British Columbia, Canada

Coordinates: 50°31′29″N 117°54′05″W

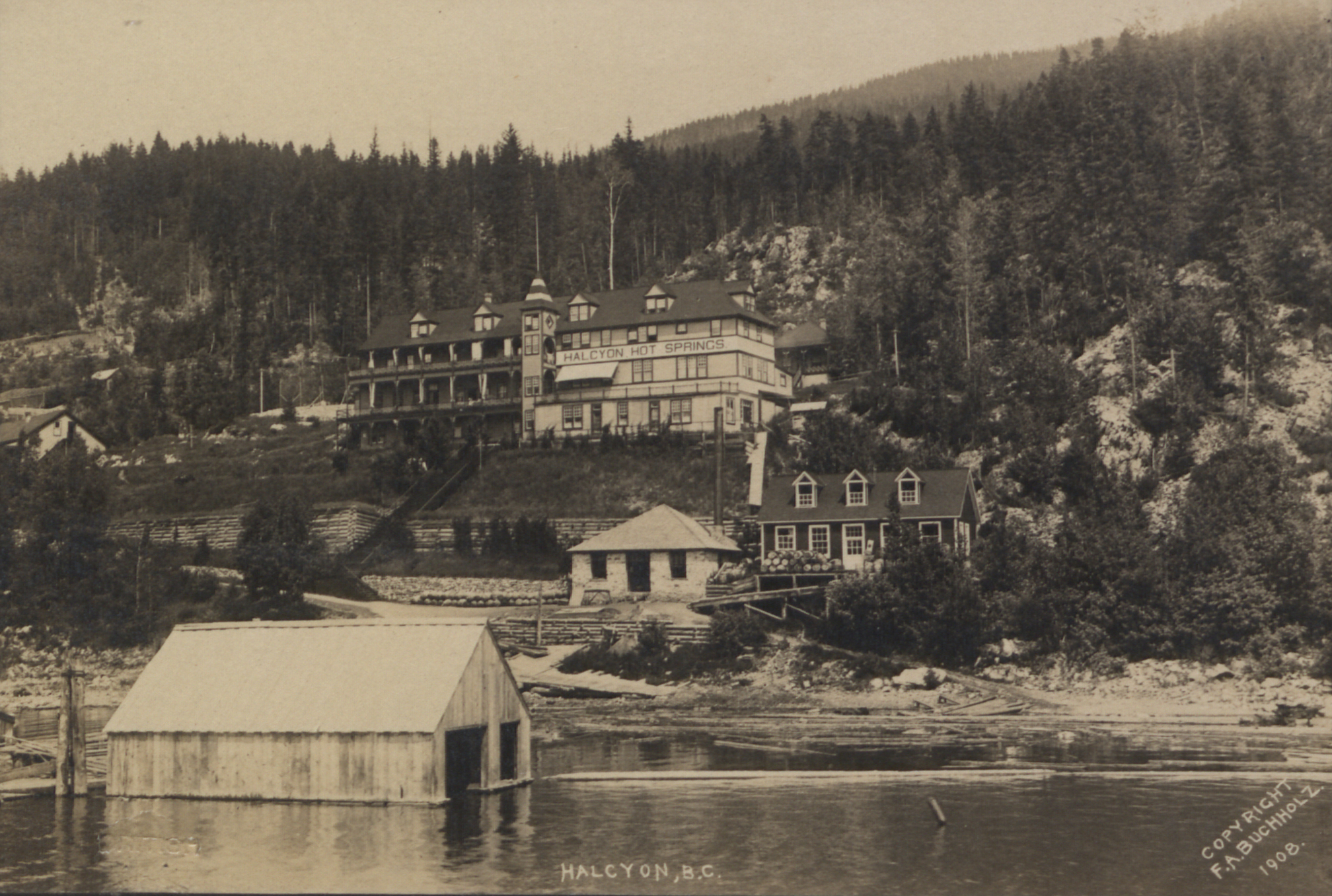
Halcyon Hot Springs, 1908, F.A. Bucholz photog.

Halcyon Hot Springs, also known simply as Halcyon, is a hot springs resort and spa on the east side of Upper Arrow Lake, between Galena Bay and Nakusp, in the West Kootenay region of British Columbia. Nearby to the northeast, Halcyon Mountain derives its name from the springs.

== History ==
The springs were known to the Sinixt and Ktunaxa peoples, who fought in the general region. First Nations people helped Robert Waldron Sanderson locate the source of the springs. By 1888, Sanderson was captain of either a steamship, or small catamaran, on the Arrow Lakes. In 1890, he bought 400 acres of crown land that included the springs.

By 1893, Sanderson had installed wooden sides to create bathing pools for several springs, and built accommodation for guests recuperating at the then named Arrow Lake hot springs, but sometimes called Sanderson's hot springs. With their increasing popularity, he opened a new hotel in September 1894, and renamed the location Halcyon Hot Springs (see halcyon), in reference to the restful surroundings of the scenery, and the believed healing powers of the pools. These developments were in partnership with Nathan Lay. On his death in 1924, Sanderson's body was brought to Halycon for burial.

In 1924, British Army Brigadier-General Dr. Frederick Burnham, who was a surgeon, restored the hotel as a sanatorium, banning smoking and drinking. He kept the tariffs affordable to equally attract working-class clients. Halcyon achieved international recognition as a place of healing, emphasizing the curative powers of the high levels of lithium in the natural hot springs water. In 1955, the hotel burnt to the ground, taking the life of Dr. Burnham. He lends his name to Mount Burnham, across from the resort. The absence of road access led to the site's abandonment.

In 1998, a lodge, cabins and hot pools were built, and opened the following year. The resort has two natural hot spring pools, a cold plunge pool, a seasonal swimming pool, restaurant, and offers lodging.

== Water profile ==
The hot spring water emerges from the ground at between 124 and 129 °F (51 and 54 °C). The soaking pool temperatures range from 99 to 104 °F (37 to 40 °C). The water is treated with chlorine and ozone. The mineral content includes sulfate, causing a sulfur smell, sodium, fluoride, and lithium.

== See also ==
- List of hot springs
- List of ghost towns in British Columbia
