= Mount Burnham (British Columbia) =

Mountain in British Columbia, Canada

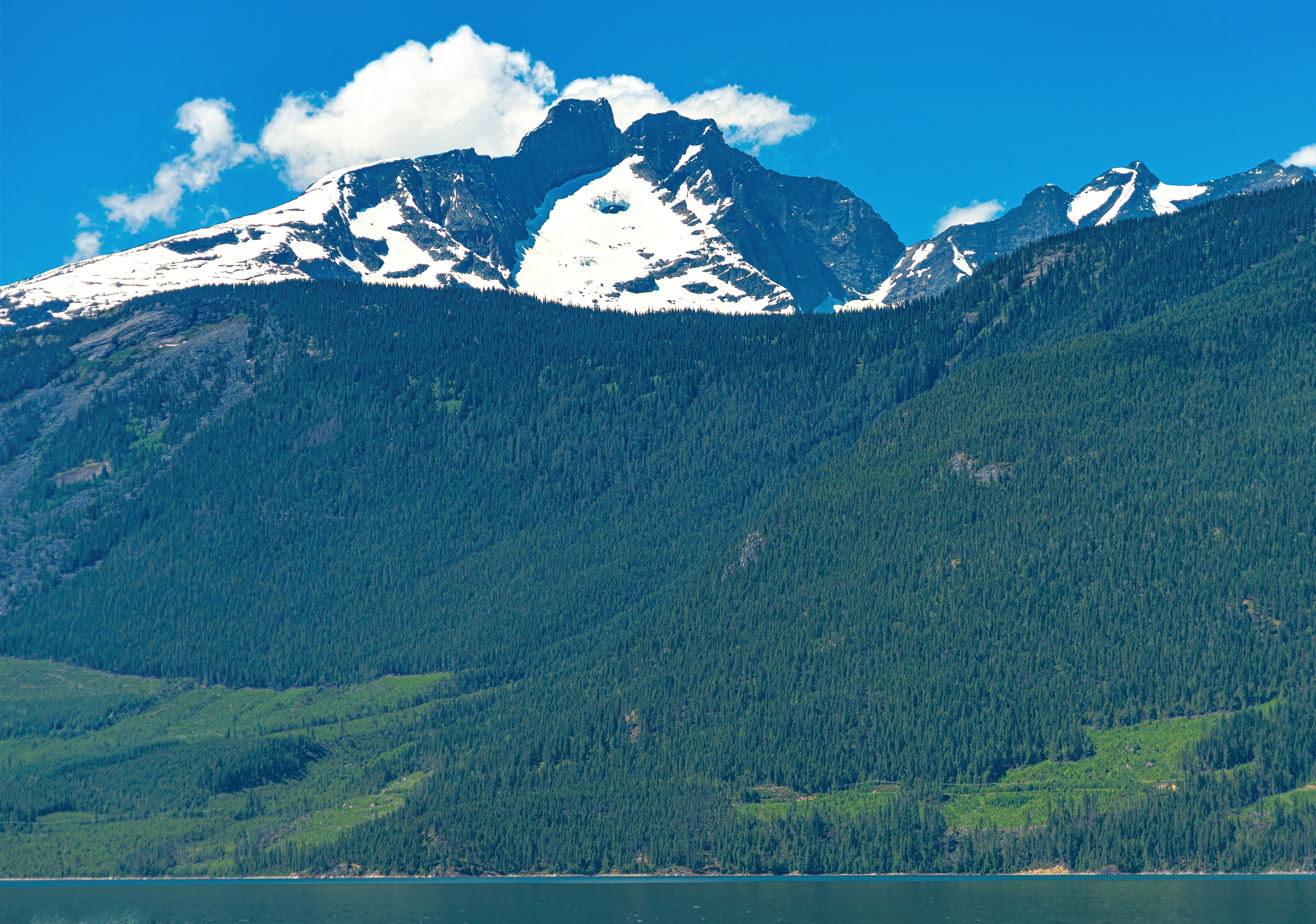
- Northeast aspect

Highest point
- Elevation: 2,869 m (9,413 ft)
- Prominence: 396 m (1,299 ft)
- Parent peak: Mount Odin (2,970 m)
- Isolation: 4.67 km (2.90 mi)
- Listing: Mountains of British Columbia
- Coordinates: 50°31′59″N 118°04′10″W

Naming
- Etymology: Frederick Burnham

Geography
- Location within British Columbia Location within Canada
- Interactive map of Mount Burnham
- Country: Canada
- Province: British Columbia
- District: Kootenay Land District
- Parent range: Monashee Mountains
- Topo map: NTS 82L9 Gates Creek

Mount Burnham is a 2,869-metre (9,413-foot) mountain summit located in British Columbia, Canada.

== Description ==
Mount Burnham is the easternmost peak in the Gold Range which is a subrange of the Monashee Mountains. The remote peak is situated 50 km (31 mi) south of Revelstoke between Upper Arrow Lake and Monashee Provincial Park. Precipitation runoff from the mountain drains east to Upper Arrow Lake which is a reservoir of the Columbia River. Mount Burnham is more notable for its steep rise above local terrain than for its absolute elevation as topographic relief is significant with the summit rising 1,800 meters (5,900 ft) above Ledge Creek in 3 km (1.9 mi) and 2,438 meters (8,000 ft) above Upper Arrow Lake in 9 km (5.6 mi).

== Etymology ==
The mountain is named after Brigadier-General Frederick William Elias Burnham (1872–1955) who operated the nearby Halcyon Hot Springs from 1924 until he perished in the fire that destroyed the Halcyon Hot Springs Hotel on February 19, 1955. He was a surgeon, philanthropist and a tireless worker against rheumatic and arthritic diseases. He had a distinguished record in World War I. The mountain's toponym was officially adopted November 14, 1963, by the Geographical Names Board of Canada.

== Climate ==
Based on the Köppen climate classification, Mount Burnham is located in a subarctic climate zone with cold, snowy winters, and mild summers. Winter temperatures can drop below −20 °C with wind chill factors below −30 °C. This climate supports a small glacier on the north slope.

== Gallery ==
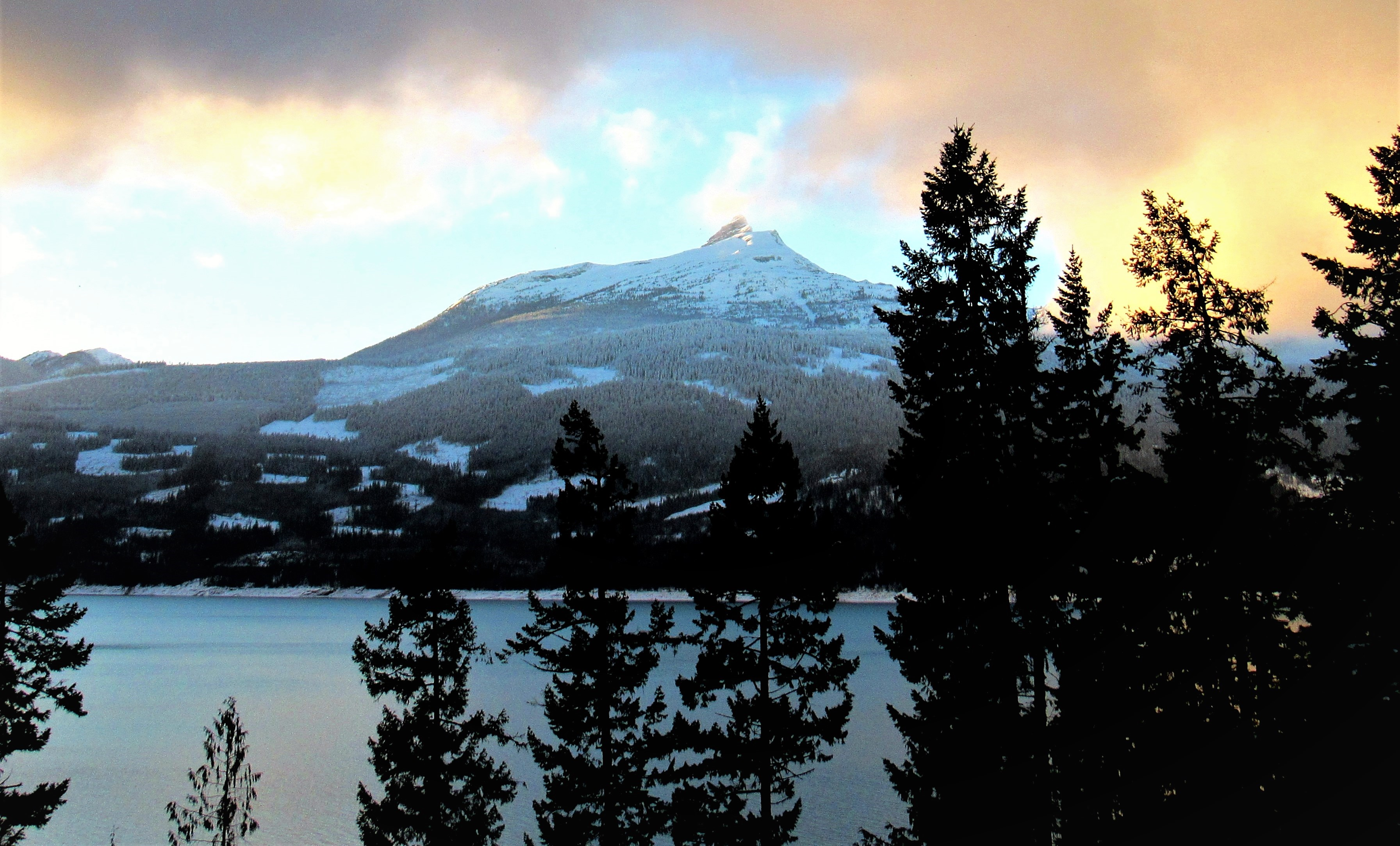
Mt. Burnham's east aspect across Arrow Lake from Halcyon Hot Springs Resort

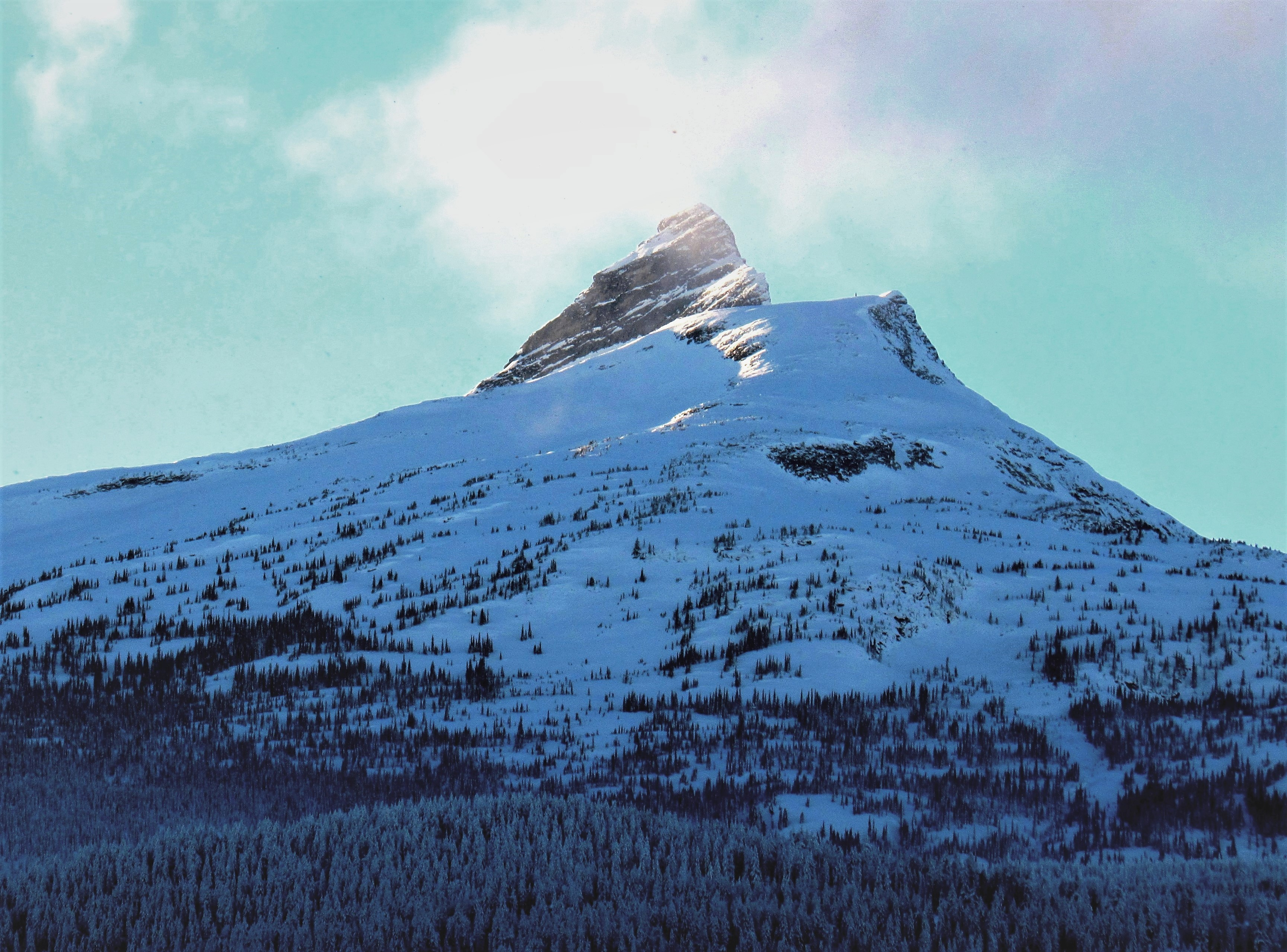
East aspect in winter from Halcyon Hot Springs Resort

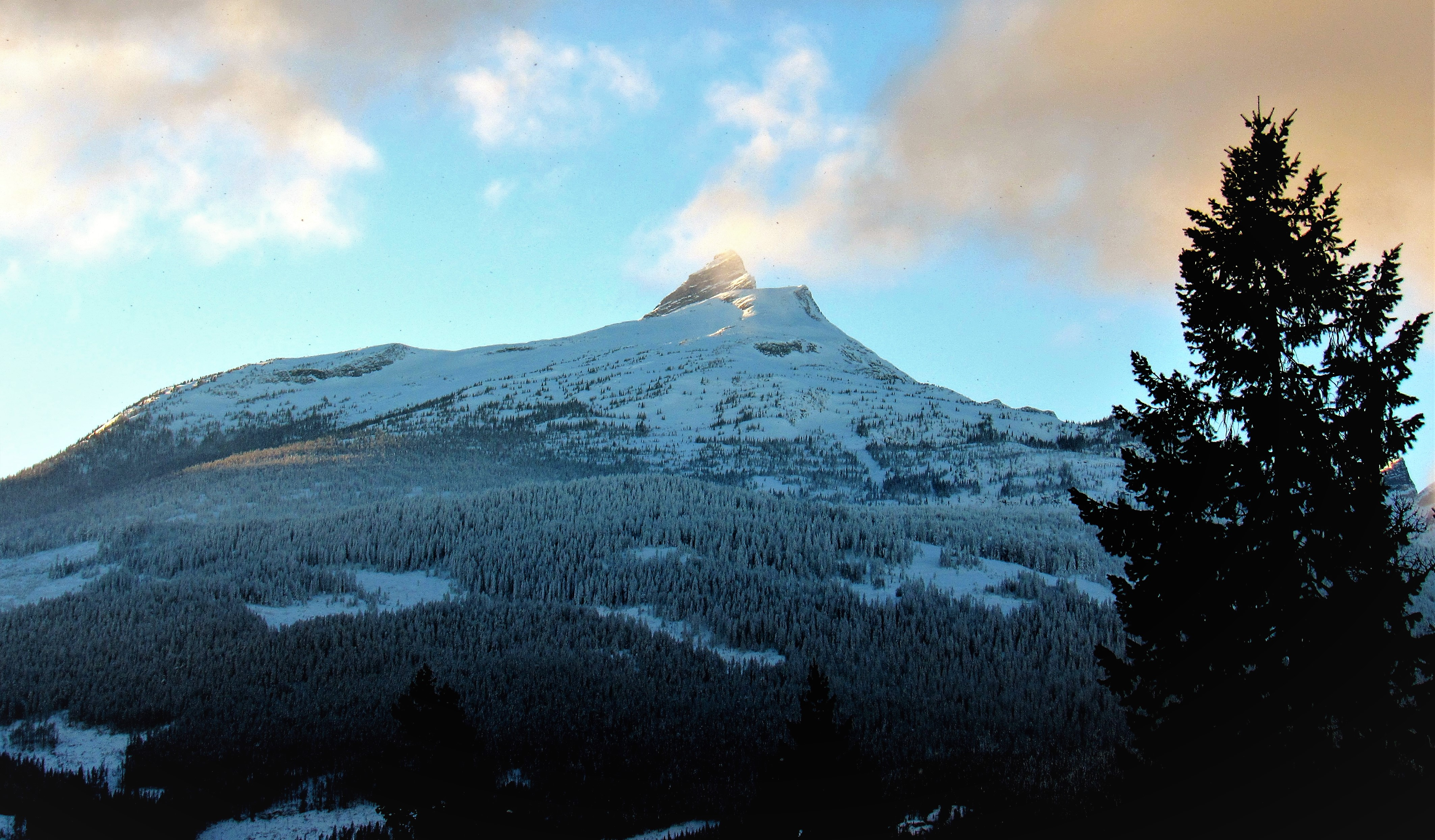
East aspect in winter from Halcyon Hot Springs Resort

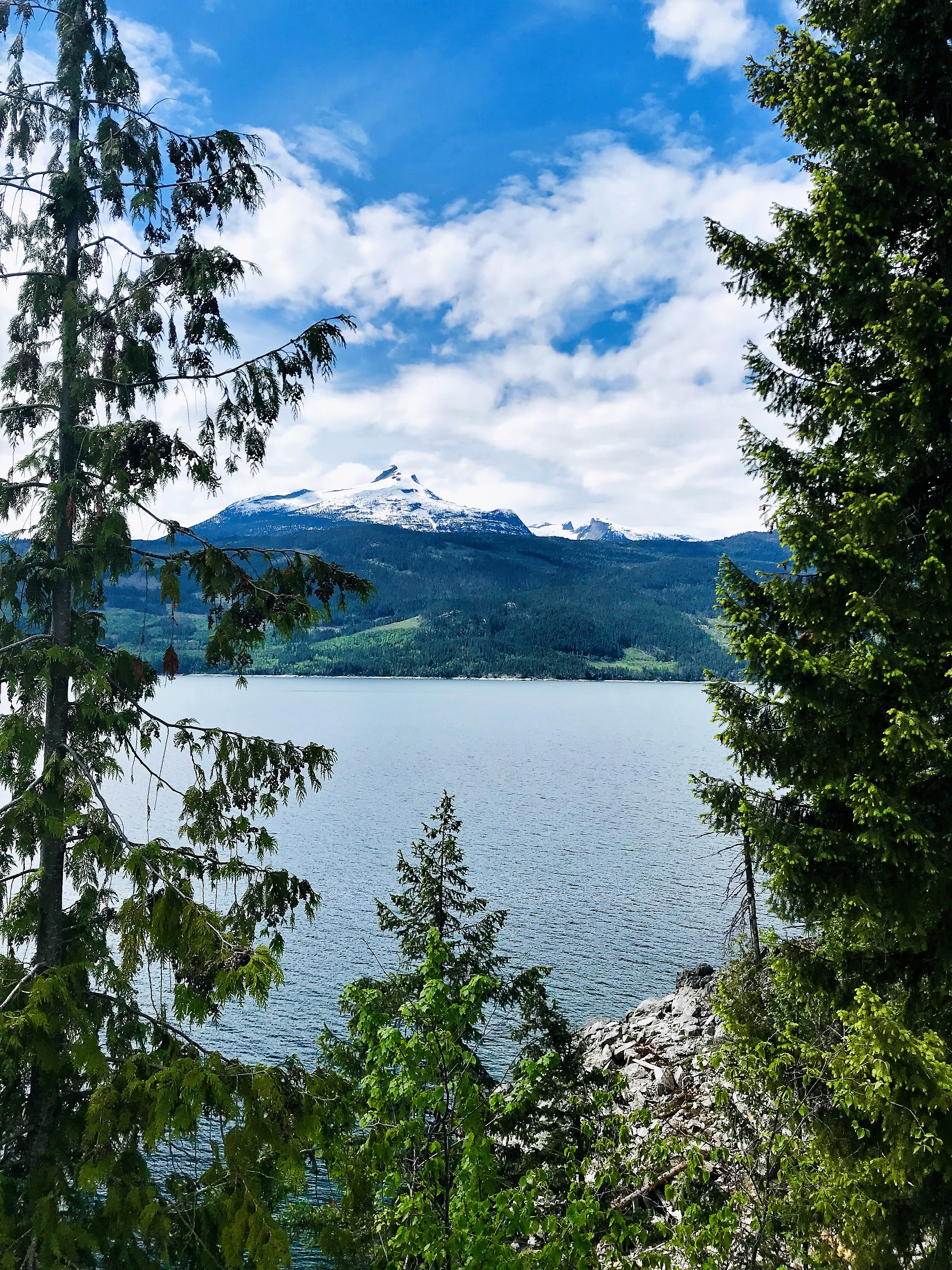
East aspect from Halcyon Hot Springs

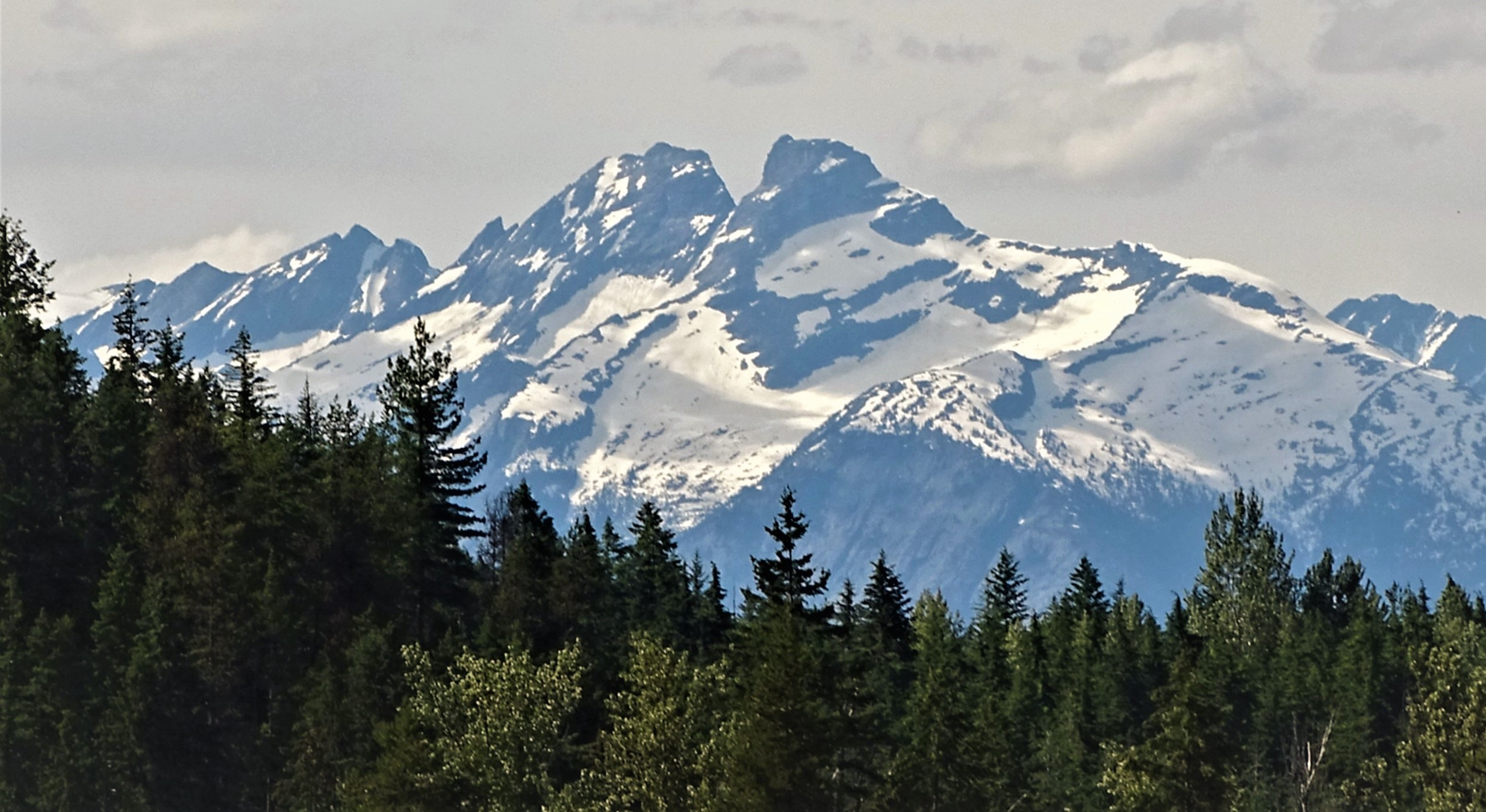
Mt. Grady / Mt. Burnham from the south

== See also ==
- Geography of British Columbia
