= Mount Macpherson (Canada) =

Mountain summit in British Columbia, Canada

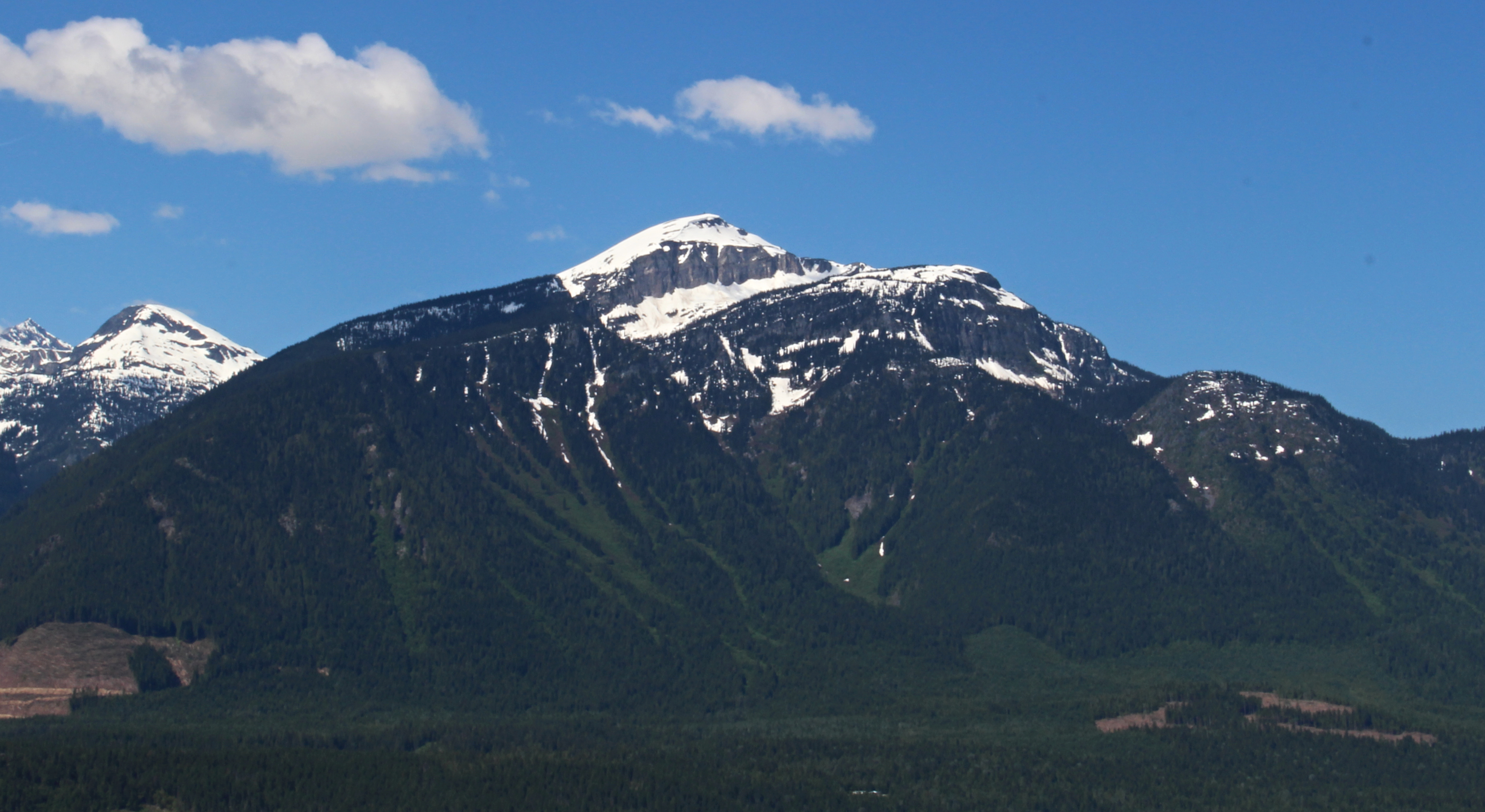
- Mount Macpherson, east aspect

Highest point
- Elevation: 2,427 m (7,963 ft)
- Prominence: 417 m (1,368 ft)
- Parent peak: Mount Tilley (2649 m)
- Listing: Mountains of British Columbia
- Coordinates: 50°55′55″N 118°17′16″W

Naming
- Etymology: David Lewis Macpherson

Geography
- Location within British Columbia Location within Canada
- Interactive map of Mount Macpherson
- Location: British Columbia, Canada
- District: Kootenay Land District
- Parent range: Gold Range; Monashee Mountains
- Topo map: NTS 82L16 Revelstoke

Mount Macpherson is a 2,427-metre (7,963-foot) mountain summit located in the Gold Range of the Monashee Mountains in British Columbia, Canada. Situated 10 km (6.2 mi) southwest of Revelstoke and west of the Columbia River and Upper Arrow Lake, this peak is visible from Revelstoke, the Trans-Canada Highway, and Revelstoke Mountain Resort ski area. Its nearest higher peak is Mount Tilley, 5 km (3.1 mi) to the south, and Mount Begbie is 5.7 km (3.5 mi) to the south-southeast.

== History ==
Mount Macpherson was named for Sir David Lewis Macpherson (1818–1896)), a Canadian businessman, member of the Senate of Canada, and Minister of the Interior. The mountain's name was officially adopted September 30, 1932, by the Geographical Names Board of Canada, although this toponym had appeared in publications as early as 1887, if not earlier.

== Climate ==
Based on the Köppen climate classification, Mount Macpherson is located in a subarctic climate zone with cold, snowy winters, and mild summers. Winter temperatures can drop below −20 °C with wind chill factors below −30 °C. Despite the modest elevation, the climate supports a small pocket glacier on the northeast face. Precipitation runoff from Mount Macpherson drains north into tributaries of the Columbia River.

== Gallery ==
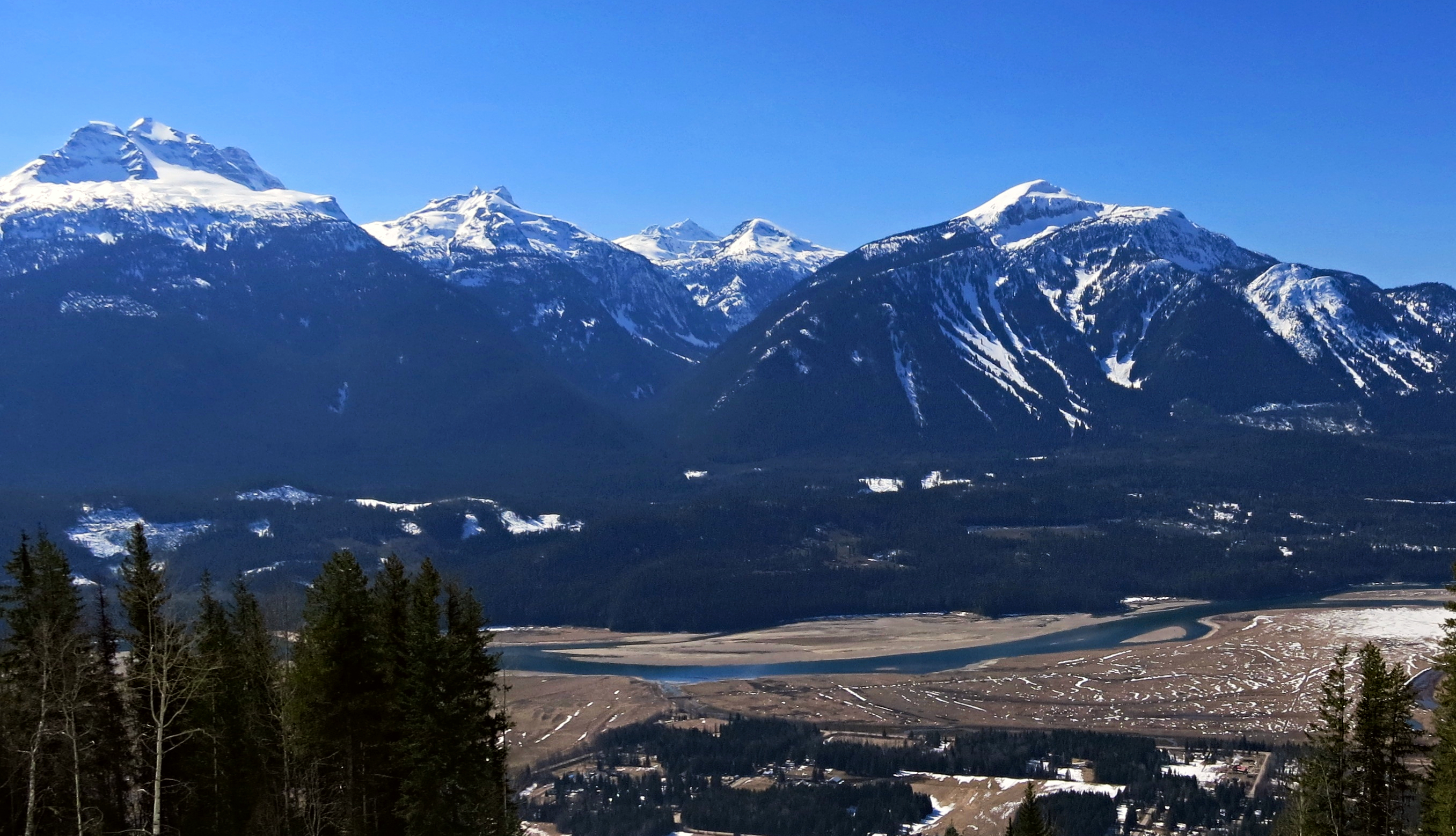
Left to right: Mts. Begbie, Tilley, English, Macpherson

== See also ==
- Geography of British Columbia
