= Gold Range =

Mountain range in British Columbia, Canada

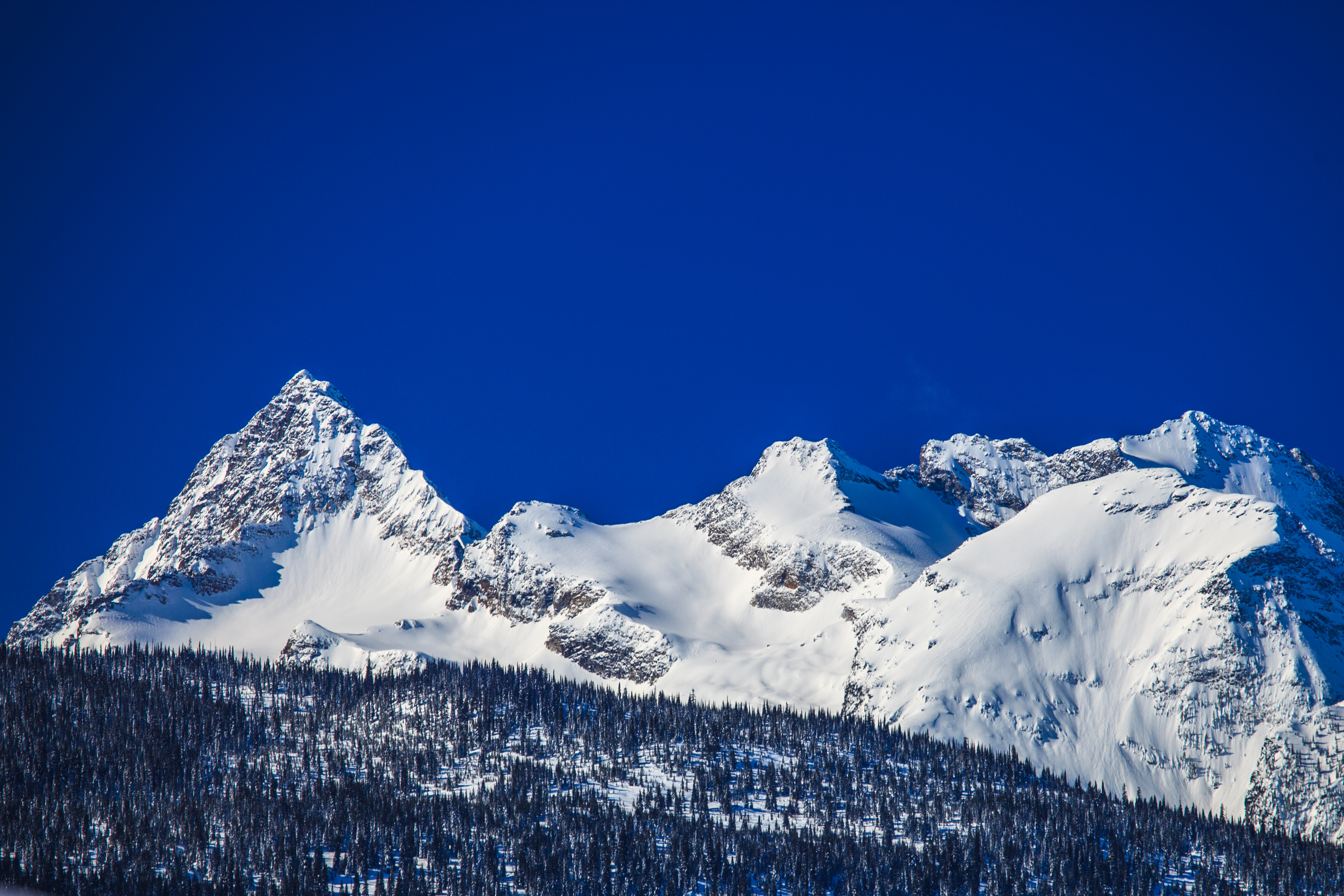
- Mount Thor and its subpeaks

Highest point
- Peak: Mount Odin
- Elevation: 2,971 m (9,747 ft)
- Listing: Mountains of British Columbia

Geography
- Location within British Columbia
- Country: Canada
- Province: British Columbia
- District: Kootenay Land District
- Range coordinates: 50°38′N 118°10′W
- Parent range: Monashee Mountains

The Gold Range is a subrange of the Monashee Mountains in the southern British Columbia Interior. This range originally applied to all of the Monashees between the Arrow Lakes and the Okanagan but today only applies to a narrow stretch of the Monashee Mountains' eastern flank adjoining Upper Arrow Lake, west of the upper Shuswap River.

== List of mountains ==
| Mountain / Peak | Elevation | | Coordinates |
| Mountain / Peak | m | ft | Coordinates |
|---|---|---|---|
| Mount Odin | 2,971 | 9,747 | 50°33′6″N 118°7′45″W |
| Mount Thor | 2,939 | 9,642 | 50°35′38″N 118°6′6″W |
| Mount Burnham | 2,869 | 9,413 | 50°31′59″N 118°4′10″W |
| Mount Begbie | 2,733 | 8,967 | 50°53′5″N 118°15′21″W |
| Mount English | 2,680 | 8,790 | 50°53′22″N 118°22′26″W |
| Mount Tilley | 2,649 | 8,691 | 50°53′19″N 118°18′4″W |
| Mount Macpherson | 2,427 | 7,963 | 50°55′55″N 118°17′16″W |

== See also ==
- Columbia Mountains
