= Mount Odin (British Columbia) =

Mountain in British Columbia, Canada

- Location within British Columbia

Highest point
- Elevation: 2,971 m (9,747 ft)
- Prominence: 2,409 m (7,904 ft)
- Listing: Mountains of British Columbia; North America prominent 42nd; Canada highest major peaks 69th; Canada most prominent 15th
- Coordinates: 50°33′06″N 118°07′45″W

Geography
- Country: Canada
- Province: British Columbia
- District: Kootenay Land District
- Parent range: Gold Range; Monashee Mountains
- Topo map: NTS 82L9 Gates Creek

Mount Odin is a mountain in British Columbia, Canada. The mountain was likely named by George Dawson as his map contains the earliest known appearance of the name.

Mount Odin is notable for being the highest mountain peak in the Gold Range of the Monashee Mountains, and for its significant topographic relief of approximately 1,931 metres (6,335 ft) to adjacent valleys and 2,542 metres (8,340 ft) to Upper Arrow Lake, 12.5 kilometres (7.8 mi) to the east.

The summit is most commonly reached by ascending the southern or eastern sides, accessible via a network of logging roads from Highway 23. The eastern terrain contains Frigg Creek, several glacial lakes, and the Frigg Glacier.

== See also ==
- Highest mountain peaks of Canada
- List of the most prominent summits of North America
- Most isolated mountain peaks of Canada
