= Factors contributing to racial bias in threat perception =

The relationship between racial prejudice and threat of possession is a complex and sensitive topic of research in contemporary society, especially when discussing the systematic prejudice faced by the black community. Research has shown that sociocultural stereotypes and subconscious prejudices have a profound impact on the public's perception of black people's aggressive behaviour. Such prejudices not only involve daily interactions, but may also lead to the use of irrational force in law enforcement.

Research in experimental social psychology has revealed how racial prejudice affects aggression perception, including traditional evaluations of facial features, the social environment's regulation of perception, and the nervous system's rapid processing of stereotypes. These studies not only help to understand the cognitive mechanisms of prejudice, but also provide possible intervention strategies to reduce racial prejudice, such as improving social cognition through exposure to anti-stereotype information, professional training, and cross-cultural understanding.

== Prototypicality ==
Prototypicality is the degree to which an individual fits the prototype of a group they could be categorized within. Prototypicality relates to threat perception in that the more prototypical an individual looks, specifically focusing on Blacks, the more others who associate Blacks with they stereotype of dangerousness will perceive them as threatening. Prototypic black targets display physical traits stereotypically associated with Blacks (broad nose, large lips, coarse hair, darker skin tone). Prototypicality affected prejudice; it was shown to impact judgments about an individual's characteristics. For example, a study by Ma & Corell (2011) showed that individuals are more biased and prejudiced against more prototypic black targets than less prototypic targets.

In daily life, individuals are more likely to encounter white people as the default race within the United States as opposed to Black individuals. When encountering atypical whites (white people with features associated with Blackness), individuals ultimately settle on a White response (the general response to typical white targets is to decide not to shoot quicker and more frequently than in trials with black targets), in contrast to encountering Blacks with atypical features where Black cues appear to be more dominant and elicit a Black (to decide to shoot quicker and more frequently than trials with white targets) due to a misplaced threat perception. Lay people are more racially biased, on average, than trained individuals such as police officers. Prototypicality is shown to moderate racial bias which has been shown to be linked to a perceived threat as black people specifically are predisposed to being viewed as more threatening. Police officers show a reduced racial bias in comparison to members of the community; however, police officers were no better than community members in their sensitivity to prototypic targets providing evidence that prototypicality is directly linked to stereotypes and threat perception which ultimately perpetuates stereotype threat. Members of the same category (race) become harder to distinguish from other members of the same category the more they look like a prototypical representation of their category. (Young, Hugenberg, Bernstein, Sacco 2009).

=== Racial ambiguity defies prototypicality ===
Racial ambiguity is linked to prototypicality in that racially ambiguous individuals walk a line of not always looking prototypical of either group they represent, but being a blend of the various groups. This can leave blurred lines in terms of threat perception in having difficulty categorizing a racially ambiguous individual and determining what perception is more accurate: a more threatening perception in line with black stereotypes or a less threatening perception akin to white stereotypes. (Young, Hugenberg, Bernstein, & Sacco 2009). Racially ambiguous faces get more racial bias than white faces and less racial bias than black faces, acting as an intermediate, on average. There is evidence for the implicit associations of slight differences in facial features. The degree to which racially ambiguous faces appeared most in line with the prototypical representation of a race, either black or white, directly activated and impacted the evaluations of participants associated with the respective group. This then bolstered stereotypes and the predisposition of individuals to be judges and evaluated based on stereotypes. This also has potential to breed stereotype threat into a marginalized population. In a white-only context, racially ambiguous individuals are viewed as more prototypically Black, and thus more threatening, whereas in a Black-only context, racially ambiguous individuals are viewed as less prototypically black. Facial features matter when associating a racially ambiguous individual with an evaluative association of a respective group.

Perceptions of threat based on stereotypes associated with one's physicality can certainly promote stereotype threat, as a person's physicality that often associates them with a race-based stereotype is not easily changed. Hypodescent is a phenomenon that is present in racially ambiguous individuals being categorized into the racial group associated with their more “socially-subordinate heritage.” This concept is a demonstration of a way in which the categorization of racially ambiguous individuals can influence the longevity of a stereotype by supporting a subordinate heritage of any individual based on race. However more difficult to categorize individuals who tend to look more similar to the prototypical representation of their dominant race (for example: 90-10 Black:White) than it is to distinguish a more racially ambiguous individual (60-40 Black:White) which is very ironic in that one might think the more prototypical you look, the easier it would be to assign you to a racial category to assess your perceived threat. Perceptions of racially ambiguous faces can be impacted by racial labeling and the context in which the faces are presented (white-only vs. black-only environment). (Ito, Willadsen-Jensen, Kaye, & Park 2011).

=== Categorization ===
Categorization of individuals as a tool for evaluating them reduces an individual to being associated with the stereotypical representation of that group. Once stereotypical associations are made, this gives rise to individuals assessing the level of threat an individual exhibits if a threatening connotation is associated with the stereotype of that group. Research suggests that things are identified by comparing its traits to an association of similar items/processes stored in their memory. When categorizing and making connections of an individual to a stereotype equating their perception of threat to the degree to which that categorized individual aligns with the stereotype can lead to stereotype threat falling on the categorized person. Lasting effects of race category activation on judgment, evaluation, and behavior that can have serious outcomes, such as biases in criminal sentences. Individuals vary in the extent to which stereotypes are associated with social categories. Strength of stereotype association impacts stereotype effect. Categorization was thought to be inevitable, a result of the perception of others...however it is avoidable and its avoidance can hopefully reduce prejudice, reduce unjust threat perceptions, and counteract stereotype threat.

== Stereotypes ==
A stereotype can be defined as the association of a group with a trait (ex: Blacks being linked to dangerousness or criminality). In the United States individuals are more likely to encounter white people as the default race as opposed to Black individuals. In a White majority, perceptual systems may be more sensitive to, and also more biased toward Black features which can automatically activate stereotypes that link to threat perception. Event Related Potentials (ERPs) demonstrate attention is preferentially directed toward Black targets showing that there is a tendency to attend to potential threats, which black individuals have been stereotypically associated with. Descriptions of stereotypical Black behavior are more likely to be attributed to photographs of individuals who appear to be more Afrocentric.

The Quadruple Process Model involves a stimulus (ex: Black male) activating an association (ex: threat) in which the strength of the association (stereotype) prompts a behavior (ex: shoot response). To survive, evolutionarily, humans must be to reliably identify threats. The stimulus, association, stereotype, behavior system prompts the identification of a threat and initiates a response to the stimulus. Threat relevant associates are emotionally saturate and essential for survival. Not only can threat perception be influenced by emotionally salient factors, cultural stereotypes, and their strength combine to disadvantage blacks to be perceived as more threatening. Recent stereotypes suggest that Blacks, even when unarmed, may be perceived as threatening. Shooter bias is a tendency to shoot armed Blacks quicker and more frequently than armed Whites, but deciding not to shoot unarmed Whites quicker and more frequently than unarmed Blacks. Individuals with greater knowledge of this cultural stereotype or a predisposition to link Blacks to violence displayed more extreme shooter bias and especially biased threat perceptions that led to especially biased behavior.

There are two race effects that lead to Blacks being incorrectly shot at more than Whites:

Perceptual sensitivity: guns are less distinguishable when held by Blacks
Response bias: objects held by Blacks are more likely to be treated as guns.

After being tasked to shoot individuals who held guns, and not to shoot if they were carrying any other object, race should technically be irrelevant to the decision to shoot or not shoot because the correct response solely depends on the object being held. Even as a nondiagnostic component to the evaluation of one's perceived threat value race was still factored in to the overall judgment of threat perception. The only information the participants were obligated to attend to was the identification of a weapon or non-weapon. Racial cues promote biased behavior as well as false threat perception. Any cue that implies danger, not just race, may create a predisposition to shoot, however, race and the stereotype associated with it led to a higher evaluation of threat perception, which impacted biased responses.

Stereotypes have the potential to create associations with positive or negative aspects of the group it is generalizing. Research shows there is general negativity/prejudice toward Blacks leading highly prejudice individuals to link Blacks to negativity that is or is not relevant to the Black stereotype (ex: linking Blacks to words like poison or cancer). Black danger association and stereotypes predict that Black faces capture and hold attention faster and longer than white faces because threatening stimuli captures and holds attention faster and for longer intervals than neutral stimuli (in this case black faces). The perception of the level of threat posed by a black face significantly biases attention allocation due to an unjust stereotype leading to inaccurate threat perceptions. This also suggests that as fear-conditioned stimuli, individuals are taught to have a pre-established instinct to associate the threat perception of a black individual as more dangerous. Attention has been shown to be biased as a result of societal stereotypes of Blacks in association with danger stereotypes of Blacks in association with danger that leads Black faces to be seen as fear-conditioned stimuli. Stereotypes can be gatekeepers, they can be self-perpetuating by directing attention towards expected information or as an efficient information processing device that directs attention towards new information that may potentially undermine the stereotype and is dependent upon the individuals use of the stereotype. The individual use of the stereotype is also what unfairly moderates the perceived threat of blacks by way of conditioning longstanding stereotypes.

== Neuronal activity ==
With the increasing strength of a stereotype, cognitively the associations we have attached to that stereotype, such as a higher rated threat perception of blacks, will be analyzed with more ease. Because people are motivated to use as little cognitive resources as possible stereotypes and the connotations attached to them, such as threat perceptions of blacks, last as the most readily available and most easily comprehensible explanation. In a White majority, the perceptual system may be more sensitive to Black faces, and more biased as well. ERPs demonstrate that attention is preferentially directed toward black targets. Participants were more biased/prejudiced against prototypical Black targets than less prototypical Black targets shown through fMRI and being presented with more or less prototypical individuals. Non-prototypical individuals (ex: dark-skinned white males) caused greater amygdala activation (akin to fear response) than did light-skinned white males. The amygdala is associated with fear, threat and emotion processing.

Stereotypes and other expectations act as filters that increase the ease with which expectancy-consistent information can be processed. People are motivated to use as little cognitive resources as possible giving the most attention to the easiest comprehensible material (expectancy-consistent information). As stereotype strength increases, so should the ease of processing stereotype-consistent information. Attention will shift from stereotype-consistent information to stereotype-inconsistent information. Unexpected information is processed more extensively because it is more difficult to comprehend while consistent information can be coded as generic examples of the expectancy but inconsistent information must be uniquely coded as new information that is not aligned with expectancy.

== Environment/context ==
The environment or context through which information is received impacts the threat associated with it. For example, if a man is wearing a hoodie and walking rather fast towards you in the morning, in a rich neighborhood, on a crowded street, while it is raining, threat perception is lower than encountering that same individual after dark, in a poverty-stricken neighborhood with no rain on an empty street. Although this could have no threatening intentions at all, the context in which you encounter that person will dictate the level of threat associated with them. Ecological contamination hypothesis states: environment taints perceptions. Those who are in dangerous neighborhood seem more dangerous (ex: police use more force in poverty-stricken neighborhoods that have high crime rates and greater proportions of minorities). When the background appeared to be safe, racial bias was present (armed Blacks were shot quicker and more frequently than armed whites), vs. when the background was threatening, racial bias was reduced (demonstrated by a tendency to increase the rate at which White targets were shot increasing). Blacks were still treated hostilely in both dangerous and nondangerous contexts. Dangerous contexts proved to reduce racial bias in the decision to shoot in that Whites were treated in a similar, hostile fashion to Blacks, not that Blacks were treated with similar regard or restraint as Whites. There is an increasing racial bias from white people, racially ambiguous individuals, and Black faces. Racially ambiguous faces get more racial bias than white faces and less racial bias than black faces, acting as an intermediate, on average. In a white-only context, racially ambiguous individuals are viewed as more prototypically Black, whereas in a Black-only context, racially ambiguous individuals are viewed as less prototypically black. Perceptions of racially ambiguous faces can be impacted by direct-racial labeling and the context in which the faces are presented (White only vs Black only environments). Mixed contexts lead to a more mild bias than segregated situation.

Signal detection theory (SDT) involves a bias and reduces ability to distinguish tools from weapons after a Black prime even in situations when race was incidental (nondiagnostic). The only cue the participants were obligated to attend to was the presence of a weapon or non-weapon. However, unable to sever blacks from their stereotype and its related factors, unjust heightened threat perception persists.

== Strategies for change ==
The bias toward threat perception evaluation of black people, caused by stereotypes, can be lessened with access to diagnostic cues (ex: presence or absence of a weapon) and motivation. Lay people are more racially biased, on average, than trained police officers. Target prototypicality is shown to moderate racial bias. Police officers show a reduced racial bias in comparison to members of the community, however, police officers were no better than community members in their sensitivity to prototypic targets. Exposing people to stimuli where race is unrelated to the stereotype may eliminate racial bias. Initial responses were racially biased but research shows that extensive practice with race being unrelated to the task at hand worked to eliminate racial bias. As counter-stereotypical information is aggregated from multiple sources, it may force a change in the stereotype decreasing its strength or negating it entirely. Exposure to counter stereotypic stimuli can reduce racial bias, making race non-diagnostic and unhelpful for the decision process; the characteristic (violence) is unrelated to the group (race). Critical characteristics (weapon possession) is statistically unrelated to race therefore paying attention to race may hinder your judgment because it is non-diagnostic (unessential) to the task at hand. It may be beneficial to expose individuals to counter stereotypical information and stereotypic stimuli to change the nature of category-based responses. Racial bias appeared to be significantly reduced (for the parameters of the study) with training indicating that change can be made. A stereotype can be a gatekeeper, perpetuating itself by directing attention toward expected information, or as an efficient information-processing device that facilitates the extraction of novel information with the potential to undermine itself.

== See also ==
- Social perception
- Implicit stereotype
- Killing of Trayvon Martin
