= Mount Begbie =

Mountain in British Columbia, Canada

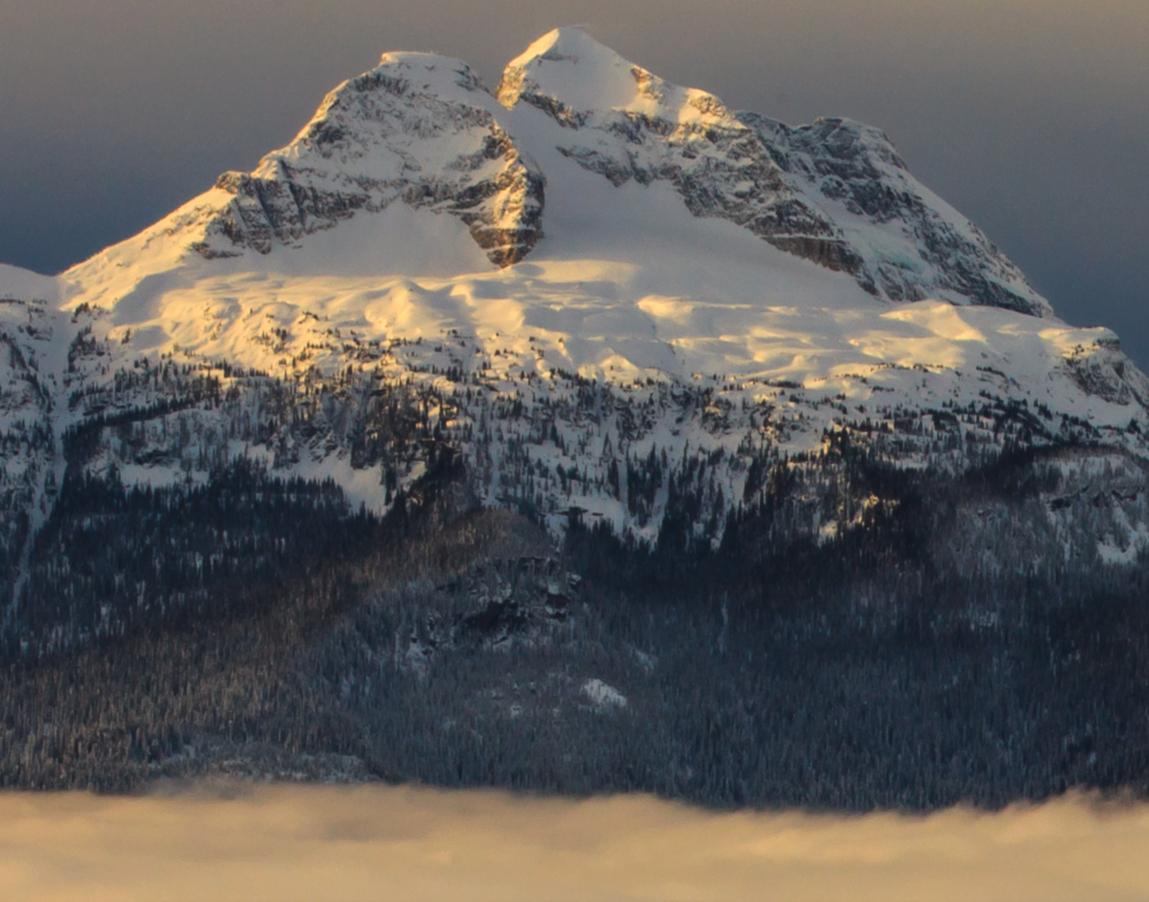
- Mount Begbie

Highest point
- Elevation: 2,733 m (8,967 ft)
- Prominence: 883 m (2,897 ft)
- Parent peak: Blanket Mountain (2,809 m)
- Listing: Mountains of British Columbia
- Coordinates: 50°53′05″N 118°15′21″W

Naming
- Etymology: Matthew Baillie Begbie

Geography
- Location within British Columbia Location within Canada
- Interactive map of Mount Begbie
- Location: British Columbia, Canada
- District: Kootenay Land District
- Parent range: Monashee Mountains
- Topo map: NTS 82L16 Revelstoke

Climbing
- First ascent: 1907 Haggen, Herdman, Robertson, E. Feuz Jr.
- Easiest route: glacier and scrambling

Mount Begbie is a 2,733-metre (8,967-foot) mountain summit located in the Gold Range of the Monashee Mountains in British Columbia, Canada. Situated west of the Columbia River high above the shore of Upper Arrow Lake, this prominent peak is visible from the Trans-Canada Highway, Revelstoke, and Revelstoke Mountain Resort ski area. Mt. Begbie Brewing Company, a brewery, was named after the mountain. The nearest peak is Mount Tilley, 3 km (1.9 mi) to the west, and the nearest higher peak is Blanket Mountain, 14.0 km (8.7 mi) to the south.

== History ==
Mount Begbie is named for Sir Matthew Baillie Begbie (1819–1894), a prominent judge in the British Columbia colony. The first ascent of the mountain was accomplished June 11, 1907, by James Robert Robertson, J. Herdman, and Rupert W. Haggen, with Edward Feuz Jr. as guide. The mountain's name was officially adopted in 1932 when approved by the Geographical Names Board of Canada, although this toponym had appeared in publications as early as 1887, if not earlier.

== Climate ==
Based on the Köppen climate classification, Mount Begbie is located in a subarctic climate zone with cold, snowy winters, and mild summers. Winter temperatures can drop below −20 °C with wind chill factors reaching temperatures below −30 °C. Despite the modest elevation, the climate supports a glacier in the north cirque. Most precipitation runoff from Mount Begbie drains east into tributaries of the Columbia River; however, a portion drains west into the Eagle River, a tributary of the Fraser River.

== Geology ==
Mount Begbie is part of the Monashee complex located in the southern part of the Omineca Belt of the Canadian Cordillera (Okulitch 1984, Wheeler & McFeely 1991). The Monashee complex is the lowest structural unit of the Shuswap Metamorphic Complex and exposes rock of ancestral North America (Canadian shield). Both the core and the cover sequence of the Thor-Odin culmination have experienced considerable deformation, high-grade metamorphism, late Paleocene-early Eocene anatexis, and Eocene brittle faulting (Johnston et al. 2000, Kruse & Williams 2005, Hinchey et al. 2006). Mt. Begibe is composed dominantly of quartzite and meta-sedimentary gneiss/schist.

== Gallery ==
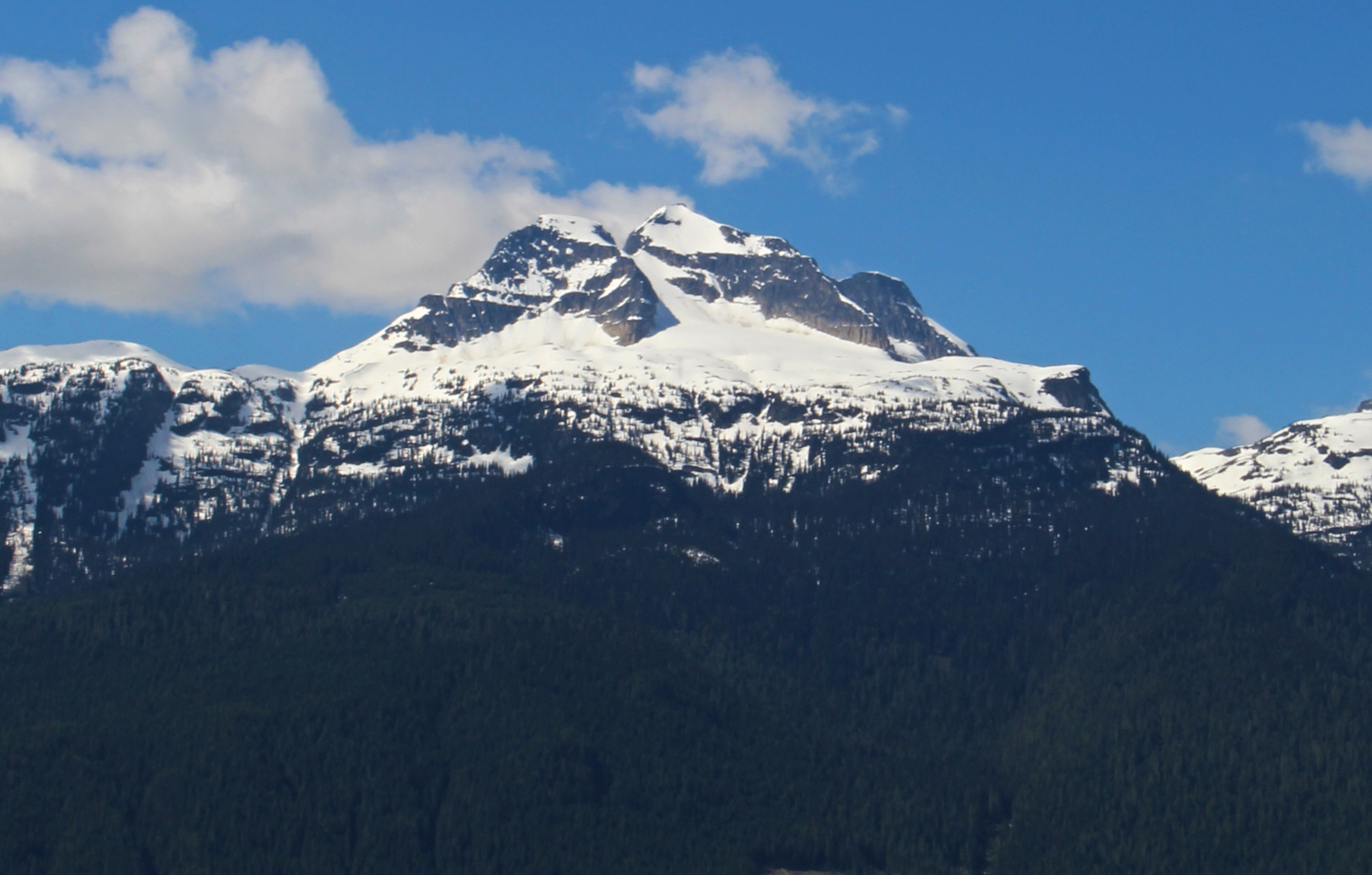
North aspect

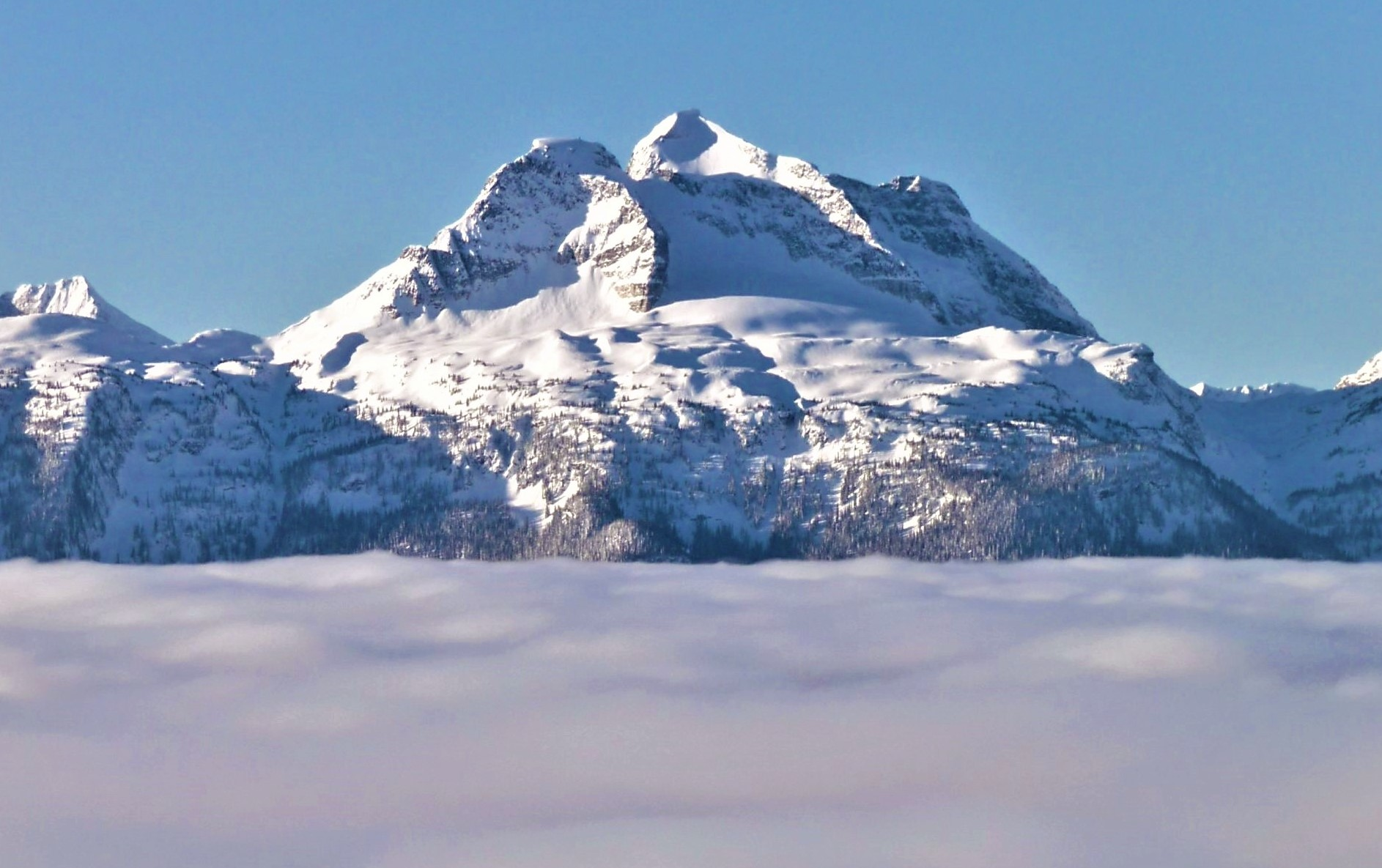

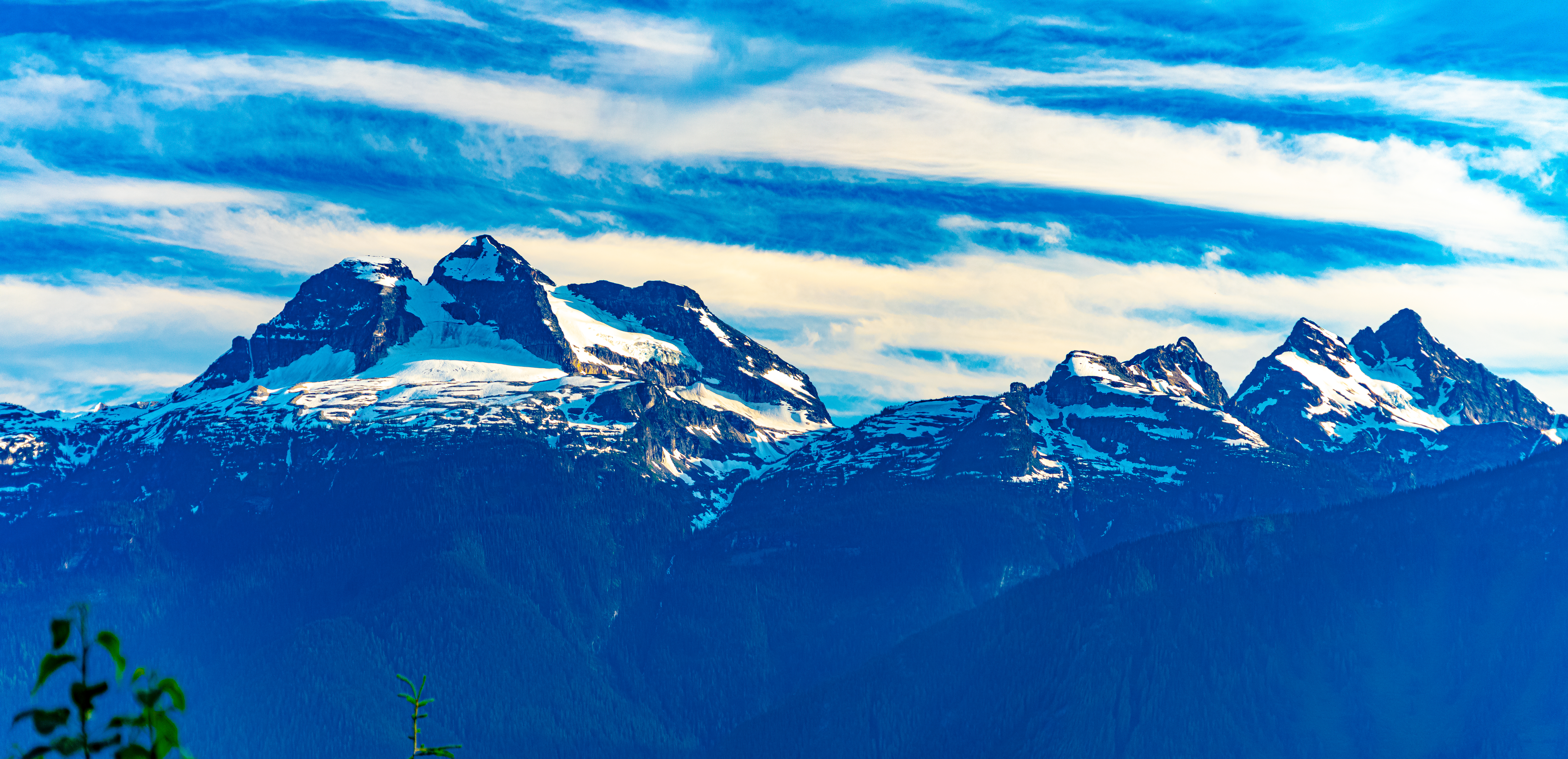
Mt. Begbie (left) and Mt. Tilley (right)

== See also ==
- Geology of British Columbia
- Geography of British Columbia
