= Wheeler (surname) =

Wheeler is a surname of English origin. It is an occupational name, originally describing one who makes or uses wheels.

== People ==
- Aaron Wheeler (born 1998), American basketball player in the Israeli Basketball Premier League
- Allen Wheeler (1903-1984), British airplane officer and pilot
- Albert H. Wheeler (1915–1994), American academic and politician
- A. Harry Wheeler (1873–1950), American mathematician, inventor, and mathematics teacher
- Alison Wheeler (born 1972), British singer
- Alison Wheeler (comedian) (born 1986), French comedian and actress
- Alwynne Cooper Wheeler (1929–2005), British ichthyologist
- Andrew R. Wheeler (born 1986), American lawyer
- Anna Wheeler (author) (1780–1848), Anglo-Irish author
- Anna Wheeler (mathematician) (1883–1966), American mathematician
- Anne Wheeler (born 1946), Canadian film and television writer and director
- Benjamin Ide Wheeler (1854–1927), American academic
- Bert Wheeler (1895–1968), American comedian
- Bessie Wheeler (1876–?), American painter
- Billy Edd Wheeler (1932–2024), American songwriter, performer, writer and visual artist
- Blake Wheeler (born 1986), American ice hockey player
- Brian Wheeler (1961/62–2024), American radio announcer
- Burton K. Wheeler (1882–1975), American politician
- Candace Wheeler (1827–1923), American interior and textile designer
- Caron Wheeler (born 1963), English R&B singer
- Charles Wheeler (disambiguation), several people
- Cheryl Wheeler (born 1951), American singer-songwriter
- Chris Wheeler (born 1945), American announcer and color commentator
- Clare Wheeler (born 1998), Australian footballer
- Clayton L. Wheeler (1876–1950), New York politician
- Cora Stuart Wheeler (1852–1897), American poet, author
- Craig Michael Wheeler, American politician
- Damen Wheeler (born 1977), American football player
- Dan Wheeler (born 1977), American baseball pitcher
- Daniel Wheeler (1771-1840), British Quaker missionary and agriculturist
- Daniel Wheeler (born 1987), American professional wrestler
- David Wheeler (disambiguation), several people
- Deborah Wheeler (1945–2025), American politician
- Donald Niven Wheeler (1913–2002), American academic and bureaucrat, accused spy, brother of George Shaw Wheeler
- Donald J. Wheeler, American statistician and author
- Earle Wheeler (1908–1975), American general
- Edwin Wheeler (1828–1864), American legislator and jurist
- Elisabeth Wheeler (born 1944), American biologist, botanist and wood scientist
- Ella Wheeler Wilcox (1850–1919), American poet
- Ellen Wheeler (born 1961), American actress
- Erica Wheeler (disambiguation), several people
- Everett P. Wheeler (1840–1925), American politician
- Felix Wheeler, British functionary, the Crown Equerry
- Flex Wheeler (born 1965), American professional bodybuilder
- Floyd E. Wheeler (1905–1995), American politician
- Frederick Wheeler (public servant) (1914–1994), Australian public servant
- Gary Wheeler (disambiguation), several people
- Geoffrey Wheeler (disambiguation), several people
- George Shaw Wheeler (1908–1998), American economist, defector, brother of Donald Niven Wheeler
- Golden "Big" Wheeler (1929–1998), American blues singer, harmonicist and songwriter
- Harold Wheeler (disambiguation), several people
- Harry Wheeler (disambiguation), several people
- Heneage Wheeler (1870–1965), English cricketer
- Homer W. Wheeler (1848–1930), American military officer and author
- Hugh Wheeler (1912–1987), English writer
- Humpy Wheeler (Howard Augustine Wheeler, 1938–2025), American auto racing promoter and track owner
- Ian Wheeler (born 1949), New Zealand cricketer
- Ian Wheeler (American football) (born 2001), American football player
- J. Wheeler (Middlesex cricketer) (dates unknown), an 18th-century English professional cricketer
- Jacquetta Wheeler (born 1981), British model
- James Wheeler (disambiguation), several people
- Jason Wheeler (born 1990), American baseball player
- Jillian Wheeler (born 1991), American actress and singer
- John Wheeler (disambiguation), several people
- John Wheeler-Bennett (1902–1975), British historian
- Johnny Wheeler (1928–2019), footballer for Tranmere Rovers, Bolton Wanderers, Liverpool, New Brighton
- Jordan Wheeler (1964), Cree-Canadian writer
- Joseph Wheeler (disambiguation), several people
- Josh Wheeler (wheelchair rugby) (born 1980), American wheelchair rugby player
- Kenny Wheeler (1930–2014), Canadian composer
- Kristiina Wheeler (born 1983), Finnish singer and television hostess
- Lillian Wheeler (1880–1905), Australian actress
- Lloyd Garrison Wheeler (1848–1909), American businessman and philanthropist
- Louis Cutter Wheeler (1910–1980), American botanist
- Lucile Wheeler (born 1935), Canadian alpine skier
- Maggie Wheeler (born 1961), American actress
- Marcy Wheeler, American independent journalist
- Mary Sparkes Wheeler (1835–1919), British-born American author, poet, lecturer
- Matthew Wheeler (born 1962), English cricketer
- Maureen Wheeler, co-founder of Lonely Planet Publications
- Michael Wheeler (disambiguation), multiple people
- Mavis Wheeler (1908–1970), English socialite and artist's model
- Mortimer Wheeler (1890–1976), British archaeologist
- Nathaniel Wheeler (1820–1893), American businessman
- Nick Wheeler (born 1965), British businessman
- Nick Wheeler (born 1982), American rock musician
- Nicola Wheeler (born 1974), English actress
- Neil Wheeler (1917–2009), Royal Air Force officer
- Osmer B. Wheeler (1809–1906), New York politician
- Paul Wheeler (disambiguation), several people
- Peter Wheeler (disambiguation), several people
- Philip Wheeler (born 1984), American football player
- Quentin Wheeler (born 1955), American Olympic hurdler
- Quentin D. Wheeler (born 1954), American entomologist
- Raymond Albert Wheeler, (1885–1974) American general and engineer
- Raymond Leslie Wheeler (1927–2019), British engineer
- René Wheeler (1912-2000), French screenwriter and film director
- Robert Wheeler (disambiguation), including Bob and Bobby Wheeler
- Roger Wheeler (disambiguation), several people
- Roy Wheeler (disambiguation), several people
- Ryan Wheeler (born 1988), American baseball player
- Ryan Wheeler (baseball coach) (born 1971), American college baseball coach
- Schuyler Wheeler (1860–1923), American engineer, inventor of the electric fan
- Seager Wheeler (1868–1961), Canadian agronomist, pioneered economically viable wheat strains and fruit for dryland prairie farming
- Shannon Wheeler, American cartoonist
- Stuart Wheeler (1935–2020), British businessman and politician
- Tessa Wheeler, British archaeologist
- Thomas Wheeler (disambiguation), several people
- Tim Wheeler (disambiguation), several people
- Tony Wheeler, co-founder of Lonely Planet Publications
- Wayne Wheeler (1869–1927), American temperance activist
- William Wheeler (disambiguation), several people
- Wilson Roy Wheeler (1905–1988), Australian postman and ornithologist
- Zack Wheeler (born 1990), American baseball player
- Zelous Wheeler (born 1987), American baseball player and coach

== Fictional characters ==
- Joey Wheeler, from the Japanese anime Yu-Gi-Oh!
- Megan Wheeler, from the American TV series Law & Order: Criminal Intent
- Mike Wheeler, from the American TV series Stranger Things
- Nancy Wheeler, from the American TV series Stranger Things
- April and Frank Wheeler, from the book Revolutionary Road and its movie adaptation Revolutionary Road
- Jake Wheeler, from the American TV series Chucky
- Vert Wheeler, name given to two characters from Hot Wheels series: one from Hot Wheels World Race and Hot Wheels: AcceleRacers, and one from Hot Wheels: Battle Force 5 respectively
- Barry Wheeler, from the video game Alan Wake

== See also ==
- Justice Wheeler (disambiguation)
- Wheeler (given name)
- Wheeler (disambiguation)
- Wheler
