= List of places in California (T) =

List of places in California - T

This list of current:

- cities
- towns, unincorporated communities
- counties, and other recognized places in the U.S. state of California.

Information on the number and names of counties in which the place lies, and its lower and upper ZIP Code bounds, if applicable are also included.

Name of place	Number of counties	Principal county	Lower zip code	Upper zip code
Table Bluff Rancheria	1	Humboldt County		
Table Mountain Rancheria	1	Fresno County		
Taft	1	Kern County	93268	
Taft Heights	1	Kern County	93268	
Taft Mosswood	1	San Joaquin County		
Tagus	1	Tulare County	93274	
Tagus Ranch	1	Tulare County		
Tahoe City	1	Placer County	96145	
Tahoe Keys	1	El Dorado County	95705	
Tahoe Paradise	1	El Dorado County	96155	
Tahoe Pines	1	Placer County	96141	
Tahoe Valley	1	El Dorado County	96158	
Tahoe Vista	1	Placer County	96148	
Tahoma	2	El Dorado County; Placer County	95733	
Tajiguas	1	Santa Barbara County		
Talbert	1	Orange County		
Talica	1	San Diego County	92054	
Tallac Village	1	El Dorado County		
Tall Timber Camp	1	Tuolumne County		
Talmage	1	Mendocino County	95481	
Talus	1	Inyo County		
Tamal	1	Marin County	94964	
Tamalpais-Homestead Valley	1	Marin County		
Tamalpais Valley	1	Marin County	94941	
Tamalpais Valley Junction	1	Marin County		
Tamarack	1	Calaveras County	95223	
Tambs Station	1	Tuolumne County	95370	
Tancred	1	Yolo County		
Tanforan	1	San Mateo County	94080	
Tangair	1	Santa Barbara County	93437	
Tanglewood	1	Santa Cruz County	95018	
Tan Oak Park	1	Mendocino County		
Tara Hills	1	Contra Costa County	94806	
Tara Hills-Montalvin Manor	1	Contra Costa County		
Tarke	1	Sutter County		
Tarpey	1	Fresno County	93727	
Tarpey Village	1	Fresno County		
Tarzana	1	Los Angeles County	91356	
Tassajara	1	Contra Costa County		
Tassajara Hot Springs	1	Monterey County	93924	
Tatu	1	Mendocino County		
Taurusa	1	Tulare County	93291	
Taylor	1	Riverside County		
Taylor Junction	1	Los Angeles County		
Taylorsville	1	Plumas County	95983	
Teal	1	Solano County		
Tecate	1	San Diego County	91980	
Tecnor	1	Siskiyou County	96066	
Tecopa	1	Inyo County	92389	
Tecopa Hot Springs	1	Inyo County	92389	
Tecopa-Shoshone	1	Inyo County		
Teekay	1	San Joaquin County		
Tehachapi	1	Kern County	93561	
Tehama	1	Tehama County	96090	
Telegraph City	1	Calaveras County		
Temecula	1	Riverside County	92589	93
Temelec	1	Sonoma County		
Temescal	1	Alameda County	94609	
Temescal Valley	1	Riverside County	92883	
Temple City	1	Los Angeles County	91780	
Templeton	1	San Luis Obispo County	93465	
Tennant	1	Siskiyou County	96066	
Tent City	1	San Diego County	92118	
Terminal Annex	1	Los Angeles County	90054	
Terminal Island	1	Los Angeles County	90731	
Terminal Island Coast Guard Base	1	Los Angeles County	90731	
Terminous	1	San Joaquin County	95240	
Terminous Junction	1	San Joaquin County		
Terminus	1	Tulare County		
Termo	1	Lassen County	96132	
Terra Bella	1	Tulare County	93270	
Terra Cotta	1	Riverside County		
Terra Linda	1	Marin County	94903	
Terra Linda	1	Marin County	94903	
Terra Loma	1	San Mateo County	94015	
Tewksbury Heights	1	Contra Costa County	94805	
Textile	1	Los Angeles County	90015	
The Cedars	1	Placer County	95728	
The Forks	1	Mendocino County	95482	
The Geysers	1	Sonoma County	95425	
The Grove	1	Merced County		
The Homestead	1	San Joaquin County		
Thenard	1	Los Angeles County		
The Oaks	1	Los Angeles County		
The Oaks	1	Mendocino County		
The Oaks	1	Nevada County	95945	
The Plaza	1	San Bernardino County		
Thermal	1	Riverside County	92274	
Thermalito	1	Butte County	95965	
The Sea Ranch	1	Sonoma County	95497	
The Willows	1	San Diego County		
The Willows	1	Santa Cruz County		
Thoman	1	Napa County		
Thomas Lane	1	Kern County		
Thomas Mountain	1	Riverside County	92361	
Thomasson	1	Solano County		
Thompson	1	Napa County		
Thorn	1	Humboldt County		
Thorn	1	San Bernardino County		
Thorn Junction	1	Humboldt County		
Thornton	1	San Joaquin County	95686	
Thousand Oaks	1	Ventura County	91319	62
Thousand Palms	1	Riverside County	92276	
Three Arch Bay	1	Orange County	92677	
Three Points	1	Los Angeles County	93532	
Three Rivers	1	Tulare County	93271	
Three Rocks	1	Fresno County	93608	
Thyle	1	San Luis Obispo County		
Tiber	1	San Luis Obispo County		
Tiburon	1	Marin County	94920	
Tierra Buena	1	Sutter County	95991	
Tierra del Sol	1	San Diego County	92005	
Tiger Lily	1	El Dorado County		
Timba	1	Stanislaus County		
Timber Lodge	1	Mariposa County	95345	
Timbuctoo	1	Yuba County		
Tionesta	1	Modoc County	96134	
Tipton	1	Tulare County	93272	
Tisdale	1	Sutter County		
Titus	1	San Diego County		
Tivy Valley	1	Fresno County	93657	
Toadtown	1	Butte County		
Tobin	1	Plumas County	95980	
Tocaloma	1	Marin County	94950	
Todd	1	Sonoma County		
Todd Valley	1	Placer County	95631	
Todos Santos	1	Contra Costa County	94522	
Tokay	1	Tulare County		
Tolenas	1	Solano County	94533	
Tollhouse	1	Fresno County	93667	
Toluca Lake	1	Los Angeles County	91602	
Tomales	1	Marin County	94971	
Toms Place	1	Mono County	93514	
Tomspur	1	San Joaquin County		
Tonyville	1	Tulare County	93247	
Toolville	1	Tulare County	93221	
Toomey	1	San Bernardino County		
Topanga	1	Los Angeles County	90290	
Topanga Beach	1	Los Angeles County	90265	
Topanga Oaks	1	Los Angeles County	90290	
Topanga Park	1	Los Angeles County	90290	
Topa Topa	1	Ventura County	93060	
Topaz	1	Mono County	96133	
Top of the World	1	Orange County	92651	
Tormey	1	Contra Costa County	94525	
Toro Canyon	1	Santa Barbara County		
Torrance	1	Los Angeles County	90501	99
Torrance Annex	1	Los Angeles County		
Torres-Martinez Indian Reservation	2	Imperial County; Riverside County	92263	
Torrey Pines Homes	1	San Diego County	92037	
Tower	1	Fresno County	93728	
Towle	1	Placer County		
Town And Country	1	Sacramento County	95821	
Town and Country Trailer Park	1	Riverside County	92388	
Town Center	1	Tulare County	93291	
Town Talk	1	Nevada County	95959	
Toyon	1	Calaveras County		
Toyon	1	Shasta County	96001	
Trabuco	1	Orange County	92679	
Trabuco Canyon	1	Orange County	92678	
Trabuco Highlands	1	Orange County		
Trabuco Oaks	1	Orange County		
Tracy	1	San Joaquin County	95376	
Trancas	1	Los Angeles County		
Tranquillity	1	Fresno County	93668	
Traver	1	Tulare County	93673	
Travis Air Force Base	1	Solano County	94535	
Treasure Island	1	San Francisco County	94130	
Treasure Island Naval Support Activity	1	San Francisco County	94130	
Tremont	1	Solano County		
Trent	1	Merced County		
Trenton	1	Sonoma County	95401	
Tres Pinos	1	San Benito County	95075	
Trevarno	1	Alameda County	94550	
Triangle	1	San Joaquin County		
Tri-city	1	Orange County		
Trigo	1	Madera County	93637	
Trimmer	1	Fresno County	93657	
Trinidad	1	Humboldt County	95570	
Trinidad Rancheria	1	Humboldt County	95570	
Trinity Alps	1	Trinity County	96052	
Trinity Center	1	Trinity County	96091	
Trinity Village	1	Trinity County		
Triple R Estates	1	Tulare County	93257	
Trocha	1	Tulare County		
Trona	1	San Bernardino County	93562	
Tropico	1	Los Angeles County	91204	
Tropico Village	1	Kern County	93560	
Trowbridge	1	Sutter County	95659	
Troy	1	Placer County		
Truckee	1	Nevada County	96161	
Trull	1	San Joaquin County		
Tudor	1	Sutter County		
Tujunga	1	Los Angeles County	91042	
Tulare	1	Tulare County	93274	
Tulare East	1	Tulare County	93274	
Tulare Northwest	1	Tulare County	93274	
Tulelake	1	Siskiyou County	96134	
Tule Lake	1	Siskiyou County		
Tule River Indian Reservation	1	Tulare County	93257	
Tunitas	1	San Mateo County	94109	
Tunnel	1	Los Angeles County		
Tunnel Inn	1	Shasta County		
Tuolumne	1	Tuolumne County	95379	
Tuolumne City	1	Tuolumne County		
Tuolumne Meadows	1	Tuolumne County	95389	
Tuolumne Rancheria	1	Tuolumne County	95379	
Tupman	1	Kern County	93276	
Turk	1	Fresno County	93210	
Turlock	1	Stanislaus County	95380	
Turner	1	San Joaquin County		
Turner	1	Sonoma County		
Turner Station	1	San Joaquin County	95336	
Tustin	1	Orange County	92780	82
Tustin Foothills	1	Orange County	92780	
Tustin Marine Corps Air Station	1	Orange County	92710	
Tuttle	1	Merced County	95340	
Tuttletown	1	Tuolumne County	95370	
Tuxedo Country Club Estates	1	San Joaquin County	95204	
Tuxedo Park	1	San Joaquin County	95204	
T.V. Bell	1	Merced County	95340	
Twain	1	Plumas County	95984	
Twain Harte	1	Tuolumne County	95383	
Tweedy	1	Los Angeles County	90280	
Twentynine Palms	1	San Bernardino County	92277	
Twenty-Nine Palms Indian Reservation	1	San Bernardino County	92258	
Twentynine Palms Marine Corps Base	1	San Bernardino County	92277	78
Twin Bridges	1	El Dorado County	95735	
Twin Buttes	1	Tulare County		
Twin Cities	1	Sacramento County	95632	
Twin Creeks	1	Santa Clara County		
Twin Lakes	1	Kern County		
Twin Lakes	1	Los Angeles County		
Twin Lakes	1	Santa Cruz County	95062	
Twin Oaks	1	Kern County		
Twin Oaks	1	San Diego County	92069	
Twin Peaks	1	San Bernardino County	92391	
Twin Pines	1	Placer County		
Two Harbors	1	Los Angeles County		
Two Rock	1	Sonoma County		
Two Rock Coast Guard Station	1	Sonoma County	94952	
Two Rock Ranch Station	1	Sonoma County	94952	
Tyee City	1	Humboldt County		
Tylers Corner	1	El Dorado County		
Tyrone	1	Sonoma County		
