= Wheeler =

Wheeler may refer to:

== Places ==
=== United States ===
- Wheeler, Alabama, an unincorporated community
- Wheeler, Arkansas, an unincorporated community
- Wheeler, California, an unincorporated community
- Wheeler, Illinois, a village
- Wheeler, Indiana, a census-designated place
- Wheeler, Mississippi, an unincorporated community
- Wheeler, Nebraska, a ghost town
- Wheeler, New York, a town
- Wheeler, Oregon (disambiguation)
- Wheeler, Texas, a city
- Wheeler, Virginia, an unincorporated community
- Wheeler, Washington, a census-designated place
- Wheeler, West Virginia, an unincorporated community
- Wheeler, Wisconsin, a village
- Wheeler County (disambiguation)
- Wheeler Crest or Ridge, a ridge in Mono and Inyo Counties, California
- Wheeler Dam, Alabama
  - Wheeler Lake, the lake created by the dam
- Wheeler Geologic Area, a protected area of Mineral County, Colorado
- Wheeler Island, Connecticut
- Wheeler Islands (West Virginia)
- Wheeler National Wildlife Refuge, near Decatur, Alabama
- Wheeler Peak (disambiguation)
- Wheeler Township (disambiguation)

=== Elsewhere ===
- Cape Wheeler, Palmer Land, Antarctica
- Wheeler Valley, Victoria Land, Antarctica
- Wheeler Island (Queensland), Australia
- Wheelers Bay, on the south-east coast of the Isle of Wight, England
- Wheeler Street, Cambridge, England
- Wheeler Glacier, a glacier in South Georgia and the South Sandwich Islands, British overseas territory
- Abdul Kalam Island, India, formerly Wheeler Island
- 31555 Wheeler, an asteroid

== People ==
- Wheeler (surname)
- Wheeler (given name)

== Military uses ==
- Wheeler Army Airfield, Honolulu, Hawaii, U.S.
- Camp Wheeler, a former U.S. Army base near Macon, Georgia
- Operation Wheeler/Wallowa, an American offensive during the Vietnam War
- A nuclear device detonated in 1957 in Nevada, U.S., as part of Operation Plumbbob

== Schools ==
- Wheeler School, Providence, Rhode Island, U.S.
- Wheeler High School (disambiguation), at least five schools in the U.S.

== Transportation ==
- Wheeler Airport, a private airport in Starke County, Indiana, United States
- Wheeler station, a train station in Houston, Texas, United States

== Other uses ==
- Wheeler Bank, Manitou Springs, Colorado, United States
- Wheeler Block (disambiguation)
- Wheeler Centre, a literary and publishing centre in Melbourne, Australia
- Wheeler Opera House, Aspen, Colorado, United States
- Wheeler Hall, on the campus of the University of California, Berkeley
- Wheeler baronets, a title in the Baronetage of the United Kingdom
- Wheelers (novel), a 2000 novel by Ian Stewart and Jack Cohen
- Wheelers, the men with wheels in Ozma of Oz by L. Frank Baum
- Dublin Wheelers, a cycling club based in Dublin, Ireland
- An alternative term for a wheelwright, used especially in the British Army
- Wheeler Field (Virginia Beach), a proposed baseball park in Virginia Beach, Virginia, United States
- A. H. Wheeler, an Indian bookstore chain

== See also ==
- Wheeler House (disambiguation)
- Wheeler-Kenyon method, a method of archaeological excavation
