= Charles B. Wheeler =

Charles B. Wheeler may refer to:

- Charles Barker Wheeler (1851–1935), American jurist who served as justice of New York Supreme Court
- Charles Brewster Wheeler (1865–1946), American general who served in three wars
- Charles Bertan Wheeler (1926–2022), American politician from Missouri, a/k/a Charles B. Wheeler Jr.

== See also ==
- Charles B. Wheeler Downtown Airport, American facility named after Kansas City mayor Charles Bertan Wheeler
- Charles Wheeler (disambiguation)
