= Trigo =

Trigo may refer to:

- Trigo (horse)
- Trigo (company)
- Trigo, Madera County, California
- The ruler of the fictional Trigan Empire
- Trigonometry
- América del Pilar Rodrigo Trigo, Argentinian botanist
- María Cristina Trigo (1935–2014), Bolivian writer and activist
- "Trigo", a song by Ana Moura from Casa Guilhermina
