= The Oaks, California =

The Oaks, California may refer to:

- The Oaks (Monrovia, California), an 1885 Queen Anne Style house
- The Oaks (Thousand Oaks, California), a shopping mall
- The Oaks, Los Angeles County, California, a place in California
- The Oaks, Mendocino County, California, an unincorporated community
- The Oaks, Nevada County, California, an unincorporated community
