= Mignery Sculpture Garden =

Coordinates: 41.8843°N 98.5525°W

The Mignery Sculpture Garden is a sculpture garden in Bartlett, Nebraska. The 39 statues on the grounds of the Wheeler County Courthouse were designed by Herb Mignery, and the structure is "one of the largest displays of bronze statues" in the United States.
