= Thomas Wheeler =

Thomas Wheeler may refer to:

- Thomas Wheeler (MP) (died 1574), Member of Parliament (MP) for Ludlow
- Thomas Wheeler (soldier) (1620–1676), American colonial soldier and writer
- Thomas J. Wheeler (1803–1875), American physician and New York state senator
- Thomas Martin Wheeler (1811–1862), British radical activist and insurance society manager
- Tom Wheeler (born 1946), American FCC Chairman
- Thomas C. Wheeler (born 1948), American federal judge
- Tom Wheeler (writer), American television writer and producer
- Norman Wheeler (Thomas Norman Wheeler, 1915–1990), British army officer

== See also ==
- Wheeler (surname)
