= Newboro, Nebraska =

Defunct town in America

Newboro is a ghost town in Wheeler County, Nebraska, United States.

== History ==
A post office was established at Newboro in 1896, and remained in operation until it was discontinued in 1935.
