= Trevarno =

Trevarno may refer to:

- Trevarno, Cornwall, estate near Helston in Cornwall, UK
- Trevarno, Livermore, California, neighborhood
