= Town Topics =

Town Topics may refer to:

- Town Topics (magazine), a defunct New York publication
- Town Topics (musical), a theatrical work by Harry B. Smith
- Town Topics (newspaper), a newspaper in Princeton, New Jersey

== See also ==
- Town Talk (disambiguation)
