= Wheeler Peak =

Wheeler Peak may refer to the following United States summits:

- Wheeler Peak, California, in the Sweetwater Mountains
- Wheeler Peak (Mono County, California), on the Wheeler Crest
- Wheeler Peak (Nevada) - highest summit of the Snake Range
- Wheeler Peak (New Mexico) - highest summit of the Taos Mountains and in the State of New Mexico
- Wheeler Ridge, a Kern County peak west of the town of Wheeler Ridge, California

== Others ==
- Mount Wheeler, 365 m peak in Queensland, Australia
