= Wheeler High School =

Wheeler High School may refer to:

- Wheeler High School (Connecticut) — North Stonington, Connecticut
- Wheeler High School (Indiana) — Valparaiso, Indiana
- Wheeler High School (Fossil, Oregon)
- Wheeler Central High School — Bartlett, Nebraska
- Wheeler High School (Georgia) — Marietta, Georgia
- Wheeler High School (Mississippi) — Booneville, Mississippi
- Wheeler High School (Texas) — Wheeler, Texas

== See also ==
- Wheeler School
