= Wheeler (given name) =

Wheeler is the given name of:

People:

- Wheeler R. Baker (born 1946), American politician
- Wheeler Peckham Bloodgood (1871–1930), American lawyer
- Wheeler H. Bristol (1818–1904), American engineer, railroad executive and politician
- Wheeler Winston Dixon (born 1950), American writer of film history, theory and criticism, and professor
- Wheeler Dryden (1892–1957), English actor and film director, half brother of Charlie Chaplin
- Wheeler Martin (1765–1836), justice of the Rhode Island Supreme Court
- Wheeler Milmoe (1898–1972), New York politician
- Wheeler J. North (1922–2002), American marine biologist and environmental scientist
- Wheeler Oakman (1890–1949), American film actor
- Wheeler Hazard Peckham (1833–1905), American lawyer
- Wheeler Thackston (born 1944), American orientalist
- Wheeler Williams (1897–1972), American sculptor

Fictional characters:

- Wheeler, one of the five Planeteers from the animated TV series Captain Planet and the Planeteers
- Wheeler, an alien in the 1968 science fiction novel The Goblin Reservation by Clifford Simak
- Wheeler, an alien in the 1998 science fiction novel Signal to Noise by Eric Nylund

== See also ==
- Wheeler (surname)
- Wheeler (disambiguation)
