= Diane Gilbert Sypolt =

American judge (born 1947)

Diane Gilbert

Senior Judge of the United States Court of Federal Claims
- In office January 31, 2005 – September 1, 2005

Judge of the United States Court of Federal Claims
- In office October 17, 1990 – January 31, 2005
- Appointed by: George H. W. Bush
- Preceded by: Randall Ray Rader
- Succeeded by: Thomas C. Wheeler

Personal details
- Born: Diane Gilbert; June 14, 1947 (age 78); Rochester, New York, U.S.
- Spouse(s): Allen Weinstein (div. 1990) Dwight Sypolt (m. 1995)
- Education: Smith College (BA); Boston University (JD)

Diane Gilbert Sypolt (born June 14, 1947), formerly Diane Gilbert Weinstein, is a former judge of the United States Court of Federal Claims from 1990 to 2005.

== Early life, education, and career ==
Born in Rochester, New York to Myron B. and Doris (Robie) Gilbert, Sypolt received a Bachelor of Arts in Spanish and medieval comparative literature from Smith College in 1969, and was a visiting student at Stanford University Law School and Georgetown University Law Center, before receiving a Juris Doctor from Boston University School of Law in 1979. Sypolt served as a law clerk to the Hon. Catherine B. Kelly of the District of Columbia Court of Appeals from 1979 to 1980, and was then in private practice in Washington, D.C. from 1980 to 1983, as an associate with the firm of Peabody, Lambert and Meyers.

=== Government service ===
Sypolt was assistant general counsel to the Office of Management and Budget, Executive Office of the President from 1983 to 1986, and was deputy general counsel to the U.S. Department of Education from 1986 to 1989, serving as acting general counsel in 1988 and 1989. She then served as counselor to the vice president of the United States, Dan Quayle, from 1989 to 1990. She also served on the President's Competitiveness Council from 1989 to 1990.

=== Claims court service ===
On July 31, 1990, Sypolt was nominated by President George H. W. Bush to a seat on the U.S. Claims Court (later U.S. Court of Federal Claims) vacated by the elevation of Randall Ray Rader to the Federal Circuit. Sypolt was confirmed by the Senate on October 12, 1990, and received her commission on October 17, 1990, entering on duty October 22, 1990. She assumed senior status on January 31, 2005 and retired from the bench on September 1, 2005.

== Personal life ==
Sypolt was married to history professor Allen Weinstein until 1990. She and Weinstein had two sons, Andrew and David. In October 1995, Sypolt married Dwight D. Sypolt, although she continued to serve under the name Diane Gilbert Weinstein.

Legal offices
Preceded by Randall Ray Rader	Judge of the United States Court of Federal Claims; 1990–2005	Succeeded by Thomas C. Wheeler
