= Town Talk =

Town Talk may refer to:

- The Town Talk (established 1883), a newspaper in Alexandria, Louisiana
- Town Talk, California, an unincorporated community in Nevada County, California
- Town Talk (TV series), an Australian TV series aired in Sydney in 1957
- "Town Talk", a 1966 song by Ken Woodman and his Picadilly Brass, used as the theme for multiple British radio shows
