= Justice Wheeler =

Justice Wheeler may refer to:

- Christine Wheeler (born 1954), justice of the Supreme Court of Western Australia
- George W. Wheeler (1860–1932), chief justice of the Supreme Court of Connecticut
- Hoyt Henry Wheeler (1833–1906), associate justice of the Vermont Supreme Court
- Royall T. Wheeler (1810–1864), chief justice of the Supreme Court of Texas
- Stephen Morse Wheeler (1900–1967), associate justice of the New Hampshire Supreme Court

== See also ==
- Thomas C. Wheeler (born 1948), judge of the United States Court of Federal Claims
