= Wheeler Township =

Wheeler Township may refer to the following places:

- Wheeler Township, Van Buren County, Arkansas
- Wheeler Township, Washington County, Arkansas
- Wheeler Township, Lyon County, Iowa
- Wheeler Township, Sac County, Iowa
- Wheeler Township, Gratiot County, Michigan
- Wheeler Township, Lake of the Woods County, Minnesota

== See also ==
- Wheeler (disambiguation)
