= Cumminsville, Nebraska =

Unincorporated community in Nebraska, United States

- Unincorporated Community
- Location within Nebraska Location within the United States
- Coordinates: 41°59′13″N 98°32′54″W
- Country: United States
- State: Nebraska
- County: Wheeler
- Elevation: 2,070 ft (630 m)
- GNIS feature ID: 828520

Cumminsville is an unincorporated community in Wheeler County, Nebraska, United States.

== History ==
Cumminsville was established in 1881 as the first town in Wheeler County. It was named for pioneer homesteader Frank Cummins, and was located in the Beaver Valley in anticipation of the building of a Union Pacific Railroad line from Albion through the valley.

During its first year, Cumminsville grew to include two general stores, a livery barn, a blacksmith shop, a hotel and a church, plus residences. A post office was opened in 1881 with merchant Sam Chambers as postmaster, and remained in operation until 1937. A newspaper, "The Wheeler County Gazette" was also started that year by A. J. Stewart and became the county's official newspaper.
