= Ericson, Nebraska =

Village in Wheeler County, Nebraska, United States

- Village
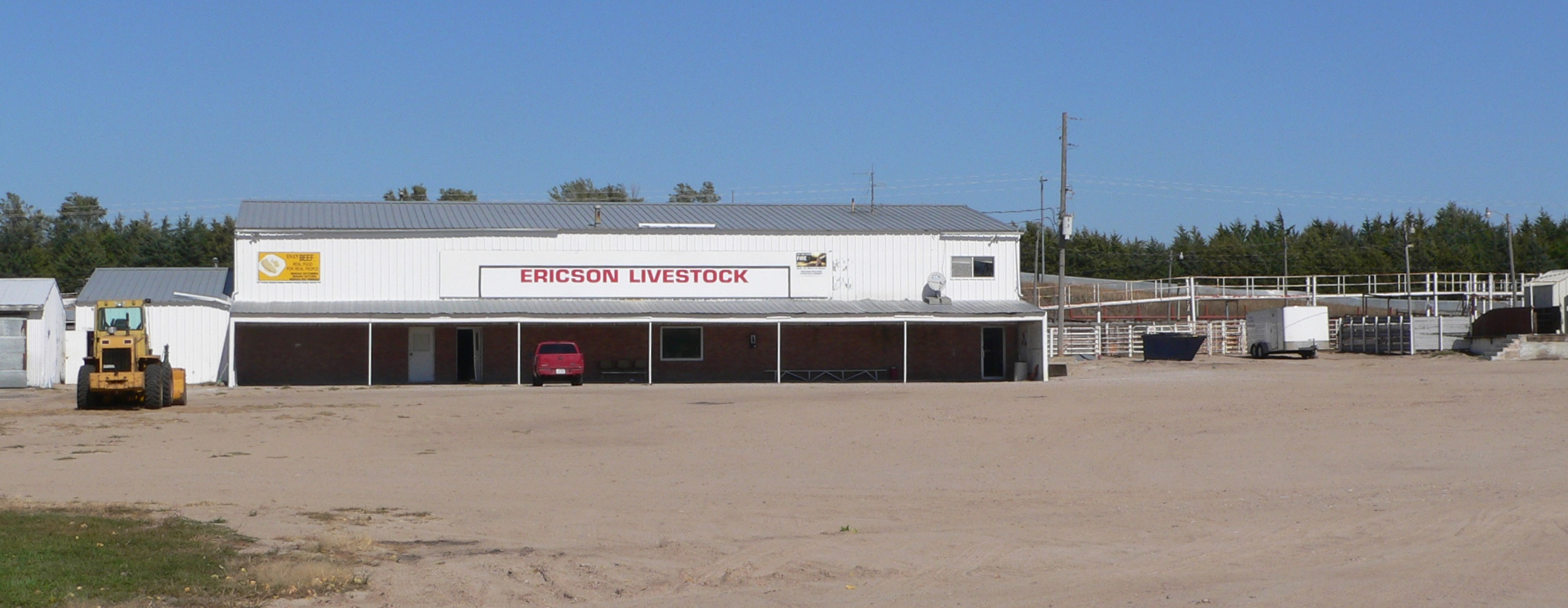
- Ericson-Spalding Livestock Market in Ericson

- Location of Ericson, Nebraska
- Coordinates: 41°46′50″N 98°40′43″W
- Country: United States
- State: Nebraska
- County: Wheeler

Area
  - Total: 0.37 sq mi (0.97 km^{2})
  - Land: 0.37 sq mi (0.97 km^{2})
  - Water: 0 sq mi (0.00 km^{2})
- Elevation: 2,028 ft (618 m)

Population (2020)
  - Total: 89
  - Density: 238/sq mi (91.7/km^{2})
- Time zone: UTC-6 (Central (CST))
  - Summer (DST): UTC-5 (CDT)
- ZIP code: 68637
- Area code: 308
- FIPS code: 31-16025
- GNIS feature ID: 2398839

Ericson is a village in Wheeler County, Nebraska, United States. As of the 2020 census, Ericson had a population of 89.

== History ==
Ericson was platted in 1886 by the C. B. & Q. railroad when the railroad's line to Greeley was extended to that location. It was named for Christensen Erickson, the original owner of the town site. The town grew slowly, and the first depot agent, named Dahl, also bought grain, sold coal, and took over the store being run by Peter Erickson, to keep the town viable.

== Geography ==
According to the United States Census Bureau, the village has a total area of 0.38 square miles (0.98 km^{2}), all land.

=== Climate ===
According to the Köppen Climate Classification system, Ericson has a hot-summer humid continental climate, abbreviated "Dfa" on climate maps. The hottest temperature recorded in Ericson was 111 °F (43.9 °C) on July 26, 2012, while the coldest temperature recorded was −35 °F (−37.2 °C) on February 15–16, 2021.

Climate data for Ericson, Nebraska, 1991–2020 normals, extremes 1984–present
Month	Jan	Feb	Mar	Apr	May	Jun	Jul	Aug	Sep	Oct	Nov	Dec	Year
Record high °F (°C)	71 (22)	79 (26)	89 (32)	91 (33)	100 (38)	106 (41)	111 (44)	106 (41)	101 (38)	98 (37)	85 (29)	73 (23)	111 (44)
Mean maximum °F (°C)	59.3 (15.2)	63.7 (17.6)	75.9 (24.4)	83.6 (28.7)	89.2 (31.8)	93.6 (34.2)	98.1 (36.7)	96.4 (35.8)	91.8 (33.2)	85.1 (29.5)	73.8 (23.2)	61.0 (16.1)	99.6 (37.6)
Mean daily maximum °F (°C)	34.3 (1.3)	37.7 (3.2)	49.3 (9.6)	59.2 (15.1)	69.4 (20.8)	79.9 (26.6)	85.7 (29.8)	83.6 (28.7)	76.4 (24.7)	63.1 (17.3)	48.7 (9.3)	37.0 (2.8)	60.4 (15.8)
Daily mean °F (°C)	22.6 (−5.2)	26.0 (−3.3)	36.3 (2.4)	46.3 (7.9)	57.1 (13.9)	67.8 (19.9)	73.3 (22.9)	71.2 (21.8)	62.7 (17.1)	49.1 (9.5)	35.8 (2.1)	25.7 (−3.5)	47.8 (8.8)
Mean daily minimum °F (°C)	11.0 (−11.7)	14.2 (−9.9)	23.3 (−4.8)	33.4 (0.8)	44.8 (7.1)	55.7 (13.2)	60.9 (16.1)	58.8 (14.9)	49.1 (9.5)	35.2 (1.8)	23.0 (−5.0)	14.4 (−9.8)	35.3 (1.9)
Mean minimum °F (°C)	−11.6 (−24.2)	−6.0 (−21.1)	3.6 (−15.8)	17.5 (−8.1)	29.9 (−1.2)	42.7 (5.9)	50.1 (10.1)	46.5 (8.1)	34.2 (1.2)	19.2 (−7.1)	5.4 (−14.8)	−6.2 (−21.2)	−16.7 (−27.1)
Record low °F (°C)	−34 (−37)	−35 (−37)	−18 (−28)	0 (−18)	21 (−6)	32 (0)	40 (4)	37 (3)	25 (−4)	6 (−14)	−14 (−26)	−32 (−36)	−35 (−37)
Average precipitation inches (mm)	0.52 (13)	0.65 (17)	1.48 (38)	2.73 (69)	3.97 (101)	4.17 (106)	3.59 (91)	3.22 (82)	2.37 (60)	2.15 (55)	1.01 (26)	0.69 (18)	26.55 (676)
Average snowfall inches (cm)	4.8 (12)	6.2 (16)	3.7 (9.4)	3.0 (7.6)	0.0 (0.0)	0.0 (0.0)	0.0 (0.0)	0.0 (0.0)	0.0 (0.0)	1.3 (3.3)	4.2 (11)	4.5 (11)	27.7 (70.3)
Average extreme snow depth inches (cm)	5.2 (13)	5.7 (14)	4.0 (10)	2.0 (5.1)	0.2 (0.51)	0.0 (0.0)	0.0 (0.0)	0.0 (0.0)	0.0 (0.0)	.09 (0.23)	2.6 (6.6)	3.4 (8.6)	10.0 (25)
Average precipitation days (≥ 0.01 in)	3.7	3.9	6.2	8.6	11.1	9.8	8.9	8.1	6.2	6.4	3.9	3.6	80.4
Average snowy days (≥ 0.1 in)	2.1	2.9	1.8	1.0	0.0	0.0	0.0	0.0	0.0	0.4	1.4	2.1	11.7
Source 1: NOAA
Source 2: National Weather Service

== Demographics ==
Historical population
Census	Pop.	Note	%±
1920	192		—
1930	272		41.7%
1940	279		2.6%
1950	186		−33.3%
1960	157		−15.6%
1970	122		−22.3%
1980	132		8.2%
1990	111		−15.9%
2000	104		−6.3%
2010	92		−11.5%
2020	89		−3.3%
U.S. Decennial Census

=== 2010 census ===
As of the census of 2010, there were 92 people, 51 households, and 29 families residing in the village. The population density was 242.1 inhabitants per square mile (93.5/km^{2}). There were 72 housing units at an average density of 189.5 per square mile (73.2/km^{2}). The racial makeup of the village was 100.0% White.

There were 51 households, of which 13.7% had children under the age of 18 living with them, 54.9% were married couples living together, 2.0% had a male householder with no wife present, and 43.1% were non-families. 39.2% of all households were made up of individuals, and 27.4% had someone living alone who was 65 years of age or older. The average household size was 1.80 and the average family size was 2.34.

The median age in the village was 62 years. 12% of residents were under the age of 18; 0.0% were between the ages of 18 and 24; 12% were from 25 to 44; 33.7% were from 45 to 64; and 42.4% were 65 years of age or older. The gender makeup of the village was 50.0% male and 50.0% female.

=== 2000 census ===
As of the census of 2000, there were 104 people, 57 households, and 29 families residing in the village. The population density was 279.5 inhabitants per square mile (107.9/km^{2}). There were 69 housing units at an average density of 185.4 per square mile (71.6/km^{2}). The racial makeup of the village was 100.00% White.

There were 57 households, out of which 19.3% had children under the age of 18 living with them, 43.9% were married couples living together, 5.3% had a female householder with no husband present, and 49.1% were non-families. 49.1% of all households were made up of individuals, and 28.1% had someone living alone who was 65 years of age or older. The average household size was 1.82 and the average family size was 2.55.

In the village, the population was spread out, with 19.2% under the age of 18, 1.0% from 18 to 24, 17.3% from 25 to 44, 36.5% from 45 to 64, and 26.0% who were 65 years of age or older. The median age was 54 years. For every 100 females, there were 89.1 males. For every 100 females age 18 and over, there were 78.7 males.

As of 2000 the median income for a household in the village was $25,278, and the median income for a family was $35,500. Males had a median income of $19,583 versus $21,250 for females. The per capita income for the village was $15,506. There were no families and 11.4% of the population living below the poverty line, including no under eighteens and 28.1% of those over 64.

== See also ==
- List of municipalities in Nebraska
