= Gary Wheeler =

Gary Wheeler may refer to:

- Gary Wheeler (rugby league) (born 1989), English rugby league player
- Gary Wheeler (filmmaker), American film producer
- Gary Wheeler (politician) (1938–2010), mayor of Moncton, 1974–1979

== See also ==
- Wheeler (surname)
