= Zachary Somers =

American judge (born 1979)

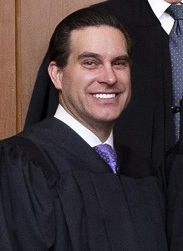
- Somers in 2022

Judge of the United States Court of Federal Claims
- Incumbent
- Assumed office December 22, 2020
- Appointed by: Donald Trump
- Preceded by: Thomas C. Wheeler

Personal details
- Born: Zachary Noah Somers; 1979 (age 45–46) Washington, D.C., U.S.
- Party: Republican
- Education: Georgetown University (BA, JD)

Zachary Noah Somers (born 1979) is an American lawyer who serves as a judge of the United States Court of Federal Claims.

== Education ==
Somers earned a Bachelor of Arts, cum laude, from Georgetown University, and a Juris Doctor from the Georgetown University Law Center, where he served as the editor-in-chief of the Georgetown Journal of Law & Public Policy.

== Career ==
Upon graduation from law school, Somers served as a law clerk to Judge Victor J. Wolski of the United States Court of Federal Claims. He was an attorney at the boutique Washington, D.C., law firm Marzulla Law, LLC, where he specialized in takings and breach of contract litigation before the Court of Federal Claims and other federal courts. He served over a decade on the United States House Committee on the Judiciary staff in several counsel roles, including as the Committee's General Counsel and Parliamentarian. Before becoming a judge, he served as the Chief Investigative Counsel for the United States Senate Committee on the Judiciary, where he handled oversight and investigations for Chairman Lindsey Graham.

=== Claims court service ===
On August 26, 2020, President Donald Trump announced his intent to nominate Somers to serve as a judge of the United States Court of Federal Claims. On September 8, 2020, his nomination was sent to the Senate. President Trump nominated Somers to the seat vacated by Judge Thomas C. Wheeler, who retired on October 23, 2020. On November 18, 2020, a hearing on his nomination was held before the Senate Judiciary Committee. On December 10, 2020, his nomination was reported out of committee by a 13–9 vote. On December 17, 2020, the United States Senate invoked cloture on his nomination by a 52–42 vote. His nomination was confirmed later that day by a 52–43 vote. He received his judicial commission on December 22, 2020, and was sworn in on December 23, 2020.

Legal offices
Preceded by Thomas C. Wheeler	Judge of the United States Court of Federal Claims; 2020–present	Incumbent
