= Robert Wheeler =

Robert (or Bob, Bobby, or Rob) Wheeler may refer to:

== People ==
- Sir Mortimer Wheeler (Robert Eric Mortimer Wheeler, 1890–1976), archaeologist
- Robert E. Wheeler, United States Air Force general
- Robert L. Wheeler (1920–1992), American racehorse trainer
- Robert Wheeler (chess player), see Jamaican Chess Championship
- Robert Wheeler, electoral candidate of Future New Zealand party for the New Zealand general election, 1999
- Bob Wheeler (1952–2010), American middle-distance runner
- Rob Wheeler, New Zealand evangelist of New Life Churches, New Zealand
- Rob Wheeler, former radio presenter of Heart South Devon, radio station in United Kingdom
- Rob Wheeler, country music artist, songwriter, producer at Bucks Music Group

== Fictional ==
- Bob Wheeler, fictional character of Night Court, portrayed by Brent Spiner
- Bob Wheeler, fictional character of Bob Hearts Abishola, portrayed by Billy Gardell
- Bob Wheeler, pseudonymous name of fictional Passions character Martin Fitzgerald
- Bobby Wheeler (Taxi), fictional character, portrayed by Jeff Conaway
- Bobby Wheeler, fictional character of Clarence, portrayed by Robert Agnew
- Rob Wheeler, a fictional character in the science fiction novel Macrolife

== See also ==
- Robert Wheler, English local historian
- Bert Wheeler (1895–1968), star of the Wheeler & Woolsey team in American comedy films
