= Joseph Wheeler (disambiguation) =

Joseph Wheeler (1836–1906) was a Confederate States Army general.

Joseph or Joe Wheeler may also refer to:

- Joseph Wheeler (pirate) (fl. 1696–1698), pirate active in the Indian Ocean and Red Sea
- Joseph Wheeler (musicologist) (1927–1977), British musician and musicologist
- Joseph Wheeler (shipbuilder), 19th-century Irish shipbuilder
- Joseph Wheeler (sculpture), a bronze sculpture by Berthold Nebel
- Joseph Mazzini Wheeler (1850–1898), English atheist and freethought writer
- Joseph L. Wheeler (1884–1970), American librarian
- Joe Wheeler (baseball) (1898–?), American baseball player
- Joe Wheeler (rugby union) (born 1987), New Zealand rugby union player
- Katsuya Jonouchi, a.k.a. Joey Wheeler

== See also ==
- Joseph Wheeler High School, Georgia, U.S.
- Joe Wheeler State Park, Alabama
