= Roy Wheeler =

Roy Wheeler may refer to:

- Roy Wheeler (politician) (1909–1971), Australian politician
- Wilson Roy Wheeler (1905–1988), known as W. Roy Wheeler, Australian ornithologist
- H. Roy Wheeler (1904–1978), mayor of Linden, New Jersey
