= Timba, California =

Unincorporated community in California, United States

Timba (Yokuts: Orestimba, meaning "meeting place") is a small unincorporated town in Stanislaus County, California, United States, approximately one mile (1.6 km) north of Newman. Timba is located at 37°20′34″N 121°01′52″W.

== History ==
The original location of Orestimba, meaning meeting place in Yokuts, was the meeting place for Mission padres and local Yokuts Indians. Later Orestimba was moved east for the railroad. The name changed from Orestimba to Timba. Orestimba was formed in 1854 as John M. Newsome was the first township supervisor appointed by the judges of the newly formed Stanislaus County, which was formed out of Tuolumne County, California in the same year.

== Orestimba Landmark ==
The Orestimba Landmark is 6 miles (9.7 km) west of Timba on the original location in the Diablo Range. 37°18.052′N 121°6.238′W
