= David Wheeler =

David Wheeler may refer to:

- David H. Wheeler (1829–1902), American academic, newspaperman and college president; US ambassador to Italy
- David P. Wheeler (1876–1904), United States Army captain
- David Wheeler (computer scientist) (1927–2004), British computer scientist
- David Wheeler (gardener and writer) (born 1945), British gardener, writer and journalist
- David Wheeler (footballer) (born 1990), English footballer
- David Wheeler (stage director) (c. 1925–2012), American director of theatre and film
- David Wheeler (Alabama politician) (c. 1949–March 9, 2022), member of the Alabama House of Representatives
- David Wheeler (South Dakota politician) (born 1979), member of the South Dakota Senate
- David Thewlis (David Wheeler, born 1963), English actor and writer
