= Wheeler County, Nebraska =

County in Nebraska, United States

- County
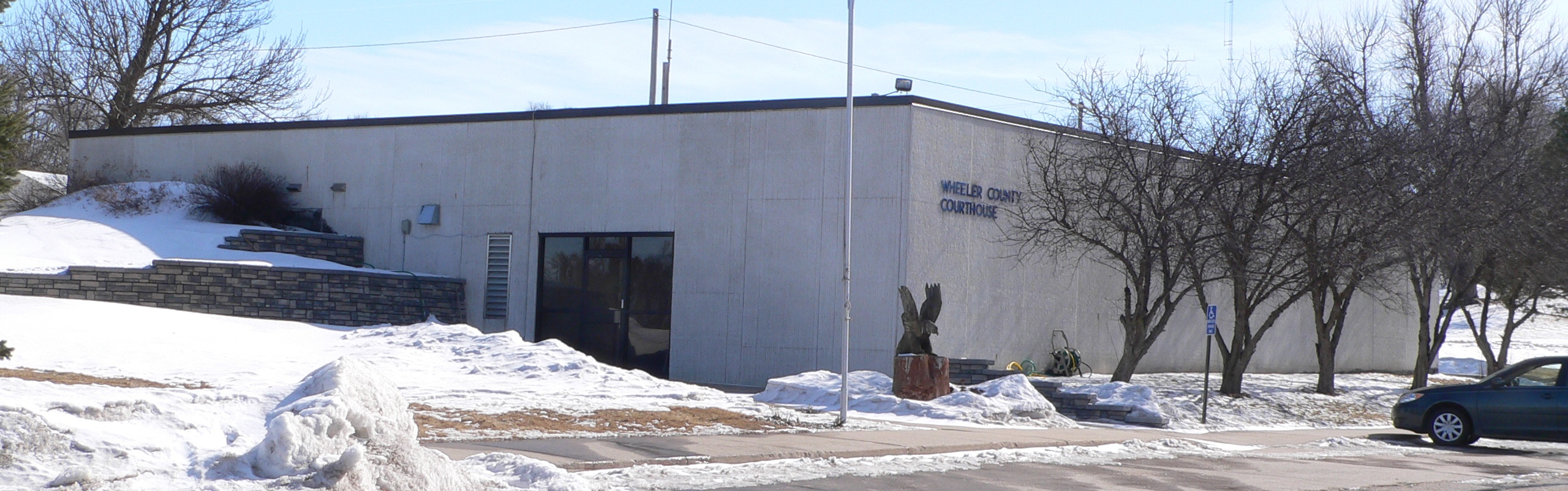
- The Wheeler County Courthouse in Bartlett

- Location within the U.S. state of Nebraska
- Coordinates: 41.922575°N 98.520853°W
- Country: United States
- State: Nebraska
- Created: February 17, 1877
- Organized: April 11, 1881
- Named for: Daniel H. Wheeler
- Seat: Bartlett
- Largest village: Bartlett

Area
  - Total: 575.592 sq mi (1,490.78 km^{2})
  - Land: 575.183 sq mi (1,489.72 km^{2})
  - Water: 0.409 sq mi (1.06 km^{2}) 0.07%

Population (2020)
  - Total: 774
  - Estimate (2025): 789 ▲
  - Density: 1.35/sq mi (0.520/km^{2})
- Time zone: UTC−6 (Central)
  - Summer (DST): UTC−5 (CDT)
- Area code: 308
- Congressional district: 3rd
- Website: wheelercounty.ne.gov
- • Nebraska county number 92 • Nebraska license plate prefix 84

Wheeler County is a county in the U.S. state of Nebraska. As of the 2020 census, the population was 774, and was estimated to be 789 in 2025. The county seat and the largest village is Bartlett.

In the Nebraska license plate system, Wheeler County was represented by the prefix "84" (as it had the 84th-largest number of vehicles registered in the state when the license plate system was established in 1922).

== History ==
Wheeler County was created on February 17, 1877 and organized on April 11, 1881, The county was named for Major Daniel H. Wheeler, longtime secretary of the Nebraska State Board of Agriculture.

Following the establishment and rapid growth of the town of Cumminsville, in anticipation of a Union Pacific Railroad line through that town. Cedar City (now disbanded) was the site of the first seat of government for the county, which covered an area of 48 miles west to east and 25 miles north to south. On November 25, 1884, this area was halved, with the western portion becoming Garfield County, leaving the remainder as Wheeler County with its present boundaries.

The county's government was overseen by three commissioners, two from two districts in the more heavily populated southern half of the county, the third from the North. In 1885, the government was deemed to be outgrowing its small courthouse in Cedar City and two men, Cumminsville school superintendent Begelow and Ezra Bartlett Mitchell offered land options outside of Cedar City to build a new courthouse. In a heated election, Mitchell's site was chosen over Begelow's by a vote of 193 to 90, and the new courthouse led to the establishment of a surrounding town, named Bartlett (Mitchell's middle name), to serve as the seat of government. Cedar City collapsed shortly after the government offices there were abandoned.

In 1886, a spur line of the C.B.& Q. railroad was built into the county, ending at a point where the town of Ericson was established.

In 1895, while attempting to construct a ditchway to irrigate farmland between Ericson and Spalding, a dam was built across Clear Creek. Though the ditch construction was ultimately not successful, the dam created present-day Pibel Lake.

Wheeler County's population began to wane after the turn of the 20th century, but in 1904, with the enactment of the Kinkaid Act, a new round of settlers reinvigorated the population.

== Geography ==
According to the United States Census Bureau, the county has a total area of 575.592 square miles (1,490.78 km^{2}), of which 575.183 square miles (1,489.72 km^{2}) is land and 0.409 square miles (1.06 km^{2}) (0.07%) is water. It is the 47th-largest county in Nebraska by total area.

The terrain of Wheeler County consists of low rolling hills, sloping to the east. A local drainage, Beaver Creek, flows to the SE and east through the upper part of the county, exiting near the midpoint of the county's east boundary line.

=== Major highways ===
- U.S. Highway 281
- Nebraska Highway 70
- Nebraska Highway 91

=== Adjacent counties ===
- Antelope County – northeast
- Boone County – southeast
- Greeley County – south
- Valley County – southwest
- Garfield County – west
- Holt County – north

=== Protected areas ===
- Pibel Lake State Recreation Area

== Demographics ==
Historical population
Census	Pop.	Note	%±
1880	644		—
1890	1,683		161.3%
1900	1,362		−19.1%
1910	2,292		68.3%
1920	2,531		10.4%
1930	2,335		−7.7%
1940	2,170		−7.1%
1950	1,526		−29.7%
1960	1,297		−15.0%
1970	1,051		−19.0%
1980	1,060		0.9%
1990	948		−10.6%
2000	886		−6.5%
2010	818		−7.7%
2020	774		−5.4%
2025 (est.)	789	▲	1.9%
U.S. Decennial Census; 1790–1960 1900–1990; 1990–2000 2010–2020

=== 2020 census ===
As of the 2020 census, the county had a population of 774. The median age was 49.5 years. 21.4% of residents were under the age of 18 and 25.6% of residents were 65 years of age or older. For every 100 females there were 110.9 males, and for every 100 females age 18 and over there were 106.1 males age 18 and over.

The racial makeup of the county was 95.7% White, 0.0% Black or African American, 0.4% American Indian and Alaska Native, 0.0% Asian, 0.0% Native Hawaiian and Pacific Islander, 0.1% from some other race, and 3.7% from two or more races. Hispanic or Latino residents of any race comprised 2.6% of the population.

0.0% of residents lived in urban areas, while 100.0% lived in rural areas.

There were 343 households in the county, of which 25.4% had children under the age of 18 living with them and 16.0% had a female householder with no spouse or partner present. About 28.2% of all households were made up of individuals and 12.3% had someone living alone who was 65 years of age or older.

There were 503 housing units, of which 31.8% were vacant. Among occupied housing units, 73.2% were owner-occupied and 26.8% were renter-occupied. The homeowner vacancy rate was 1.9% and the rental vacancy rate was 3.2%.

=== 2000 census ===
As of the 2000 census, there were 886 people, 352 households, and 243 families in the county. The population density was 1.5 people per square mile (0.58 people/km^{2}). There were 561 housing units at an average density of 1 units per square mile (0.39/km^{2}). The racial makeup of the county was 99.10% White, 0.23% Native American, 0.56% from other races, and 0.11% from two or more races. 0.56% of the population were Hispanic or Latino of any race. 47.4% were of German, 9.4% Irish, 7.8% English, 7.2% Swedish and 7.0% American ancestry.

There were 352 households, out of which 31.80% had children under the age of 18 living with them, 62.80% were married couples living together, 3.10% had a female householder with no husband present, and 30.70% were non-families. 29.00% of all households were made up of individuals, and 14.80% had someone living alone who was 65 years of age or older. The average household size was 2.52 and the average family size was 3.10.

The county population contained 29.10% under the age of 18, 6.40% from 18 to 24, 21.90% from 25 to 44, 25.70% from 45 to 64, and 16.80% who were 65 years of age or older. The median age was 40 years. For every 100 females there were 96.00 males. For every 100 females age 18 and over, there were 100.00 males.

The median income for a household in the county was $26,771, and the median income for a family was $33,750. Males had a median income of $21,563 versus $17,083 for females. The per capita income for the county was $14,355. About 15.40% of families and 20.90% of the population were below the poverty line, including 27.80% of those under age 18 and 16.70% of those age 65 or over.

== Communities ==
=== Villages ===
- Bartlett (county seat)
- Ericson

=== Former communities ===
- Cumminsville
- Cedar City
- Wheeler

== Politics ==
Wheeler County voters have been reliably Republican for decades. In no national election since 1948 has the county selected the Democratic Party candidate (as of 2024).

United States presidential election results for Wheeler County, Nebraska
Year	Republican		Democratic		Third party(ies)	
Year	No.	%	No.	%	No.	%
1900	138	42.86%	180	55.90%	4	1.24%
1904	187	52.97%	56	15.86%	110	31.16%
1908	236	45.65%	252	48.74%	29	5.61%
1912	70	14.49%	194	40.17%	219	45.34%
1916	163	33.00%	270	54.66%	61	12.35%
1920	352	57.52%	165	26.96%	95	15.52%
1924	205	27.01%	145	19.10%	409	53.89%
1928	534	64.18%	293	35.22%	5	0.60%
1932	219	24.17%	658	72.63%	29	3.20%
1936	358	38.91%	484	52.61%	78	8.48%
1940	495	53.69%	427	46.31%	0	0.00%
1944	392	55.84%	310	44.16%	0	0.00%
1948	264	44.67%	327	55.33%	0	0.00%
1952	455	66.33%	231	33.67%	0	0.00%
1956	391	64.20%	218	35.80%	0	0.00%
1960	424	63.95%	239	36.05%	0	0.00%
1964	317	56.11%	248	43.89%	0	0.00%
1968	323	64.21%	131	26.04%	49	9.74%
1972	361	81.12%	84	18.88%	0	0.00%
1976	274	62.84%	146	33.49%	16	3.67%
1980	374	74.65%	93	18.56%	34	6.79%
1984	365	78.49%	97	20.86%	3	0.65%
1988	309	67.91%	141	30.99%	5	1.10%
1992	246	53.02%	88	18.97%	130	28.02%
1996	241	57.66%	106	25.36%	71	16.99%
2000	351	77.48%	85	18.76%	17	3.75%
2004	366	80.79%	81	17.88%	6	1.32%
2008	334	75.91%	96	21.82%	10	2.27%
2012	345	77.01%	93	20.76%	10	2.23%
2016	377	81.08%	62	13.33%	26	5.59%
2020	438	87.08%	59	11.73%	6	1.19%
2024	424	87.24%	57	11.73%	5	1.03%

== See also ==
- National Register of Historic Places listings in Wheeler County, Nebraska
