= Roger Wheeler =

Roger Wheeler may refer to:

- Roger Wheeler (British Army officer) (born 1941), British general and Chief of the General Staff, 1997–2000
- Roger Wheeler (businessman) (1926–1981), American businessman and murder victim
