= Wheeler, Nebraska =

- Unincorporated Community
- Location within Nebraska
- Coordinates: 41.99°N 98.63°W
- Country: United States
- State: Nebraska
- County: Wheeler

Wheeler is a ghost town in Wheeler County, Nebraska, United States.

== History ==
Wheeler was originally called Baird, but when it was discovered that another place called Baird already existed, the town was renamed to avoid repetition.

A post office was established at Wheeler in 1881, and remained in operation until it was discontinued in 1934.
