= Taft Heights, California =

Taft Heights
- census-designated place
- Location in Kern County and the state of California

- Location in the United States
- Coordinates: 35°08′05″N 119°28′21″W
- Country: United States
- State: California
- County: Kern

Government
  - Senate: Shannon Grove (R)
  - Assembly: Stan Ellis (R)
  - U. S. Congress: Vince Fong (R)

Area
  - Total: 0.296 sq mi (0.766 km^{2})
  - Land: 0.296 sq mi (0.766 km^{2})
  - Water: 0 sq mi (0 km^{2}) 0%
- Elevation: 1,178 ft (359 m)

Population (2020)
  - Total: 1,999
  - Density: 6,760/sq mi (2,610/km^{2})
- Time zone: UTC-8 (PST)
  - Summer (DST): UTC-7 (PDT)
- ZIP code: 93268
- Area code: 661
- FIPS code: 06-77588
- GNIS feature ID: 1661544

Taft Heights (formerly, Boust City) is a census-designated place (CDP) in Kern County, California, United States. Taft Heights is located 1 mile (1.6 km) west-southwest of Taft, at an elevation of 1,178 feet (359 m). The population was 1,999 at the 2020 census, up from 1,949 at the 2010 census.

== Geography ==
Taft Heights is located at 35°08′05″N 119°28′21″W.

According to the United States Census Bureau, the CDP has a total area of 0.3 square miles (0.78 km^{2}), all land.

== History ==
The place was originally called Boust City in honor of E.J. Boust, an oilman who founded the town.

== Demographics ==
Historical population
Census	Pop.	Note	%±
1950	2,176		—
1960	2,661		22.3%
1970	2,108		−20.8%
1980	2,111		0.1%
1990	2,050		−2.9%
2000	1,865		−9.0%
2010	1,949		4.5%
2020	1,999		2.6%
U.S. Decennial Census; 1860–1870 1880-1890; 1900 1910 1920; 1930 1940 1950; 1960 1970 1980; 1990 2000 2010; 2020

Taft Heights first appeared as an unincorporated place in the 1950 U.S. census; and as a census designated place in the 1980 United States census.

=== Racial and ethnic composition ===
Taft Heights CDP, California – Racial and ethnic composition Note: the US Census treats Hispanic/Latino as an ethnic category. This table excludes Latinos from the racial categories and assigns them to a separate category. Hispanics/Latinos may be of any race.
Race / Ethnicity (NH = Non-Hispanic)	Pop 2000	Pop 2010	Pop 2020	% 2000	% 2010	% 2020
White alone (NH)	1,538	1,439	1,112	82.47%	73.83%	55.63%
Black or African American alone (NH)	6	15	14	0.32%	0.77%	0.70%
Native American or Alaska Native alone (NH)	21	11	18	1.13%	0.56%	0.90%
Asian alone (NH)	13	11	9	0.70%	0.56%	0.45%
Native Hawaiian or Pacific Islander alone (NH)	16	0	12	0.86%	0.00%	0.60%
Other race alone (NH)	2	5	7	0.11%	0.26%	0.35%
Mixed race or Multiracial (NH)	24	27	87	1.29%	1.39%	4.35%
Hispanic or Latino (any race)	245	441	740	13.14%	22.63%	37.02%
Total	1,865	1,949	1,999	100.00%	100.00%	100.00%

=== 2020 census ===
As of the 2020 census, Taft Heights had a population of 1,999 and a population density of 6,753.4 inhabitants per square mile (2,607.5/km^{2}). 100.0% of residents lived in urban areas, while 0.0% lived in rural areas.

The racial makeup was 61.9% White, 0.7% African American, 1.4% Native American, 0.5% Asian, 0.7% Pacific Islander, 20.0% from other races, and 14.9% from two or more races.

The whole population lived in households. There were 684 households, out of which 44.6% included children under the age of 18, 41.1% were married-couple households, 13.7% were cohabiting couple households, 23.7% had a female householder with no spouse or partner present, and 21.5% had a male householder with no spouse or partner present. 22.5% of households were one person, and 8.3% had someone living alone who was 65 years of age or older. The average household size was 2.92. There were 482 families (70.5% of all households).

The age distribution was 29.7% under the age of 18, 9.5% aged 18 to 24, 30.6% aged 25 to 44, 19.7% aged 45 to 64, and 10.7% who were 65 years of age or older. The median age was 30.2 years. For every 100 females, there were 103.8 males, and for every 100 females age 18 and over there were 98.9 males age 18 and over.

There were 773 housing units at an average density of 2,611.5 units per square mile (1,008.3 units/km^{2}), of which 684 (88.5%) were occupied. Of these, 48.7% were owner-occupied, and 51.3% were occupied by renters. The vacancy rate was 11.5%; the homeowner vacancy rate was 1.5% and the rental vacancy rate was 7.8%.

=== 2023 estimates ===
In 2023, the US Census Bureau estimated that the median household income was $62,125, and the per capita income was $28,932. About 19.2% of families and 15.9% of the population were below the poverty line.
