= Erica Wheeler (disambiguation) =

Erica Wheeler (born 1991) is an American basketball player.

Erica Wheeler may also refer to:

- Erica Wheeler (singer-songwriter), American folk singer-songwriter
- Erica Wheeler (javelin thrower) (born 1967), American athlete in javelin throw
