= Charles Wheeler =

Charles Wheeler may refer to:

- Charles Wheeler (painter) (1881–1977), Australian painter
- Sir Charles Wheeler (sculptor) (1892–1974), president of the Royal Academy
- Charles Wheeler (journalist) (1923–2008), journalist with the BBC
- Charles B. Wheeler Jr. (1926–2022), Missouri politician
- Charles Barker Wheeler (1851–1935), American judge from New York
- Charles Brewster Wheeler, (1865–1946), U.S. Army brigadier general
- Charles F. Wheeler (1915–2004), American cinematographer (Tora! Tora! Tora!)
- Charles Gidley Wheeler (1938–2010), television screenwriter and historical novelist
- Charles K. Wheeler (1863–1933), U.S. representative from Kentucky
- Charles Stearns Wheeler (1816–1843), American Transcendalism pioneer
- Charles Stetson Wheeler (1863–1923), American attorney and University of California Regent
- Charles Allen Wheeler (1861–1932), American lawyer and member of the Texas Senate
- SS Charles L. Wheeler Jr., a cargo ship

== See also ==
- Charles B. Wheeler Downtown Airport, Kansas City
- Charlie Wheeler, character in Friends
- Charles Wheler (c. 1620–1683), English cavalry officer and MP
