= Wheeler Crest =

Coordinates: 37°31′41″N 118°41′15″W

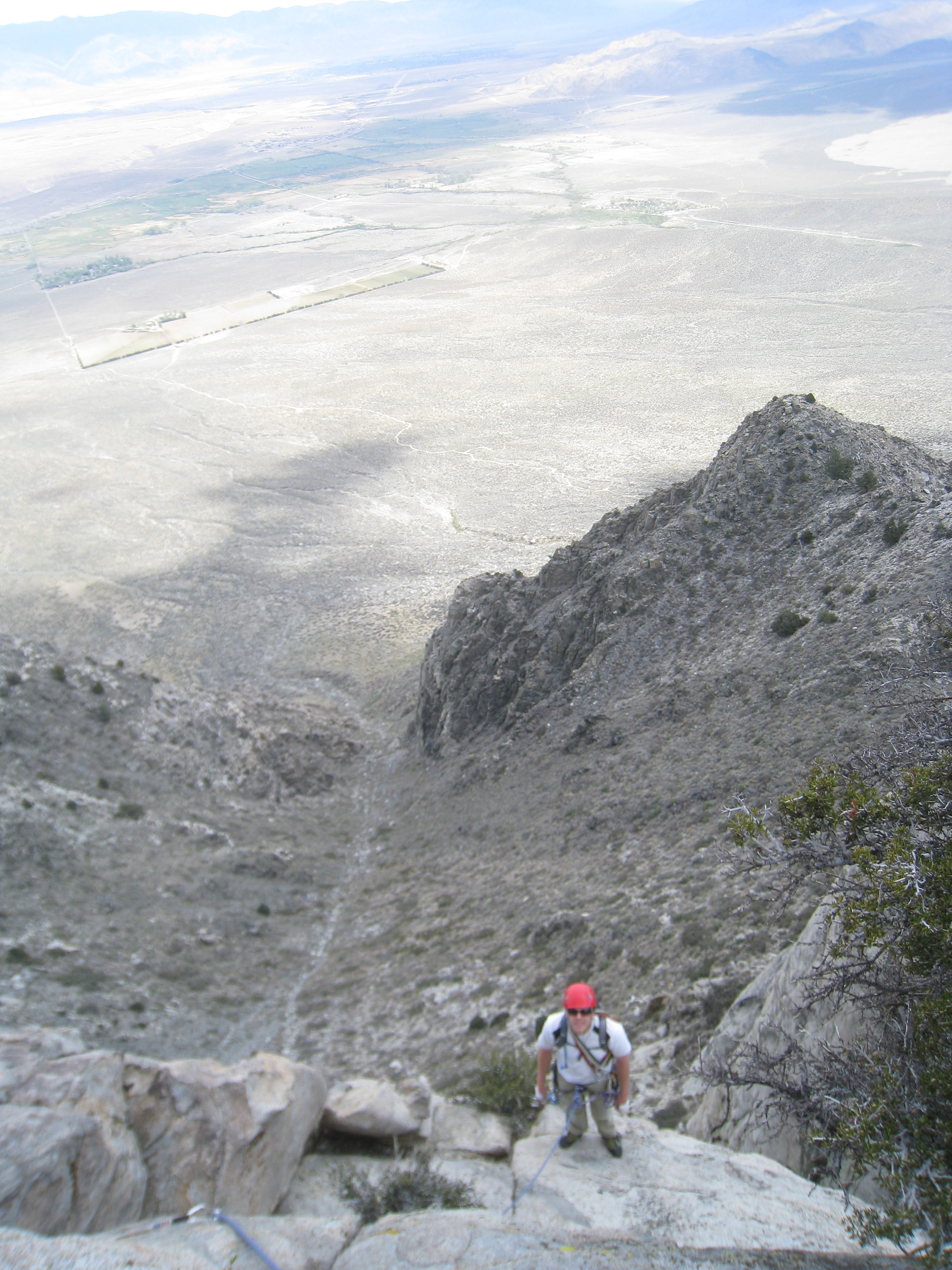
Owens Valley is thousands of feet below Wheeler Crest

The Wheeler Crest or Wheeler Ridge is a ridge in Mono and Inyo Counties, California. The crest is 8 miles (13 km) long, and partially lies in the John Muir Wilderness. The ridge is bound on the west by Rock Creek, on the north by the community of Toms Place, on the east by Round Valley, on the southeast by Gable Creek, and on the southwest by Morgan Creek.
