= Todd Valley, California =

Unincorporated community in California, United States

Todd's Valley
- Unincorporated community
- Location in California Todd's Valley (the United States)
- Coordinates: 38°59′53″N 120°51′06″W
- Country: United States
- State: California
- County: Placer County
- Elevation: 2,684 ft (818 m)

Todd Valley (also, Todd) is an unincorporated community in Placer County, California. Todd Valley is located on Todd Creek, 13 miles (20.9 km) east-northeast of Auburn. It lies at an elevation of 2684 feet (818 m).

The name honors Dr. F. Walton Todd, who opened a store there in 1849. Todd is said to have severely gouged local forty-niners desperate for supplies, selling "sour" flour for $2.50 a pound. The Todd Valley post office operated from 1856 to 1884. The Todd post office operated from 1885 to 1901.

In 1882, Todd's Valley was described as a "charming and prosperous village" of 226 people. The town was largely destroyed by fire on September 25, 1859, but was rebuilt and remained a gold mining center into the 1880s. The town later declined, having a population of only 25 in 1922. Today, Todd's Valley is a semi-rural area on the outskirts of Foresthill.
