= William Wheeler (disambiguation) =

William A. Wheeler (1819–1887) was the 19th vice president of the United States.

William, Billy, or Will Wheeler may also refer to:

- William Adolphus Wheeler (1833–1874), United States lexicographer
- William F. Wheeler (1824–1894), third U.S. Marshal for the Montana Territory
- William G. Wheeler (1861–1936), American legislator and lawyer
- William Wheeler (bishop) (1910–1998), British Roman Catholic Bishop of Leeds
- William McDonald Wheeler (1915–1989), American politician from Georgia
- William Morton Wheeler (1865–1937), American myrmecologist
- William Wheeler (Wisconsin politician) (1814–1881), American territorial legislator
- Billy Edd Wheeler (1932–2024), American songwriter and performer
- William Wheeler (engineer) (1851–1932), president of Sapporo Agricultural College in Japan (now Hokkaido University), from 1877 to 1879
- William Wheeler (cricketer), New Zealand cricketer
- William V. Wheeler (1845–1908), founder of Wheeler Mission Ministries of Indianapolis, Indiana
- William E. Wheeler (1843–1911), American businessman and politician from New York
- William W. Wheeler, United States Navy admiral
- Will Wheeler (born 1974), politician

== See also ==
- William Wheler (c.1611–1666), British Member of Parliament from 1640 to 1660
