= Geoffrey Wheeler =

Geoffrey or Jeff Wheeler may refer to:

- Geoffrey Wheeler (historian) (1897–1990), British soldier and historian
- Geoffrey Wheeler (broadcaster) (1930–2013), English broadcaster
- Jeff Wheeler, rally racer, see Sno*Drift
