= Trigo (company) =

Technology company

Trigo Vision Ltd.
- Industry: Automated retail, retail technology, computer vision
- Founded: 2018
- Founder: Michael Gabay, Daniel Gabay
- Headquarters: Tel Aviv, Israel
- Key people: Michael Gabay - CEO
- Website: https://www.trigoretail.com/

Trigo is a computer vision technology company founded by Michael and Daniel Gabay in 2018. Trigo provides a cashierless shopping solution for grocery retailers to implement partially or fully automated stores.

== History ==
Trigo was founded in 2018 by Michael and Daniel Gabay. The first pilot began in 2019 with UK grocery retailer Tesco to trial Trigo's cashierless checkout technology at the Tesco employee headquarters in Welwyn Garden, UK, which remains open with Trigo's technology, as of August 2022.

On October 19, 2021, Trigo launched its second store with Tesco, on High Holborn Street in London, who named the checkout-free store 'GetGo.' In 2021, Trigo also opened stores with retailers REWE in Cologne, Germany on October 26, 2021;, and Netto Marken-Discount in Munich, Germany on December 16, 2021.

In late 2021, Trigo announced a partnership with Aldi Nord and opened its first store in Utrecht, the Netherlands in July, 2022.

In late 2022, Trigo opened an additional store with REWE in Berlin, Germany.

In January 2023, Trigo opened its first store in the United States, partnering with Wakefern Food Corp.

In May 2023 Trigo partnered with Auchan to open a cashless grocery store at its headquarters in Villeneuve-d'Ascq, France.

== Technology and data privacy ==
Trigo claims that their cashierless shopping technology is able to create and manage digital shopping baskets while preserving privacy and data protection. The system operates without using facial recognition or biometric features, and focuses on the tracking of a shopper's journey through the store and their interactions with items within the store.

The personal data of shoppers is transferred to Israel and to "cloud-based service providers" around the world, including the United States. For shoppers located within the European Economic Area (EEA), Trigo claims to employ "appropriate safeguards" to protect personal data when it is transferred outside of the EEA and Israel.

== Funding ==
Trigo raised $7M in seed funding in 2018, led by Hetz and Vertex Ventures, a $22M series A in 2019, led by Red Dot Ventures, and a $60M series B, led by 83North and included Tesco. In June 2021, Trigo raised an additional $10M in capital from REWE and Viola Ventures. In October 2022 Trigo raised $100M, bringing its total funding to $204M.

== Stores ==
Trigo operates the following stores:

Location	Retailer	Store type	Store size (sq. ft.)	SKUs	Live from
Welwyn Garden City, UK	Tesco	Hybrid	3,000	2,000	November 2020
High Holborn Street, London	Tesco	100% autonomous	2,500	2,500	October 19, 2021
Cologne, Germany	REWE	Hybrid	2,000	2,000	October 26, 2021
Munich, Germany	Netto	Hybrid	2,600	3,500	December 16, 2021
Utrecht, Netherlands	Aldi Nord	100% autonomous	4,090	1,400+	July 20, 2021
Tel-Aviv, Israel	Shufersal	Hybrid	1,080	1,500+	September 9, 2022
Chiswell, London, UK	Tesco	Hybrid	2,700	3,320	November 1, 2022
Berlin, Germany	REWE	Hybrid	4,300	10,000	November 9, 2022
Fullham, London, UK	Tesco	Hybrid	2,530	3,330	November 22, 2022
Munich, Germany	REWE	100% autonomous	3,100	4,000	December 14, 2022
