= Paul Wheeler =

Paul Wheeler may refer to:

- Paul Wheeler (footballer) (born 1965), Welsh footballer
- Paul Wheeler (writer) (1934–2025), British screenwriter and novelist
- Paul Wheeler (rugby union) (born 1947), Welsh rugby union player
