= Wheeler Block =

Wheeler Block may refer to:

- Wheeler Block (Denver, Colorado), a Denver Landmark
- Wheeler Block (Colchester, Connecticut), listed on the National Register of Historic Places in New London County
- Wheeler Block (Toledo, Ohio), formerly listed on the National Register of Historic Places in Lucas County, Ohio
