= Trevarno, Livermore, California =

Area of Livermore, California, United States

Coordinates: 37°41′26″N 121°44′51″W

Trevarno is a section of Livermore, Alameda County, California, built by a Cornish company, based at Trevarno, near Helston, manufacturing safety fuses. It is between First Street and the railroad and lies at an elevation of 535 feet (163 m). Trevarno is Cornish and means "farm/settlement of Varno". For more information, see Cornish surnames. Officials of Coast Manufacturing and Supply Company in Livermore named the area after George Bickford's home in Cornwall. The company made safety fuses invented by William Bickford, George's father.

== History ==
Coast Manufacturing build its own street and constructed a two-story brick building for its headquarters with thirteen homes for its officers. Most of them were modest bungalow-style craftsman houses, but one, occupied the company's president, is a larger Mission Revival home which still stands at the corner of First Street and Trevarno Road. It was reported to be the largest home in the Livermore Valley when built. In 1976, the houses were sold to a local developer, renamed Trevarno Estates, and resold to individual homeowners.

The firm of Bickford, Smith and Davey expanded to the US in 1832–39 with the firm Bacon, Bickford, Bales and Company. In 1839 Joseph Toy was sent to expand the market further. Toy's son-in-law, in 1867, expanded the business further by starting another company, Coast Manufacturing and Supply Company, which much later in 1913–14 moved its operations to Livermore, California. Here, the company built houses for its workforce and named them Trevarno Road after the [home of the] creator of the safety fuse.

In 1968, the coast company (now manufacturing fibreglass products) merged with the Hexcel Corporation. The fuse business was sold to Apache Powder Company in Benson, Arizona and the houses on Trevarno Road were sold.
