= Bartlett, Nebraska =

Village in and county seat of Wheeler County, Nebraska, United States

- Village
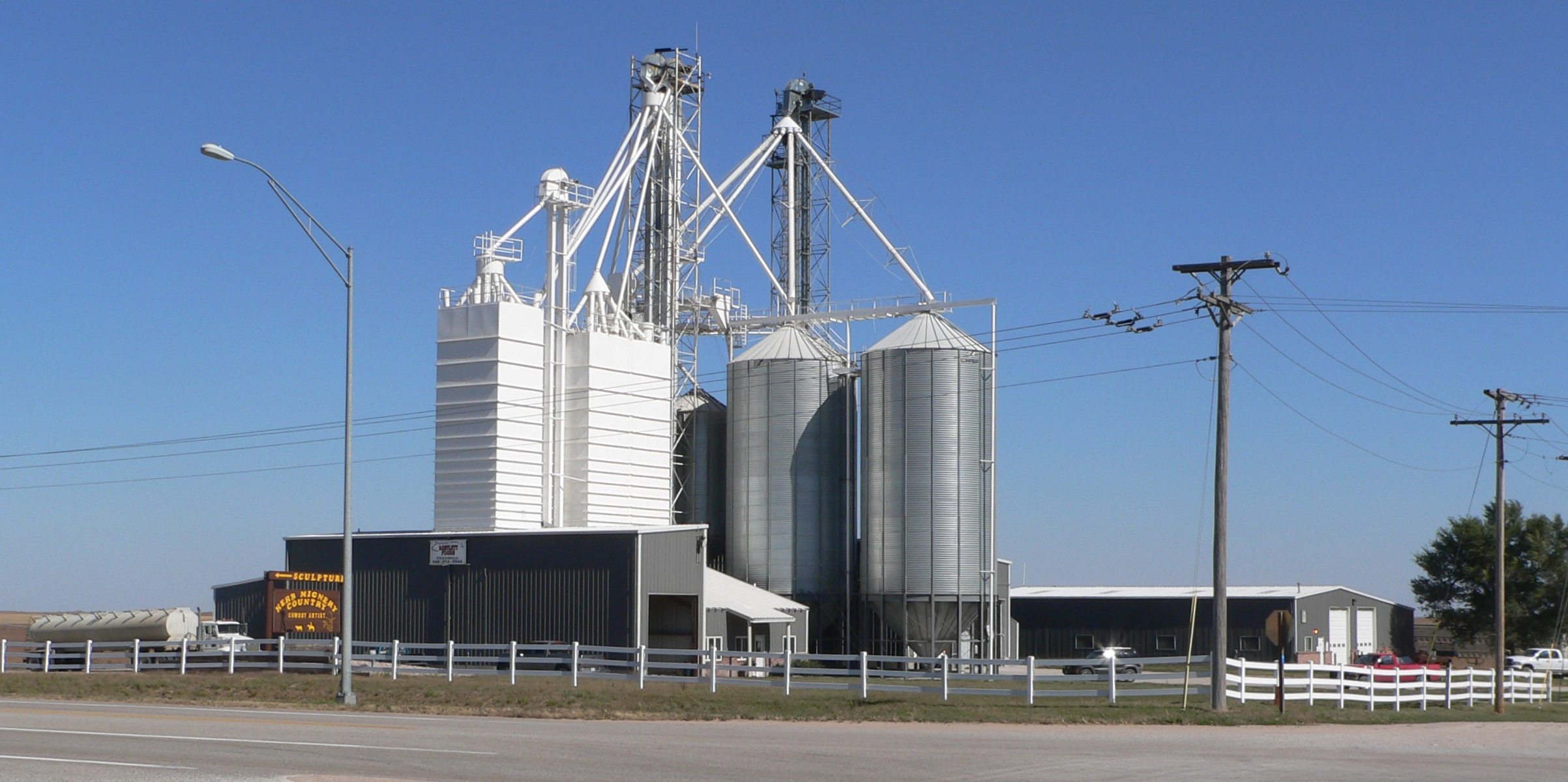
- Bartlett Foods feed mill at Bartlett

- Location of Bartlett, Nebraska
- Coordinates: 41°53′02″N 98°33′09″W
- Country: United States
- State: Nebraska
- County: Wheeler

Area
  - Total: 0.14 sq mi (0.37 km^{2})
  - Land: 0.14 sq mi (0.37 km^{2})
  - Water: 0 sq mi (0.00 km^{2})
- Elevation: 2,182 ft (665 m)

Population (2020)
  - Total: 109
  - Density: 767.2/sq mi (296.21/km^{2})
- Time zone: UTC-6 (Central (CST))
  - Summer (DST): UTC-5 (CDT)
- ZIP code: 68622
- Area code: 308
- FIPS code: 31-03145
- GNIS feature ID: 2398042

Bartlett is a village in and the county seat of Wheeler County, Nebraska, United States. As of the 2020 census, Bartlett had a population of 109.

== History ==
Bartlett was founded in the 1880s. It was named for Ezra Bartlett Mitchell, the original owner of the town site.

== Geography ==
According to the United States Census Bureau, the village has a total area of 0.14 square miles (0.36 km^{2}), all land.

=== Climate ===
Climate data for Bartlett, Nebraska (2006-2020 precipitation normals, coordinates:41.8858°N 98.5631°W)
Month	Jan	Feb	Mar	Apr	May	Jun	Jul	Aug	Sep	Oct	Nov	Dec	Year
Mean daily maximum °F (°C)	35.3 (1.8)	37.5 (3.1)	52.0 (11.1)	62.2 (16.8)	72.4 (22.4)	84.0 (28.9)	88.2 (31.2)	84.7 (29.3)	77.9 (25.5)	63.8 (17.7)	51.6 (10.9)	36.5 (2.5)	62.2 (16.8)
Daily mean °F (°C)	24.3 (−4.3)	25.5 (−3.6)	39.1 (3.9)	48.3 (9.1)	59.0 (15.0)	71.2 (21.8)	75.7 (24.3)	72.6 (22.6)	64.7 (18.2)	50.5 (10.3)	38.6 (3.7)	25.8 (−3.4)	49.6 (9.8)
Mean daily minimum °F (°C)	13.3 (−10.4)	13.4 (−10.3)	26.2 (−3.2)	34.4 (1.3)	45.6 (7.6)	58.4 (14.7)	63.2 (17.3)	60.5 (15.8)	51.6 (10.9)	37.2 (2.9)	25.6 (−3.6)	15.1 (−9.4)	37.0 (2.8)
Average precipitation inches (mm)	1.41 (36)	0.60 (15)	1.48 (38)	3.09 (78)	4.35 (110)	4.07 (103)	3.30 (84)	3.67 (93)	2.16 (55)	2.94 (75)	0.63 (16)	1.18 (30)	28.88 (733)
Source: NOAA

== Demographics ==
Historical population
Census	Pop.	Note	%±
1920	132		—
1930	133		0.8%
1940	176		32.3%
1950	145		−17.6%
1960	125		−13.8%
1970	140		12.0%
1980	144		2.9%
1990	131		−9.0%
2000	128		−2.3%
2010	117		−8.6%
2020	109		−6.8%
U.S. Decennial Census

=== 2010 census ===
At the 2010 census there were 117 people, 59 households, and 30 families in the village. The population density was 835.7 inhabitants per square mile (322.7/km^{2}). There were 68 housing units at an average density of 485.7 per square mile (187.5/km^{2}). The racial makeup of the village was 100.0% White. Of the 59 households 20.3% had children under the age of 18 living with them, 42.4% were married couples living together, 5.1% had a female householder with no husband present, 3.4% had a male householder with no wife present, and 49.2% were non-families. 45.8% of households were one person and 15.3% were one person aged 65 or older. The average household size was 1.98 and the average family size was 2.87.

The median age in the village was 42.2 years. 23.9% of residents were under the age of 18; 3.5% were between the ages of 18 and 24; 24.8% were from 25 to 44; 33.2% were from 45 to 64; and 14.5% were 65 or older. The gender makeup of the village was 50.4% male and 49.6% female.

=== 2000 census ===
At the 2000 census there were 128 people, 57 households, and 33 families in the village. The population density was 903.5 inhabitants per square mile (348.8/km^{2}). There were 68 housing units at an average density of 480.0 per square mile (185.3/km^{2}). The racial makeup of the village was 100.00% White. Of the 57 households 26.3% had children under the age of 18 living with them, 50.9% were married couples living together, 7.0% had a female householder with no husband present, and 40.4% were non-families. 38.6% of households were one person and 15.8% were one person aged 65 or older. The average household size was 2.25 and the average family size was 3.00.

The age distribution was 25.8% under the age of 18, 8.6% from 18 to 24, 22.7% from 25 to 44, 24.2% from 45 to 64, and 18.8% 65 or older. The median age was 41 years. For every 100 females, there were 82.9 males. For every 100 females age 18 and over, there were 90.0 males.

The median household income was $33,250, and the median family income was $41,875. Males had a median income of $25,625 versus $15,625 for females. The per capita income for the village was $18,025. There were no families and 2.5% of the population living below the poverty line, including no under eighteens and 13.0% of those over 64.

== See also ==
- List of municipalities in Nebraska
