= Town Talk, California =

Unincorporated community in California, United States

Town Talk
- Unincorporated community
- Location in California Town Talk (the United States)
- Coordinates: 39°14′36″N 121°01′51″W
- Country: United States
- State: California
- County: Nevada County
- Elevation: 2,776 ft (846 m)

Town Talk was a historic mining community in Nevada County, California. Town Talk was located 2.5 miles (4.0 km) northeast of Grass Valley. It was the site of the Town Talk Mine and a rail tunnel on the line between Grass Valley and Nevada City. Town Talk was reportedly centered on a house known as the Town Talk Saloon that sold food to miners and passing teamsters.
