= Toms Place, California =

Unincorporated community in California, United States

Toms Place
- Unincorporated community
- Location in California Toms Place (the United States)
- Coordinates: 37°33′41″N 118°40′52″W
- Country: United States
- State: California
- County: Mono
- Elevation: 7,090 ft (2,161 m)

Toms Place (formerly Hans Lof's) is an unincorporated community in Mono County, California, United States. It is located on Rock Creek, 10 miles (16 km) east of Mount Morrison, at an elevation of 7090 feet (2161 m). The ZIP Code is 93546.

Hans Lof started a resort at the place called Hans Lof's in 1919. Tom Yernby bought the place in 1922 and renamed it. Yernby operated the resort until 1935. The Toms Place post office opened in 1963.

== Notable person ==
- James Whitmore owned several homes and made it his primary residence for many years. Members of his family still live in Toms Place as of 2013.
