= Charles Barker Wheeler =

American judge (1851–1935)

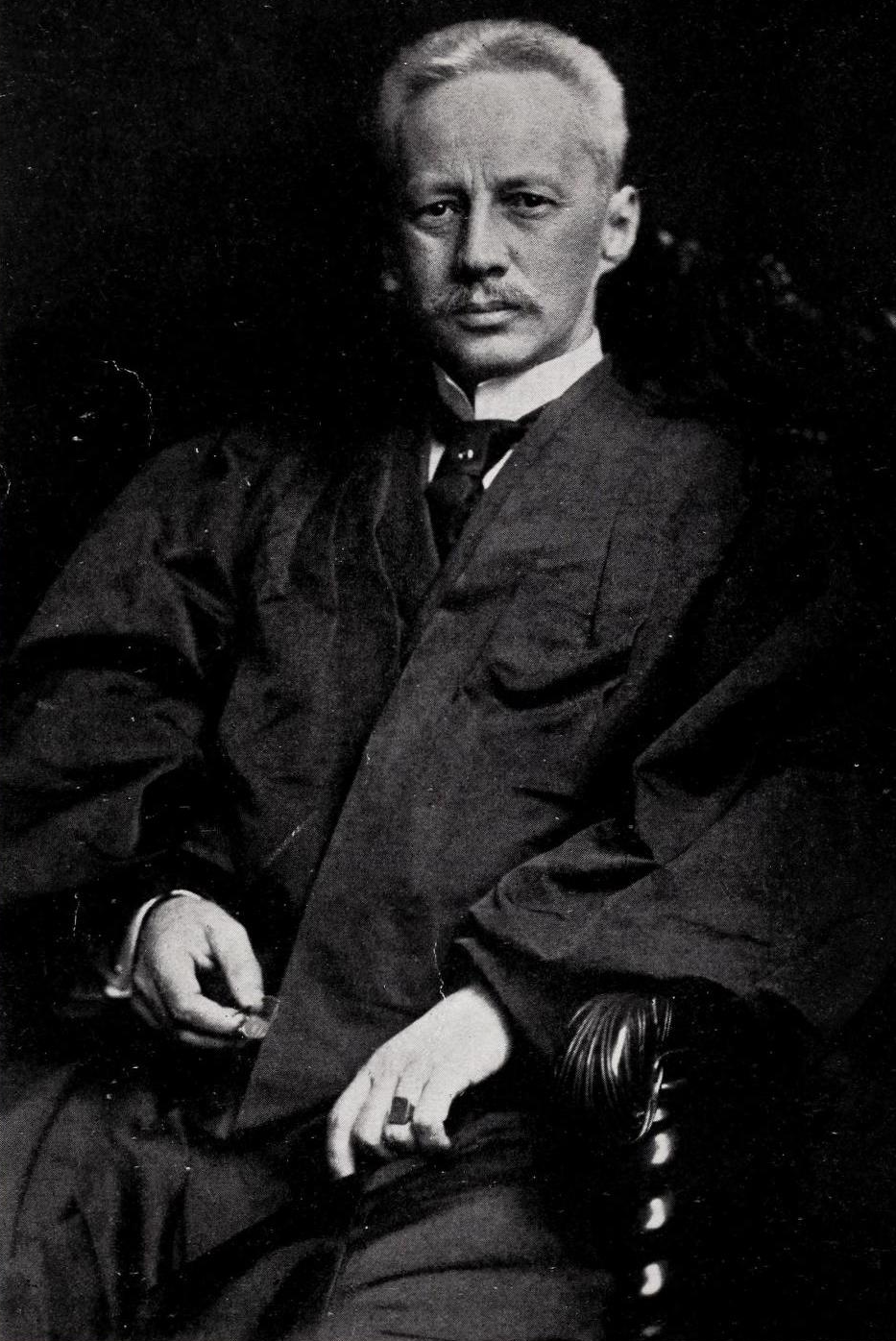
- Portrait of Wheeler in a 1914 publication
- Born: December 27, 1851; Poplar Ridge, New York, U.S.
- Died: November 21, 1935 (aged 83); Buffalo, New York, U.S.
- Resting place: Forest Lawn Cemetery
- Education: Williams College (BA)
- Occupations: Lawyer; judge
- Spouse(s): Frances Munro Rochester (m. 1883; died 1921) Ruth Gunther Winant (m. 1931)
- Children: 2

Signature
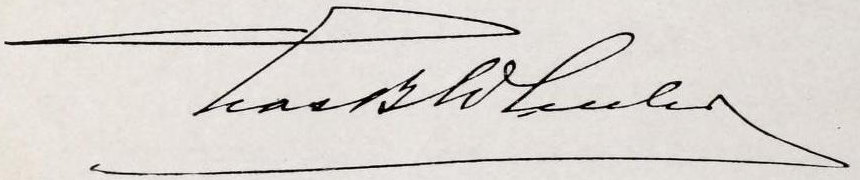

Charles Barker Wheeler (December 27, 1851 – November 21, 1935) was an American judge from New York. He served as justice of the New York Supreme Court from 1906 to 1921.

== Early life ==
Charles Barker Wheeler was born on December 27, 1851, in Poplar Ridge, New York, to Jane (née Barker) and Cyrenus Wheeler Jr. His father was an inventor of harvesting equipment and served as mayor of Auburn. He attended the district school in Poplar Ridge, grew up in Auburn and graduated from Auburn High School in 1869. He graduated from Williams College in 1873 with a Bachelor of Arts. He was a member of the Alpha Delta Phi fraternity. He studied law in the office of Sprague & Gorham and later in the office of Sprague, Gorham & Bacon in Buffalo. He was admitted to the bar to the bar in 1876.

== Career ==
Wheeler began practicing law in Buffalo. He then practiced with Sherman S. Rogers and Franklin D. Locke. He was a member of the firm Bowen, Rogers & Locke. In 1884, he opened his own law practice and practiced there until 1906. He was a member of the Municipal Civil Service Commission from 1889 to his resignation in 1899 and was president of the commission for eight years. He re-joined the commission in 1902 and retired in February 1905.

In 1906, he was selected as a member of the special tax commission to examine and report on the tax system of New York. On November 28, 1906, he was appointed by Governor Frank W. Higgins as a justice to fill a vacancy on the New York Supreme Court (8th judicial district) following the resignation of Daniel J. Kenefick. In 1907, he was nominated by both the Republican and Democratic parties and was elected to a regular term of 14 years. He retired on December 31, 1921, due to the age limit. On January 3, 1922, he was appointed as official referee to the court. He continued this role until his death.

Wheeler was connected with the Title Insurance Company.

== Personal life ==
Wheeler married Frances Munro Rochester, daughter of Dr. Thomas Fortescue Rochester, granddaughter of William H. DeLancey and great-granddaughter of Nathaniel Rochester, on June 28, 1883. They had two children, Thomas Rochester and Jane Barker. His wife died in 1921. He married Ruth Gunther Winant, daughter of Henry Darlington Winant, of New York on August 9, 1931, at St. George's, Hanover Square in London. His wife was a poet. He was a member of the University Club of Buffalo. He lived on Elmwood Avenue in Buffalo. He was a vestryman of Trinity Episcopal Church.

Wheeler died on November 21, 1935, at Buffalo General Hospital. He was buried in Forest Lawn Cemetery.

== Awards ==
In 1913, Wheeler received an honorary degree of Doctor of Laws from Williams College.
