= Thomas C. Wheeler =

American judge (born 1948)

Thomas Wheeler
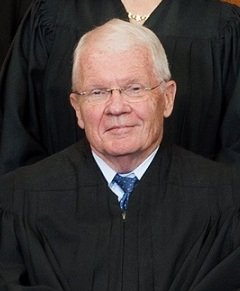
- Wheeler in 2017

Judge of the United States Court of Federal Claims
- In office October 24, 2005 – October 23, 2020
- Appointed by: George W. Bush
- Preceded by: Diane Gilbert Sypolt
- Succeeded by: Zachary Somers

Personal details
- Born: Thomas Craig Wheeler; March 18, 1948 (age 78) Chicago, Illinois, U.S.
- Education: Gettysburg College (BA); Georgetown University (JD)

Thomas Craig Wheeler (born March 18, 1948) is a former judge of the United States Court of Federal Claims, appointed to that court in 2005 by President George W. Bush.

== Early life, education, and career ==
Born in Chicago, Illinois, Wheeler received a Bachelor of Arts from Gettysburg College, Gettysburg, Pennsylvania, in 1970, and a Juris Doctor from Georgetown University Law Center in 1973. From 1973 to 2005, Wheeler was in private practice in Washington, D.C. He was an associate and partner in the law firm of Pettit & Martin until 1995, and then moved as a partner to the law firm of Piper & Marbury (later Piper Marbury Rudnick & Wolfe, and then DLA Piper Rudnick Gray Cary). During his years in private practice, Wheeler specialized in Government Contract claims, litigation, and counseling, representing a wide variety of large and small business clients. He appeared before many agency boards of contract appeals, the United States Court of Federal Claims and its predecessors, the United States Court of Appeals for the Federal Circuit, a number of United States District Courts, and the Government Accountability Office (formerly the General Accounting Office).

=== Claims court service ===
Wheeler was appointed to the United States Court of Federal Claims on October 24, 2005. He is a member of the District of Columbia Bar, and of the American Bar Association's Public Contracts and Litigation Sections. He retired on October 23, 2020.

== Personal life ==
Wheeler is married, and has two grown children. He is active in his church and community, and he previously served for many years as a youth soccer coach and referee. His outside interests include skiing, photography, writing, softball, and hiking.

Legal offices
| Preceded by Diane Gilbert Sypolt | Judge of the United States Court of Federal Claims; 2005–2020 | Succeeded by Zachary Somers |
