= Trigo, Madera County, California =

Unincorporated community in California, United States

Trigo
- Unincorporated community
- Location in California Trigo (the United States)
- Coordinates: 36°54′47″N 119°57′38″W
- Country: United States
- State: California
- County: Madera
- Elevation: 289 ft (88 m)

Trigo (Spanish for "Wheat") is an unincorporated community in Madera County, California, United States. It is located 7 miles (11 km) east-southeast of Madera, at an elevation of 289 feet (88 m).

== History ==
Trigo was formerly called Patterson. A post office operated at Trigo from 1912 to 1942. Trigo was subdivided circa 1911 and settled by deeply religious farmers from Iowa and Colorado, who quickly scattered. A store, church, school, Santa Fe freight station, and warehouses once stood in the town. By 1979, Trigo consisted of "15 houses and 12 mobile homes". A few residences remained as of 2023.
