= Abbot Pass hut =

Historic building in Alberta, Canada

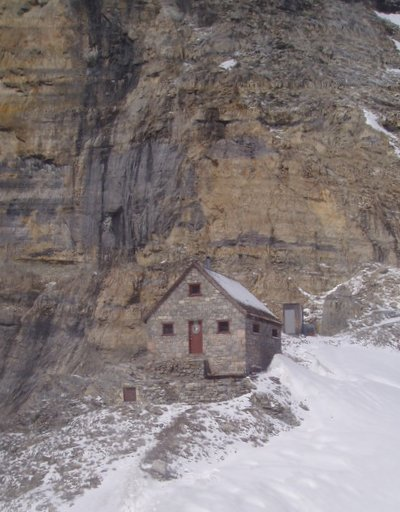

General information
- Status: Closed
- Type: alpine hut
- Architectural style: Stone Cabin
- Location: Abbot Pass, Canada
- Coordinates: 51°21′50.598″N 116°17′24.7488″W
- Opened: 1922
- Closed: 2018
- Demolished: 2022
- Owner: Alpine Club of Canada

Technical details
- Material: Stone

Design and construction
- Architect: Canadian Pacific Railway

Website
- https://www.alpineclubofcanada.ca/web/ACCMember/Huts/Abbot_Pass_Hut.aspx

The Abbot Pass hut was an alpine hut located at an altitude of 2,925 metres (9,596 ft) in Abbot Pass in the Rocky Mountains in Alberta, Canada. It was nestled between Mount Victoria and Mount Lefroy, straddling the Great Divide, which, in this region, defines the boundary between Banff National Park in Alberta and Yoho National Park in British Columbia. While close to the border, the hut lay entirely in Banff National Park, and was the second-highest permanently habitable structure in Canada (after the Neil Colgan Hut). The hut was maintained by the Alpine Club of Canada.

Abbot Pass hut was declared a National Heritage site in 1992. It was closed in the summer of 2018 pending a geotechnical evaluation of the slope which underlay the structure, after a hiker noticed erosion on its eastern side, due to melting glacier ice. The COVID-19 pandemic delayed repair work; by the time work was able to begin again, the hut was deemed irreparable. In June 2022, it was demolished.

== History ==
The pass and the hut are named after Philip Stanley Abbot (1867–1896), who became the first mountaineering fatality in North America after he fell in an attempt to make the first ascent of Mount Lefroy in 1896. The hut was built in 1922 by Swiss guides working for the Canadian Alpine Association to shelter clients attempting to climb Victoria and Lefroy. Much of the construction material was carried from Lake Louise on horseback across the Victoria Glacier and winched or carried on guides' backs up the pass on a route known as The Deathtrap because of its exposure to avalanches and crevasses.

The CAC operated the hut for 40 years, and in the 1960s turned the operation over to Parks Canada, which renovated it with the help of volunteers. In 1985, the park service turned the hut over to the Alpine Club of Canada, which renovated it several times. The hut was designated Abbot Pass Refuge Cabin National Historic Site of Canada in 1992, and, in 1997, a federal plaque was placed outside its front door.

Because many guests of the Chateau Lake Louise were trying mountaineering for the first time, Edward Feuz, a Swiss guide, suggested that the CPR build a rest stop between Lake Louise and the hut. In 1924 the Plain of Six Glaciers Tea House was built to accommodate overnight guests.

== Access ==
Abbot Pass (and the hut) may be approached from either the Lake O'Hara area on the British Columbia side (hiking past Lake Oesa), or the more technically demanding route from Lake Louise on the Alberta side. The hut was rarely used in winter due to avalanche hazard.

=== From Lake O'Hara ===
The approach via Lake O'Hara was by far the most popular route to the hut. It was safer and less technical than going in via the Deathtrap or the Fuhrmann Ledges. It involved about 900 metres (3,000 feet) of elevation gain and 3 to 5+ hours from Lake O'Hara to the hut depending on conditions and the strength of the party. Some groups were caught out overnight on the trail or stranded at the hut in bad weather conditions.

The first hurdle on this approach was getting on the bus to Lake O'Hara. The bus is operated by Parks Canada and is used to control the number of people going to Lake O'Hara. Reservations are difficult to obtain; however an automatic reservation on the bus could be obtained by booking a reservation at the Abbot Pass hut with the Alpine Club of Canada. The alternative was to walk 10 km up the access road carrying all equipment.

From Lake O'Hara, people going to the hut could follow the signed hiking trails to Lake Oesa to a sign marking the end of the Parks Canada trail, at which point it became largely scrambling. A trail was built to the hut by the Alpine Club, but parts of it were sometimes erased by rockslides, so route finding skills are helpful. It is steep and covered with scree. A helmet is a good safety precaution in case of rockfall, and an ice axe in case of ice or snow on the trail. One avalanche fatality occurred on the route, so it should not be undertaken when avalanches are possible.

=== From Lake Louise ===
The route from Lake Louise involves significant objective hazards. A broad path leads from the Chateau Lake Louise along the lake shore past the teahouse and on to the Plain of Six Glaciers. It then continues into the deep gorge between Mount Victoria and Mount Lefroy - known as The Deathtrap. Persons going through this should move rapidly in case of serac fall or avalanches from the glaciers above. It involves crossing a number of crevasses in the glacier and may be impassible due to wall-to-wall bergschrund at the upper end. This is not an attractive route and should only be attempted by strong alpinists when there is deep snow cover on the glacier.

== Activities ==
The hut was often used as a base for alpine climbing on Mount Victoria and Mount Lefroy (both over 3400 metres / 11,000 feet), and as a destination in itself for ambitious hikers. One of the reasons for the popularity of the hut was that climbers can ascend both Victoria and Lefroy in a weekend.

The normal route up Mount Lefroy (3423 m / 11,230 ft) is via the west face, going straight up the slopes from the hut toward the summit. There are routes up three separate gullies from the hut. The choice of the best one depends on snow conditions.

The most popular route up Mount Victoria 3,464 m (11,365 ft) is from the hut via the southeast ridge to the south summit. Another popular route is a traverse of Mount Victoria, which can be done in either direction, either to or from the hut.

== Facilities ==
The hut slept 24 on its upper floor, and had both a wood stove for heating and drying, and a propane system for cooking and lighting. Wood and propane were flown in annually by helicopter, by the Alpine Club of Canada. There was a drum-type outhouse a short distance from the hut and human waste was flown out by helicopter.

== Nearby ==
- Mount Victoria
- Mount Lefroy
- Lake Louise
- Lake O'Hara
- Elizabeth Parker hut

== Maps ==
| Map reference | NTS 82N8 Lake Louise |
| Grid reference | 495903 |
| GPS coordinates | 51°21′54″N 116°17′12″W NAD83 11U 549660 5690657 |
| Hut elevation | 2925 metres (9,598 feet). |

- "Topographic map of Abbot Pass hut". opentopomap.org.
- Lake O'Hara (Map). 1:20,000. The Adventure Map. Chrismar Mapping Services. ISBN 0-929140-39-7. This map shows trails and area highlights in detail
- Lake O'Hara (Map). 1:20,000. Guides for Hiking and Recreation in the Canadian Rockies. Gem Trek Publishing. ISBN 978-1-895526-38-7. Archived from the original on 2007-10-17. This map shows trails and area highlights in detail
- Lake Louise and Yoho (Map). 1:50,000. Guides for Hiking and Recreation in the Canadian Rockies. Gem Trek Publishing. ISBN 1-895526-64-7. Archived from the original on 2009-02-02.
- 82N/8 (Lake Louise) (Map). 1:50,000. National Topographic System (NTS). Canadian Government. Archived from the original on 2007-12-24.
