= Abbot Pass =

Mountain pass in Alberta, Canada

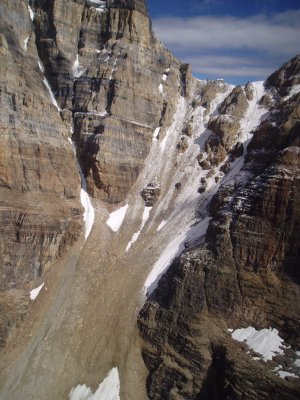
- Abbot Pass, with the approach from the British Columbia side

- Location within Alberta Location within British Columbia
- Elevation: 2,925 m (9,596 ft)

Third Approach
- Location: Banff National Park, Alberta / Yoho National Park, British Columbia, Canada
- Range: Canadian Rockies
- Coordinates: 51°21′59″N 116°17′04″W
- Topo map: NTS 82N8 Lake Louise

Abbot Pass lies between Mount Lefroy and Mount Victoria, in the divide between the valleys of Lake O'Hara and Lake Louise. It was named for Philip Stanley Abbot who died in 1896 in an attempt to climb Mount Lefroy with Charles Fay, Charles Thompson, and George T. Little.

Abbot Pass has a stone hut, built in 1922 by Swiss guides working for the Canadian Pacific Railway, and was maintained by the Alpine Club of Canada. In 2022, the hut was removed by Parks Canada due to erosion making the structure unsafe.

== Climate ==
Based on the Köppen climate classification, Abbot Pass is located in a subarctic climate zone with cold, snowy winters, and mild summers. Winter temperatures can drop below −20 °C with wind chill factors below −30 °C.

== Gallery ==
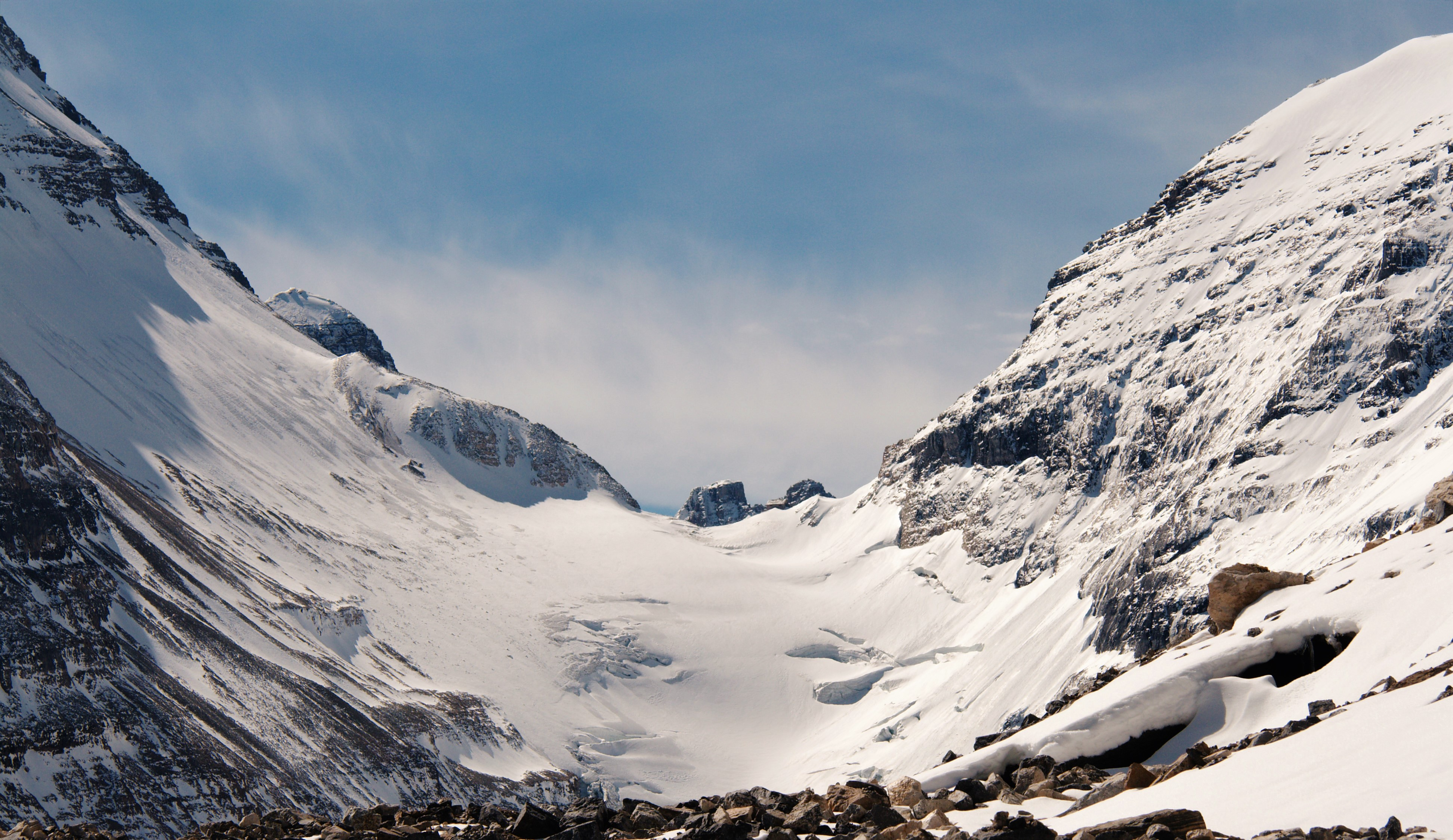
Abbot Pass from the Alberta side

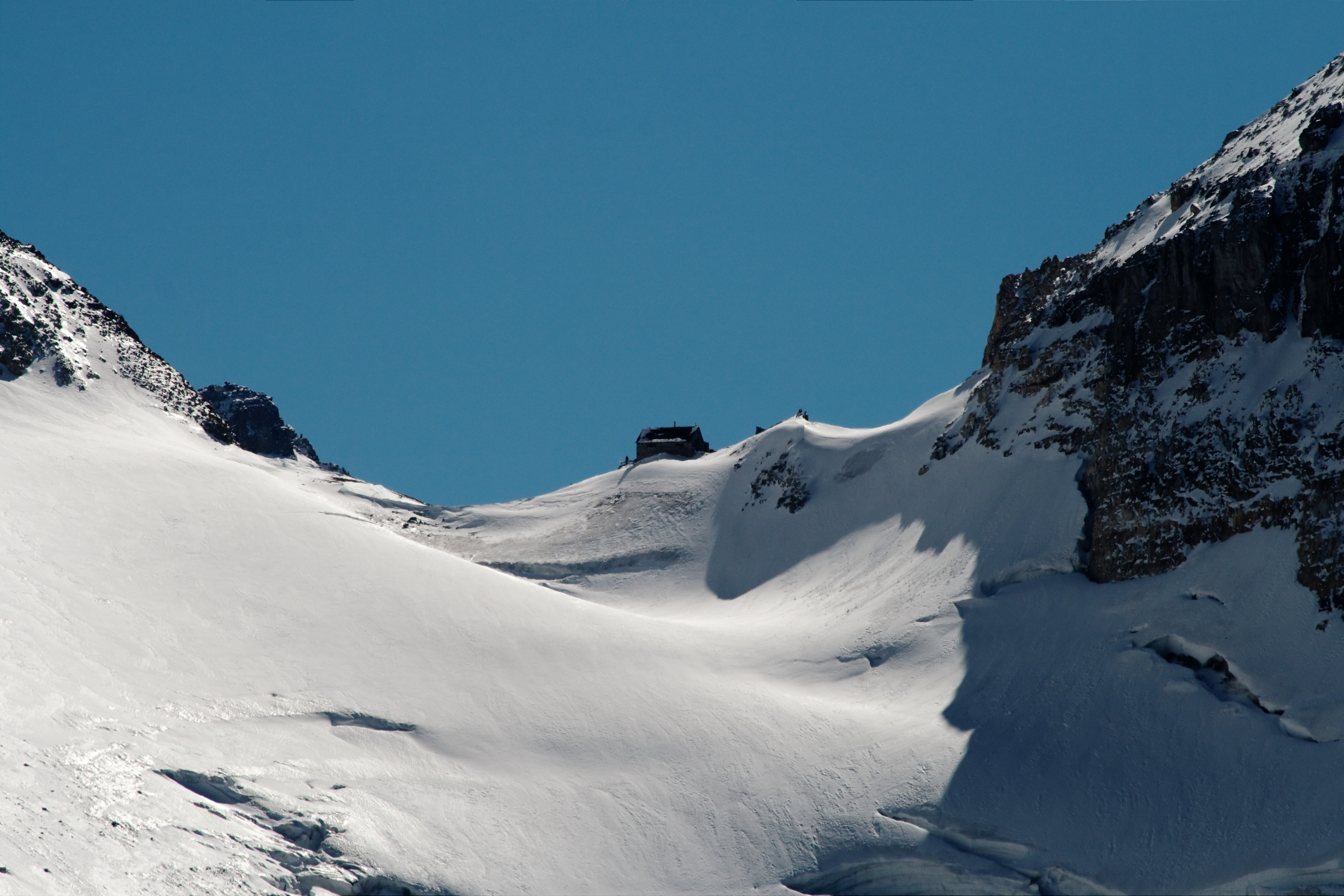
Abbot Pass and hut seen from Alberta side
