= List of lakes of Yoho National Park =

The following is a brief list of some of the major lakes in Yoho National Park. Yoho National Park is one of the major mountain parks in the Canadian Rockies. The region has extraordinary topographical and hydro-graphical features, including significant peaks, waterfalls, lakes, and canyons.

- Cathedral Lake
- Duchesnay Lake
- Emerald Lake
- Fany Lake
- Hidden Lake
- Hungaman Lake
- Kiwetinok Lake
- Linda Lake
- Mypole Lake
- Mary Lake
- McyDees Lake
- Monica Lake
- Morning Glory Lake
- Opabin Lake
- Lake McArthur
- Lake Oesa
- Lake O'Hara
- Lake Pinas
- Sherbrooke Lake
- Wapta Lake
- Yoho Lake

== Gallery ==
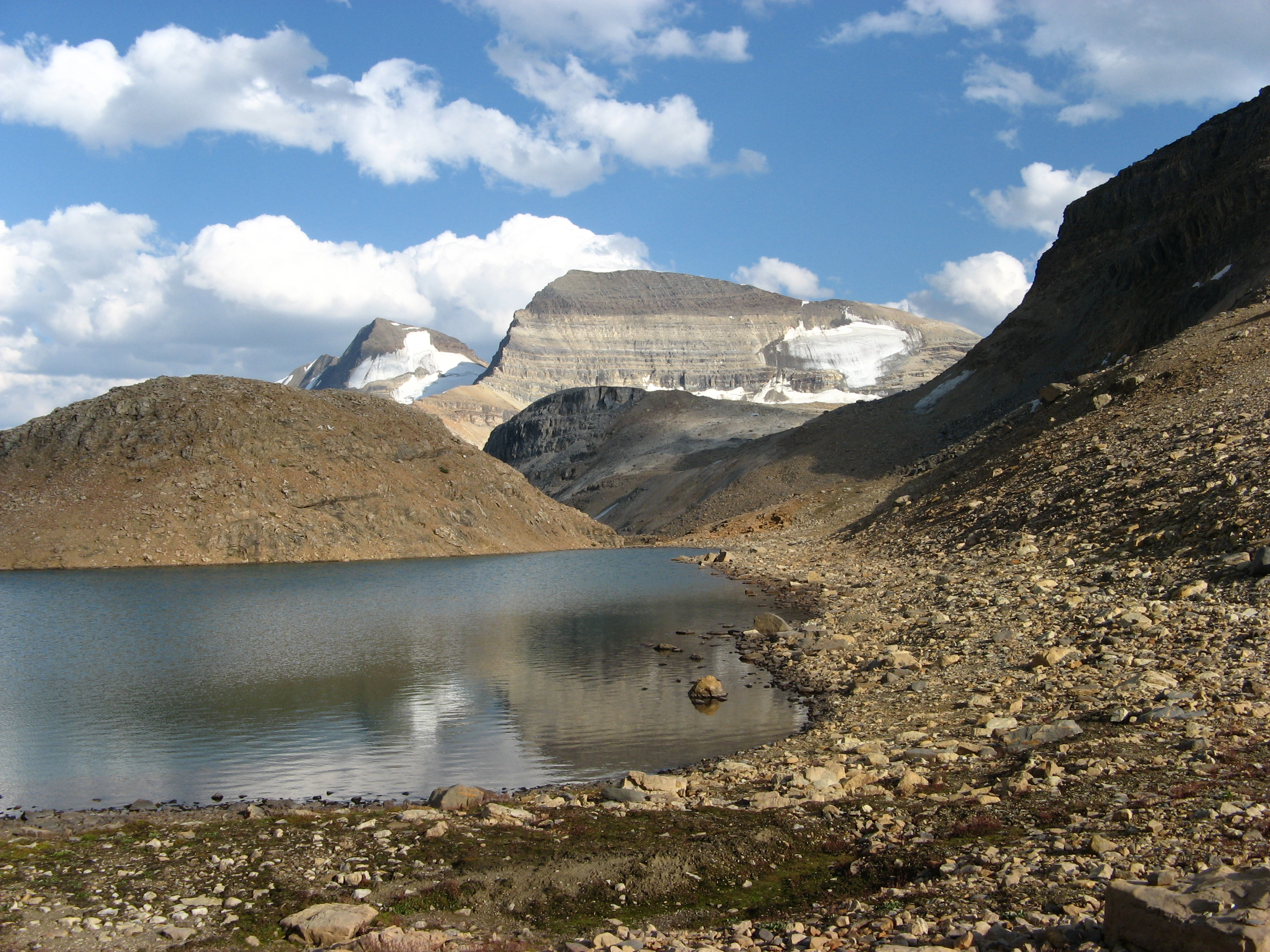
Kiwetinok Lake

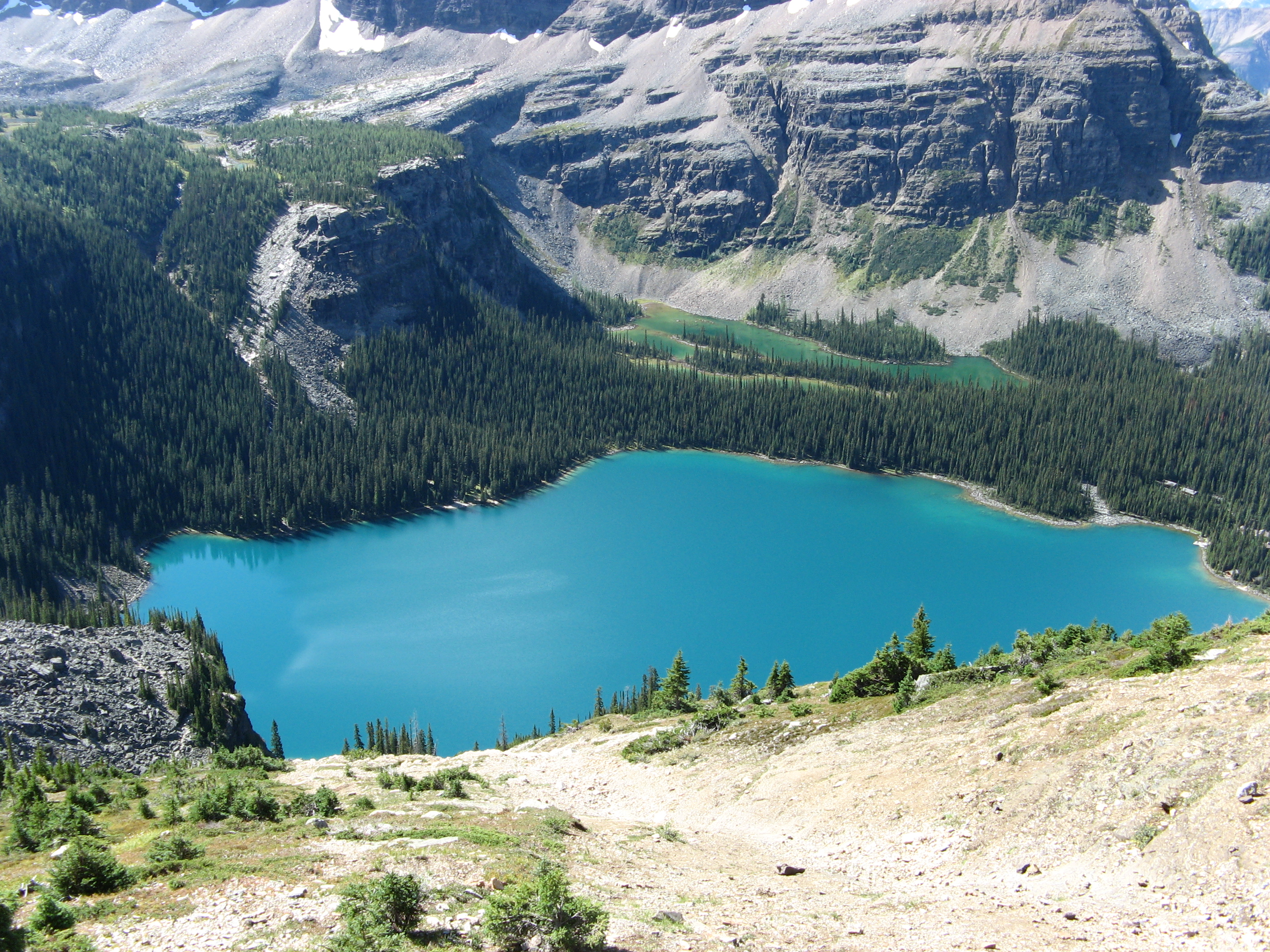
Lake O'Hara

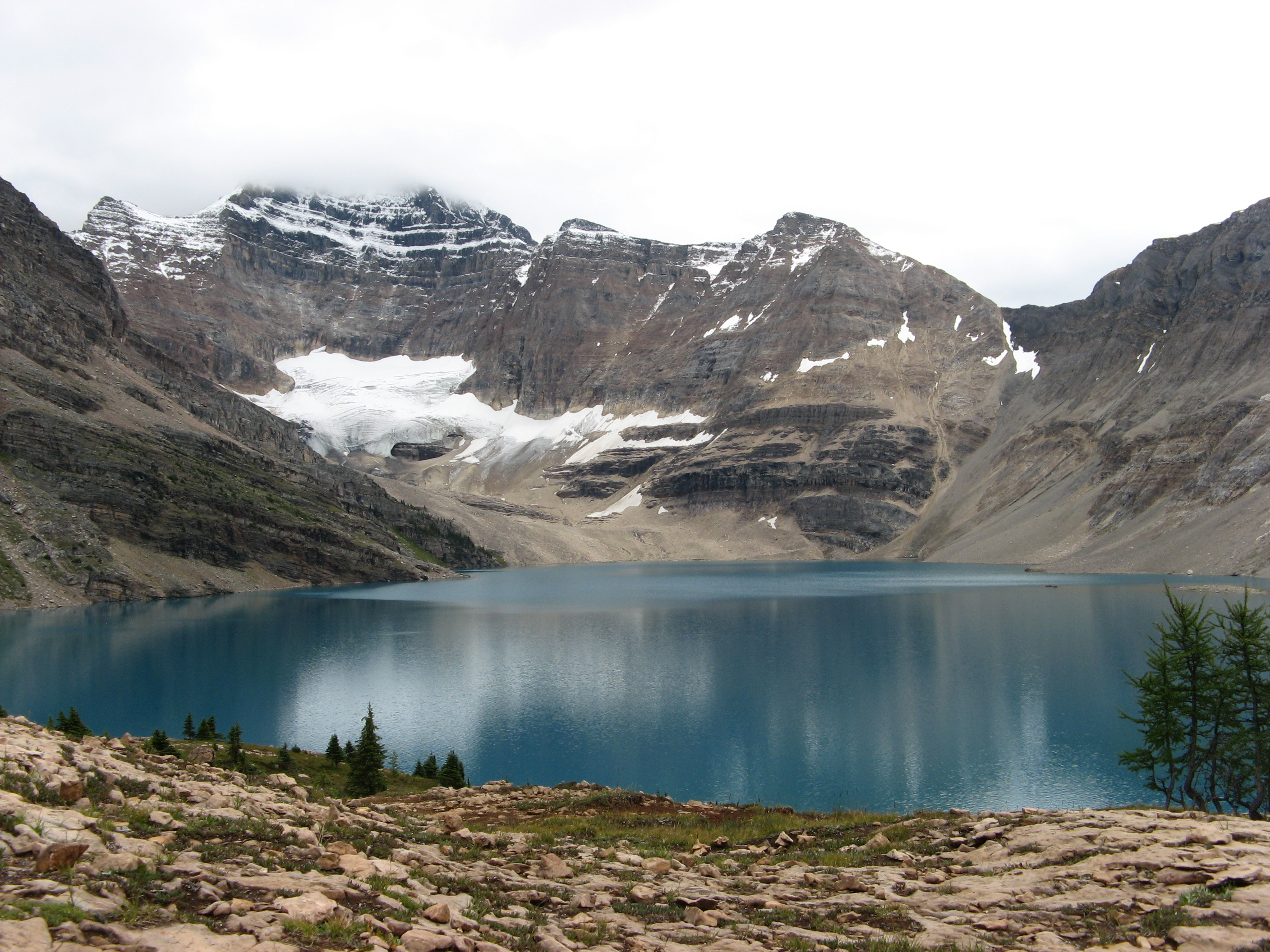
Lake McArthur

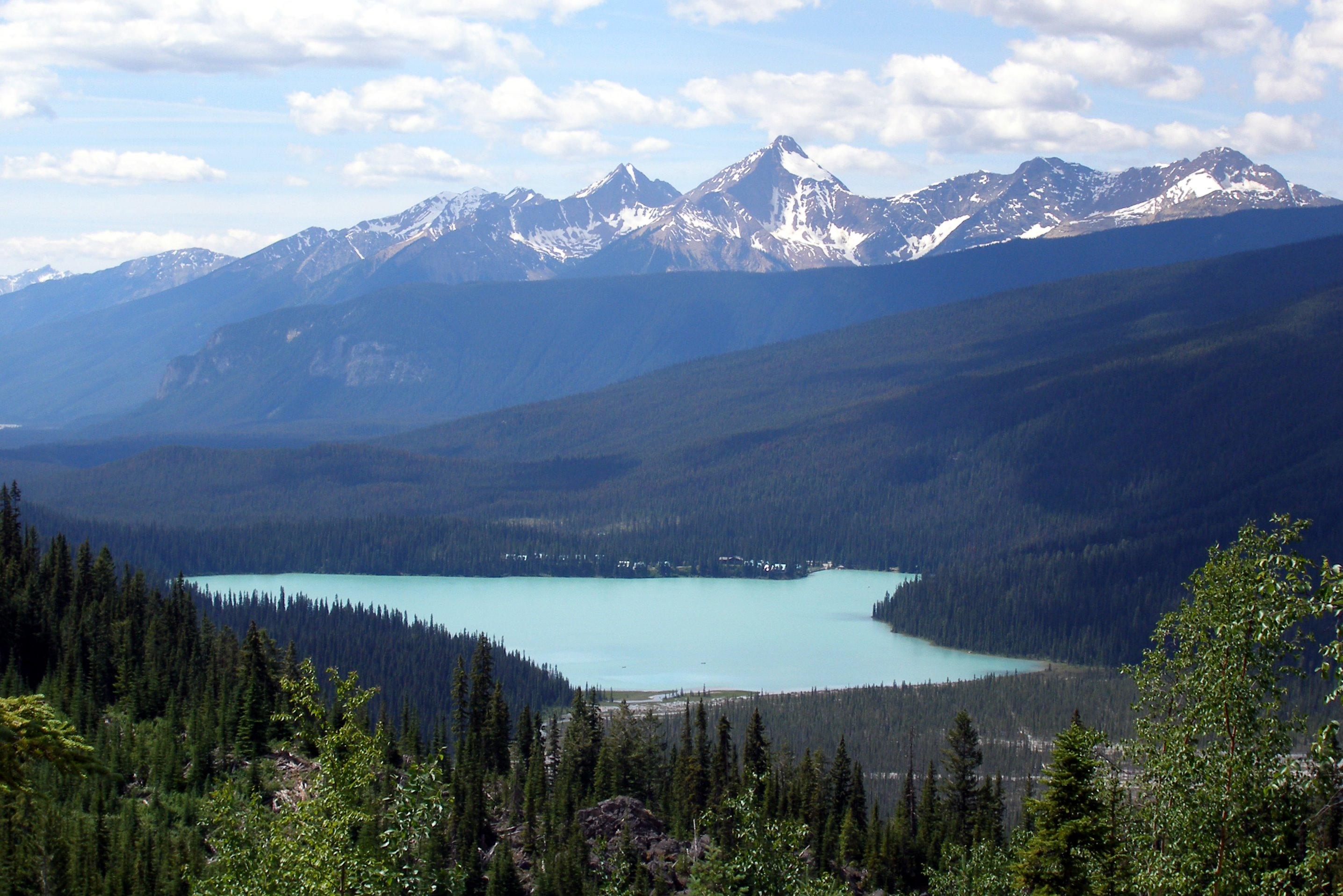
Emerald Lake
