= Mount Hector (Alberta) =

Mountain in Banff National Park, Alberta, Canada

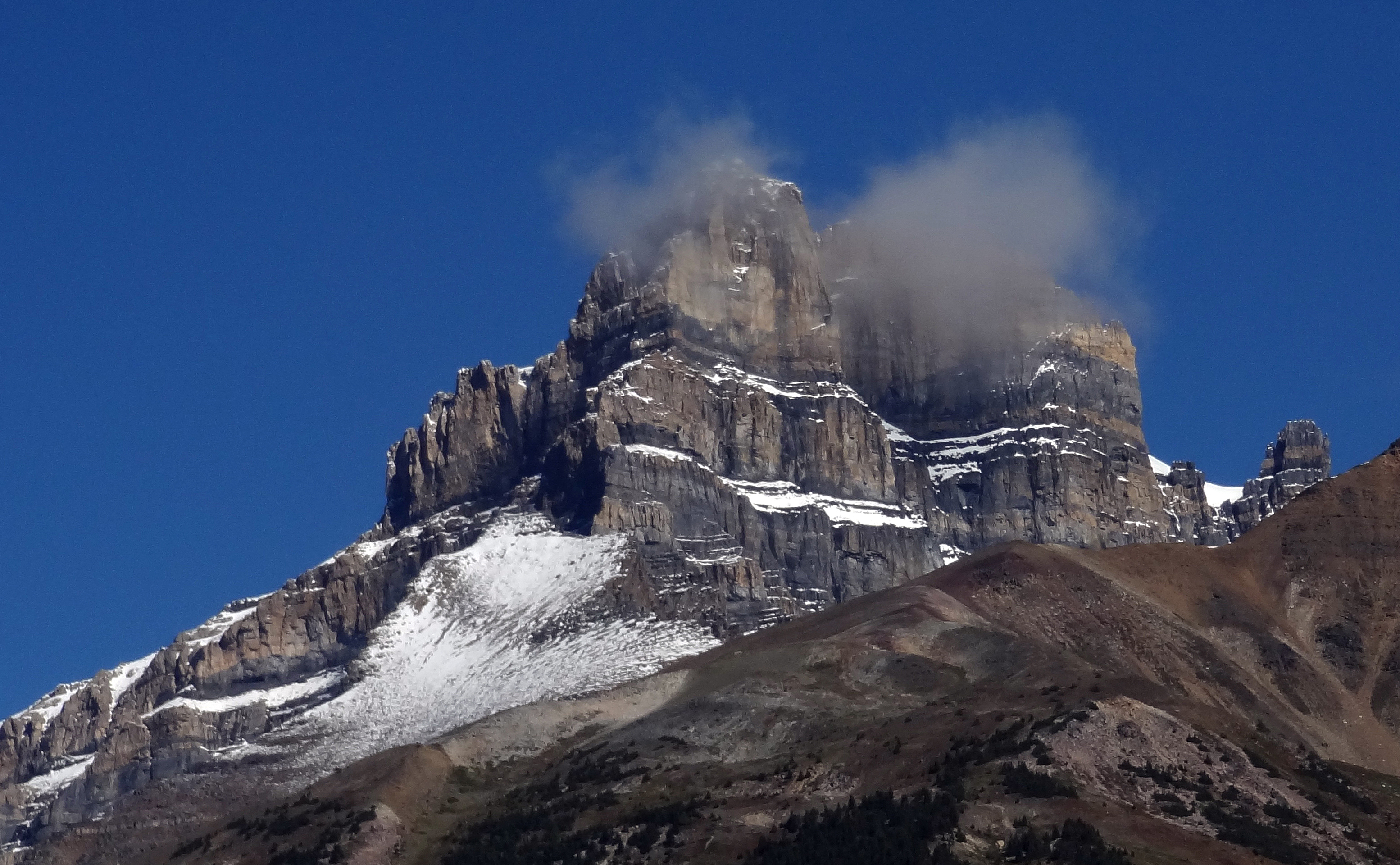
- Mt. Hector as seen from the Icefields Parkway

Highest point
- Elevation: 3,394 m (11,135 ft)
- Prominence: 1,759 m (5,771 ft) (Kicking Horse Pass)
- Parent peak: Mount Victoria
- Listing: Mountains of Alberta; Canada highest major peaks 47th; Canada prominent peaks 65th
- Coordinates: 51°34′30″N 116°15′34″W

Geography
- Location within Alberta Location within Canada
- Interactive map of Mount Hector
- Country: Canada
- Province: Alberta
- Protected area: Banff National Park
- Parent range: Murchison Group
- Topo map: NTS 82N9 Hector Lake

Geology
- Rock age: Cambrian
- Rock type: Sedimentary rock

Climbing
- First ascent: 1895
- Easiest route: rock/snow/glacier climb

Mount Hector is a 3,394-metre (11,135-foot) mountain summit located in the Bow River valley of Banff National Park, in the Canadian Rockies of Alberta, Canada. The mountain was named in 1884 by George M. Dawson after James Hector, a geologist on the Palliser expedition. The mountain is located beside the Icefields Parkway, 17 km (11 mi) north of Lake Louise.

The first ascent was made in 1895 by Philip S. Abbot, Charles Fay and Charles S. Thompson.

== Geology ==
Like other mountains in Banff Park, Mount Hector is composed of sedimentary rock laid down during the Precambrian to Jurassic periods. Formed in shallow seas, this sedimentary rock was pushed east and over the top of younger rock during the Laramide orogeny. The summit down to the base of cliffs is composed of Cathedral limestone and dolostone of the middle Cambrian period while the slopes below are of middle Cambrian Gog Group quartzite.

== Climate ==
Based on the Köppen climate classification, Mount Hector is located in a subarctic climate with cold, snowy winters, and mild summers. Temperatures can drop below −20 °C with wind chill factors below −30 °C. Precipitation runoff from Mount Hector drains into tributaries of the Bow River.

== Gallery ==
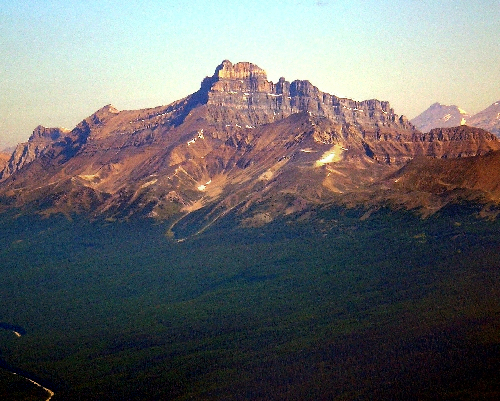
Mount Hector from Fairview Mountain

== See also ==
- List of ultras of North America
- Mountain peaks of Canada
- List of mountain peaks of North America
- List of mountain peaks of the Rocky Mountains
- Rocky Mountains
