= Peter Sarbach =

Swiss mountain guide (1844 – 1930)

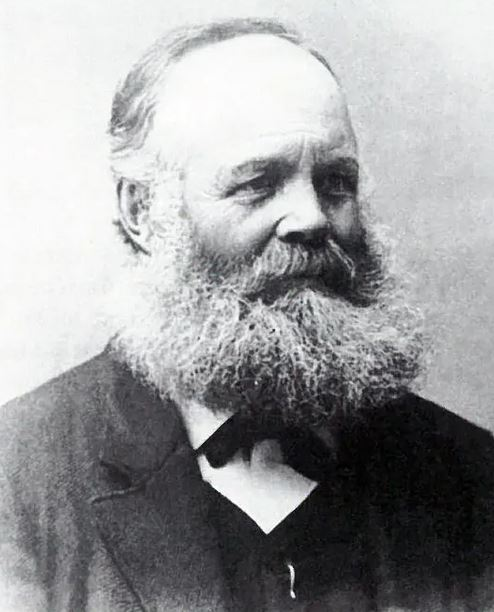
- Born: 1844; St. Niklaus, Switzerland
- Died: 1930 (aged 85–86)

Peter Sarbach (1844–1930) was a pioneer mountain guide from St. Niklaus in Switzerland, near the village of Zermatt. He became notable as a guide in Switzerland, so much so that he was invited to Canada in 1887, becoming the first Swiss guide to work in the Canadian Rockies and helped to establish the need for guiding skills in the area.

== Mountain guide ==
In 1864, Peter Sarbach was a porter for Sir Edward Whymper in one of his attempts to ascend the Matterhorn. He later became a mountain guide in the Swiss Alps and surrounding area. The guiding skills of Peter Sarbach became well regarded. At age 53, he was invited to Canada for an 1897 first ascent expedition of Mt. Lefroy, and hence he became the first Swiss guide to work in the Canadian Rockies.

== Canadian legacy ==
The guiding skills of Peter Sarbach were commissioned, in a roundabout way, at the request of Edwin Hale Abbot, the father of Philip Stanley Abbot. Hence, together with John Norman Collie, Professor Harold Baily Dixon, George Percival Baker, Professor Charles Ernest Fay, and others, Peter Sarbach lead a memorial first ascent of Mt. Lefroy on 3 August 1897, exactly one year after the tragic death of his son, Philip Stanley Abbot. See Abbot Pass hut. Peter Sarbach further guided 1897 expeditions to a first ascent of Victoria Mountain, Mt. Gordon, and Mt. Sarbach (Mt. Sarbach named on his behalf).

Peter Sarbach returned to his home in Switzerland in the fall of 1897, and never returned to Canada; so his prominence faded somewhat. However, the impression he left, from his 1897 expeditions, would set the pace for Swiss Mountaineering influence in Canada. His exploits confirmed the need for competent mountaineering skills and influenced the 1898 invitations to Swiss guides Edouard (Edward) Feuz Sr. and Christian Haesler Sr.
