= Mount Lefroy =

Mountain in Alberta/BC, Canada

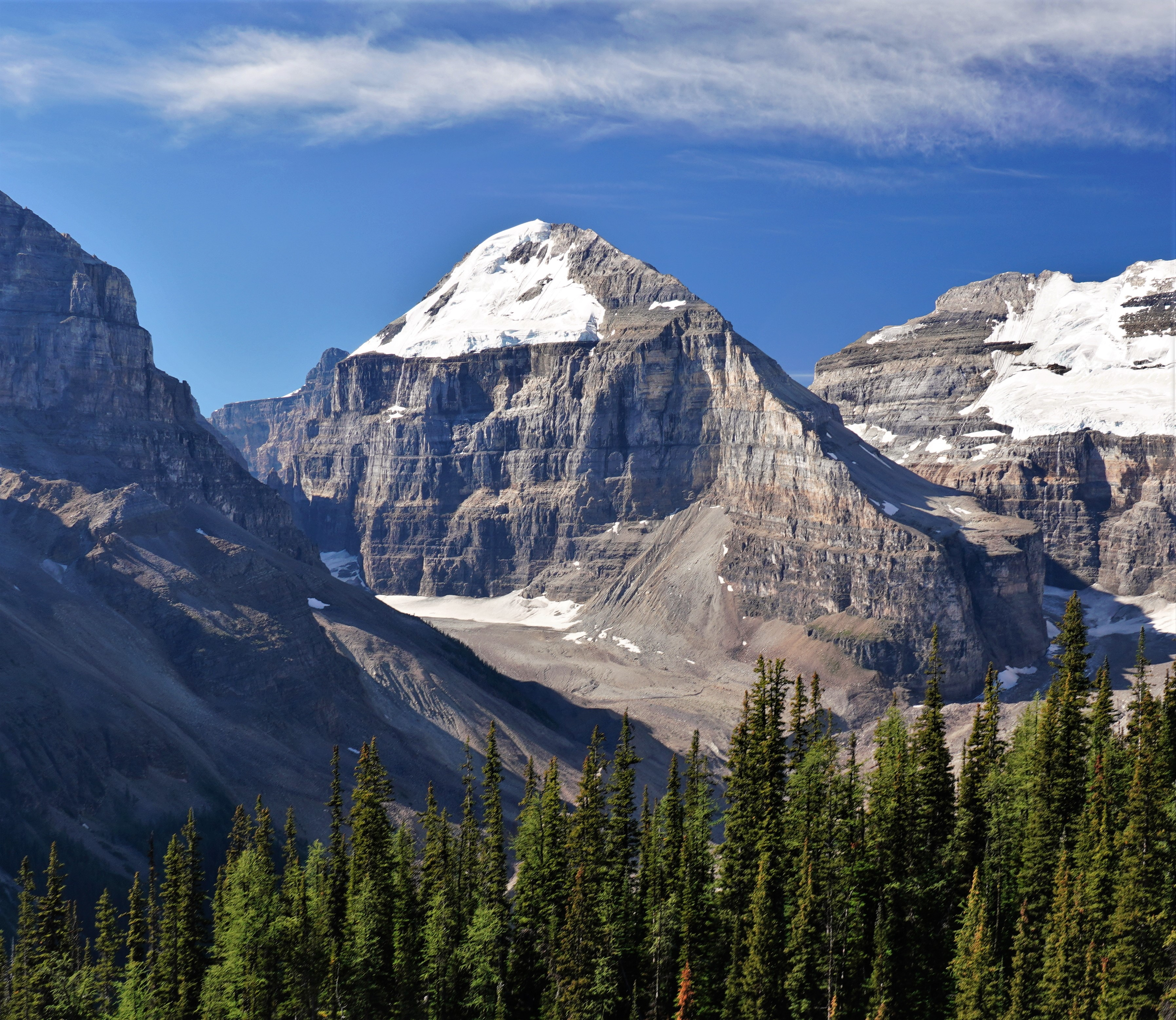
- Mount Lefroy

Highest point
- Elevation: 3,423 m (11,230 ft)
- Prominence: 417 m (1,368 ft)
- Listing: Mountains of Alberta; Mountains of British Columbia
- Coordinates: 51°21′44″N 116°16′47″W

Geography
- Location within Alberta Location within British Columbia Location within Canada
- Interactive map of Mount Lefroy
- Country: Canada
- Provinces: Alberta and British Columbia
- Protected areas: Banff National Park; Yoho National Park
- Parent range: Bow Range ← Park Ranges
- Topo map: NTS 82N8 Lake Louise

Climbing
- First ascent: 1897
- Easiest route: West face (UIAA II)

Mount Lefroy is a mountain on the Continental Divide, at the border of Alberta and British Columbia in western Canada. The mountain is located on the eastern side of Abbot Pass which separates Lake Louise in Banff National Park from Lake O'Hara in Yoho National Park. Mount Victoria lies immediately on the western side of the pass.

The mountain was named by James Hector in 1858 for Sir John Henry Lefroy (1817–1890), an astronomer who had travelled over 8,800 kilometres (5,470 mi) in Canada's north between 1842 and 1844 making meteorological and magnetic observations. (Note: "Canadian Mountain Place Names" states that James Hector named this mountain in 1858 while cdnrockiesdatabases.ca says it was George M. Dawson in 1894.)

The mountain is the site of the first fatal accident in modern mountaineering in Canada. In 1896 during a failed summit bid, Philip Stanley Abbot slipped on rocks after just coming off an icy section and plummeted down the rock face to his death.

The first successful ascent was made in 1897 by J. Norman Collie, Arthur Michael, H. Dixon; Charles Fay, Peter Sarbach, R. Vanderlip, C. Noyes, Charles Thompson, and H. Parker.

A prominent painting by Canadian Group of 7 artist Lawren Harris, was painted at this site.

== Geology ==
Mount Lefroy is composed of sedimentary rock laid down during the Cambrian period. Formed in shallow seas, this sedimentary rock was pushed east and over the top of younger rock during the Laramide orogeny.

== Climate ==
Based on the Köppen climate classification, Mount Lefroy is located in a subarctic climate zone with cold, snowy winters, and mild summers. Winter temperatures can drop below −20 °C with wind chill factors below −30 °C.

== Gallery ==
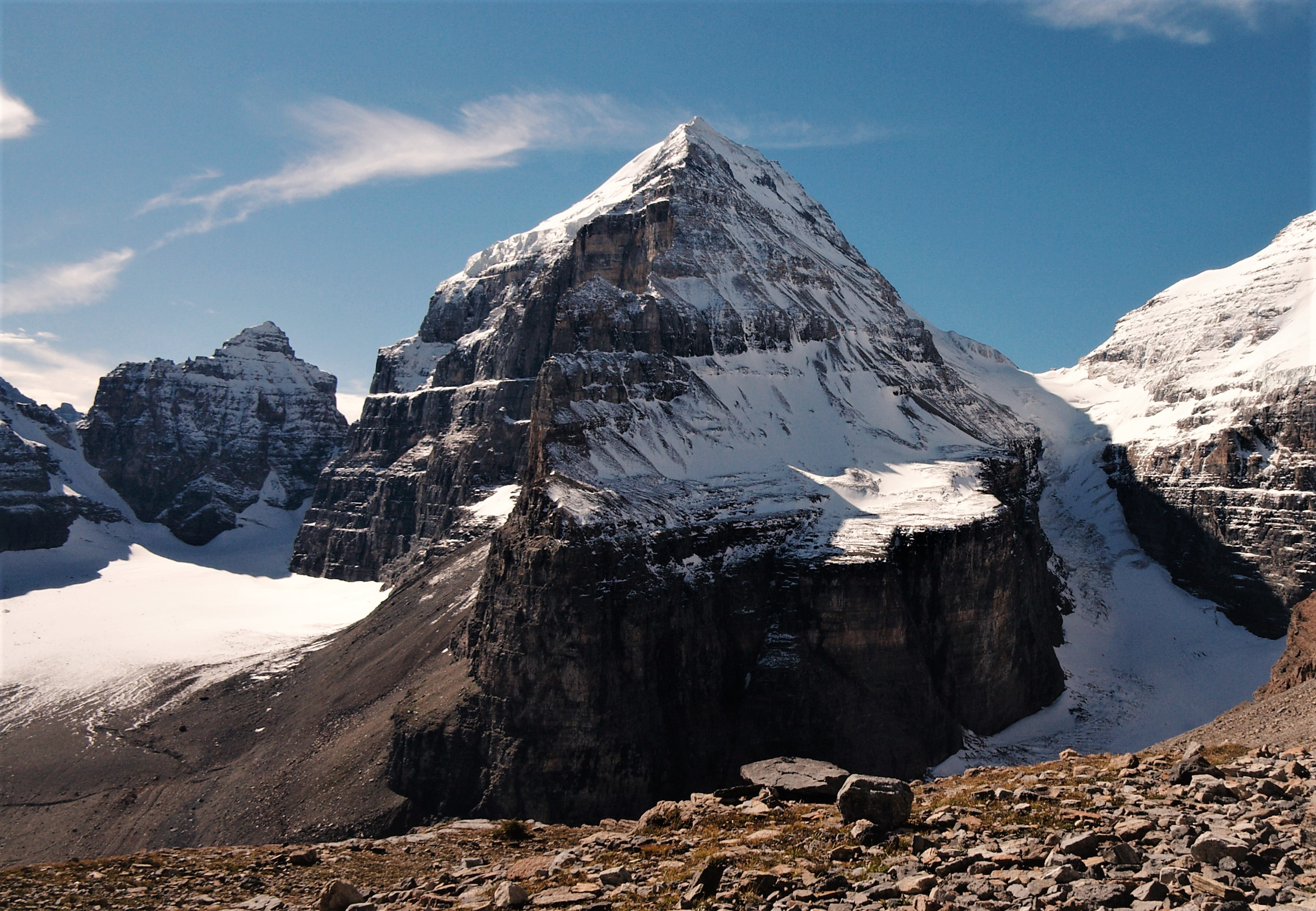
North aspect, with The Mitre to left

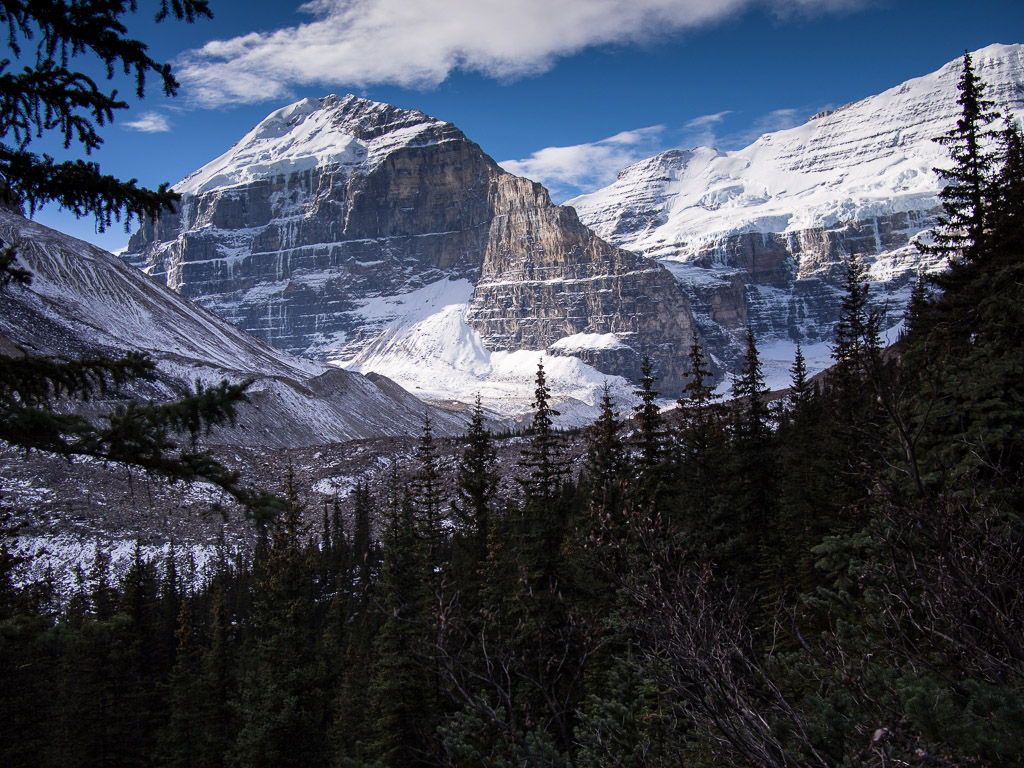
Northeast aspect

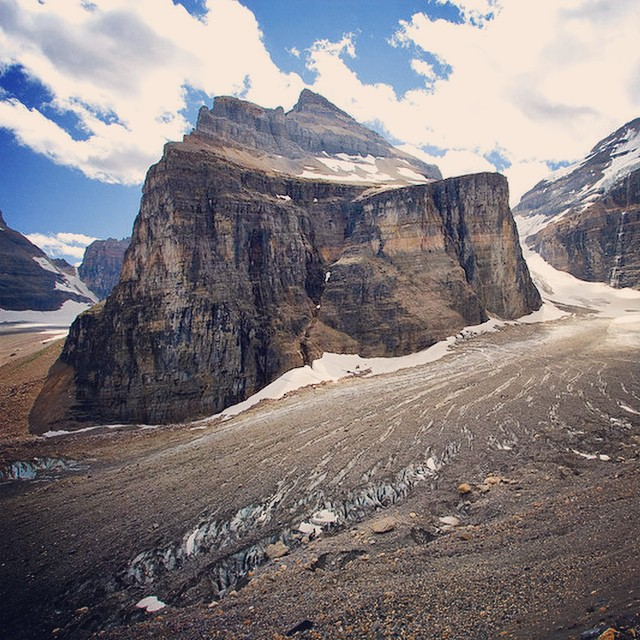
Mount Lefroy north aspect, and Victoria Glacier

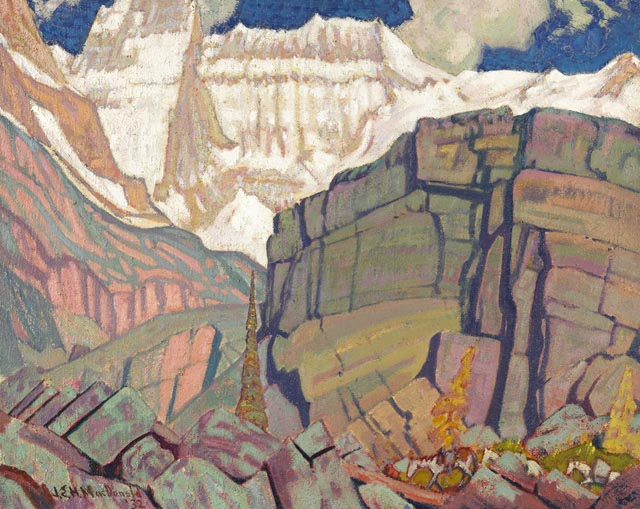
J. E. H. MacDonald, Mount Lefroy (1932), National Gallery of Canada, Ottawa

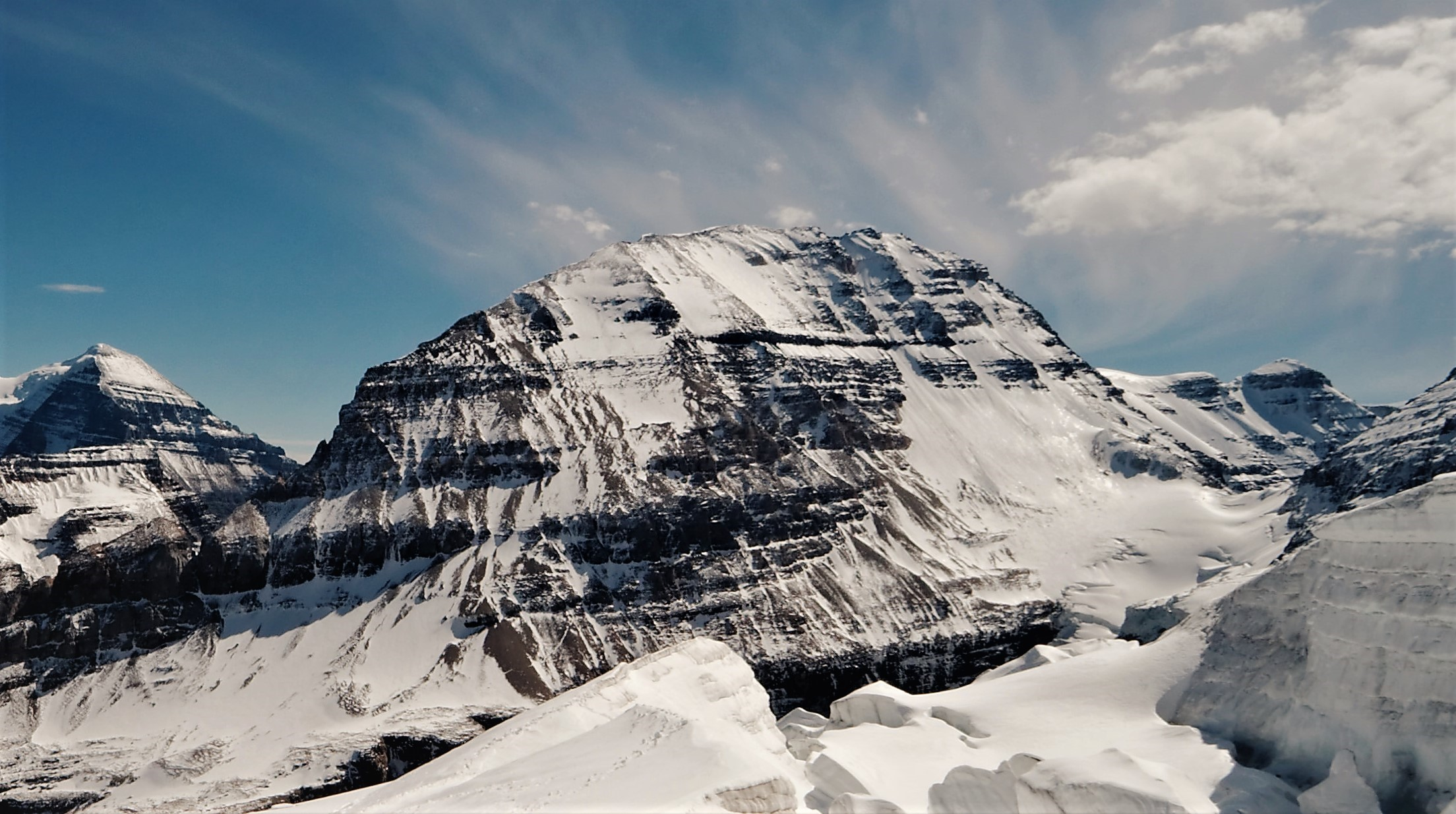
Northwest aspect

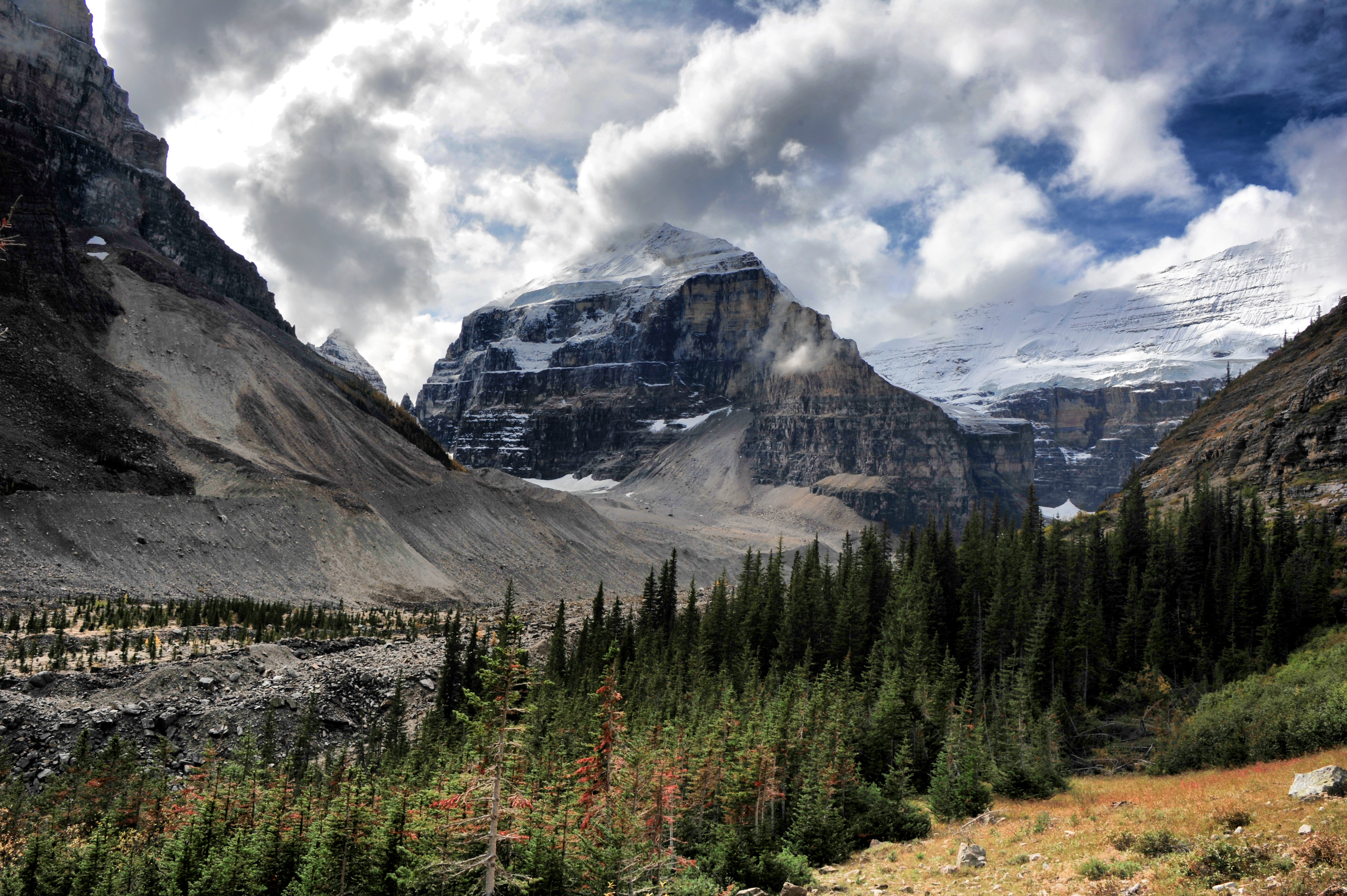

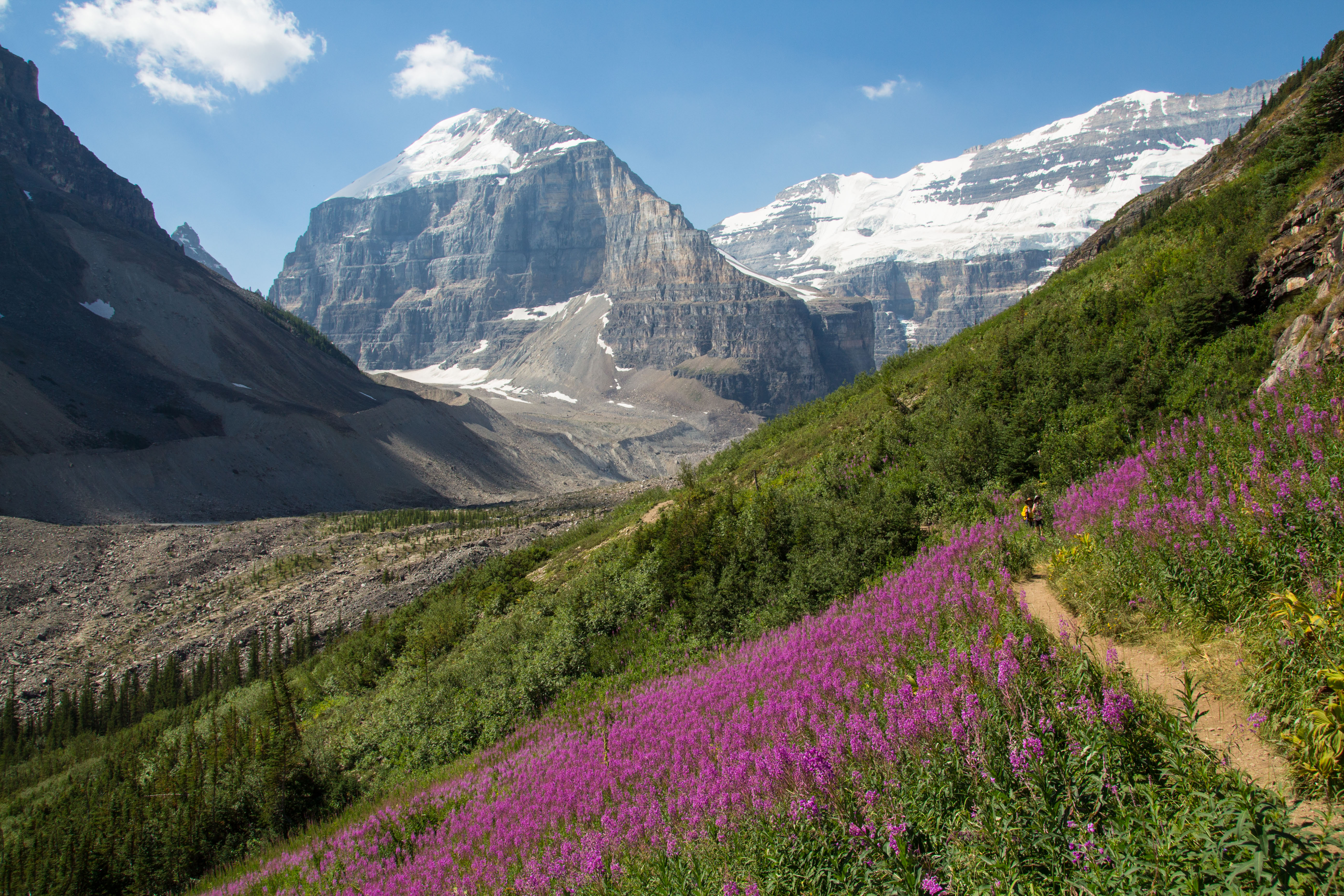
Mt. Lefroy and Mt. Victoria (right)

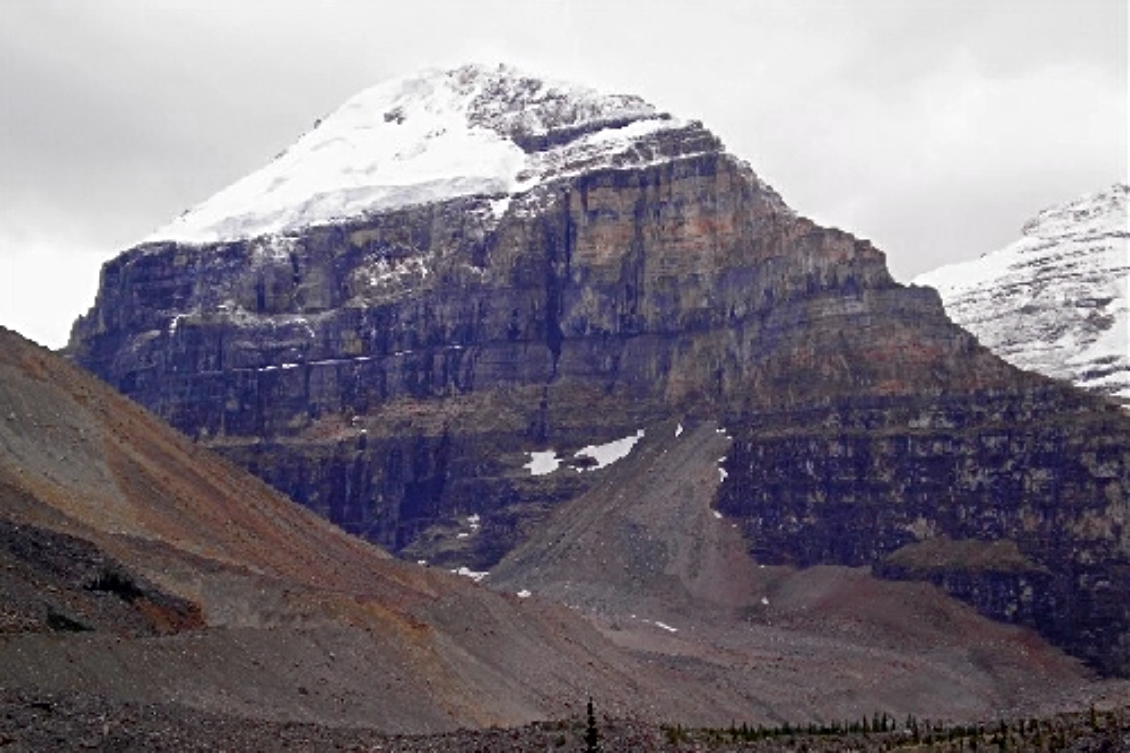
