= Plain of Six Glaciers Tea House =

Coordinates: 51.3936°N 116.2726°W

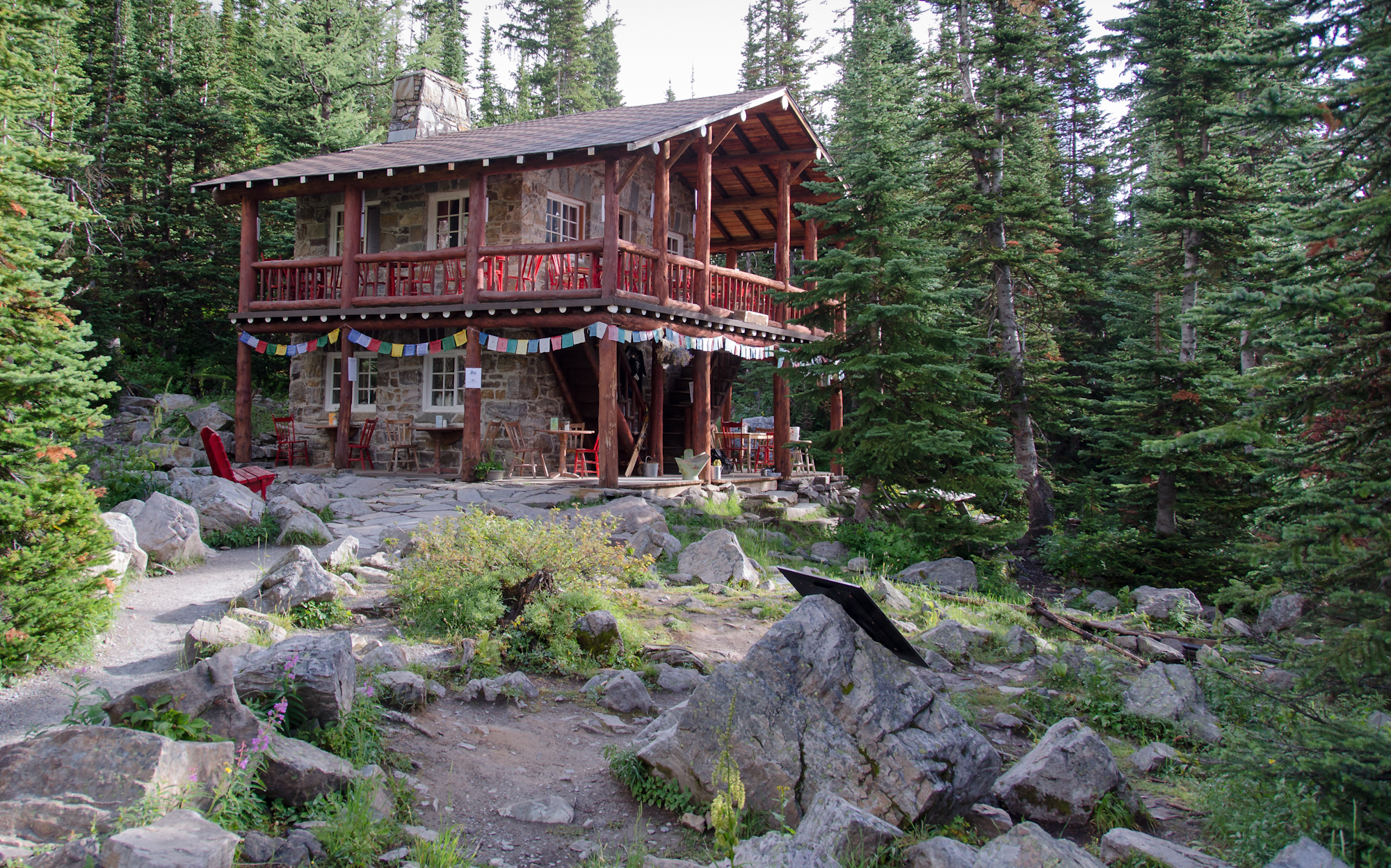
The Plain of Six Glaciers Tea House

The Plain of Six Glaciers Tea House is situated on its namesake near Lake Louise, Alberta, Canada.

== History ==
The Plain of Six Glaciers Tea House was built by the Canadian Pacific Railway (CPR) in 1924. The idea was suggested by Edward Feuz, a CPR Swiss Guide, as a rest stop for guests on their way to the Abbot Pass Hut. The main structure is a two-story stone building surrounded by wooden verandas that serves as the tea house. Three surrounding cabins that were built in 1927 once served overnight guests but now only house staff. The CPR invested $2,500 to build the establishment and licensed it to the Feuz family for operation. When the CPR began to sell or demolish all of their backcountry lodges in the 1950s, they hung on to the tea house until 1960. The tea house is now owned and run by Joy Kimball.
