= Mount Abbott =

Mount Abbott may refer to:

- Mount Abbott (Antarctica) 1,020 metres (3,350 ft)
- Mount Abbott (British Columbia) 2,465 metres (8,087 ft)
- Mount Sir John Abbott, after the second Prime Minister of Canada, Sir John Abbott (d. 1893).

== See also ==
- Mount Abbot in California, USA
