= The Mitre (Alberta) =

Mountain in Banff NP, Alberta, Canada

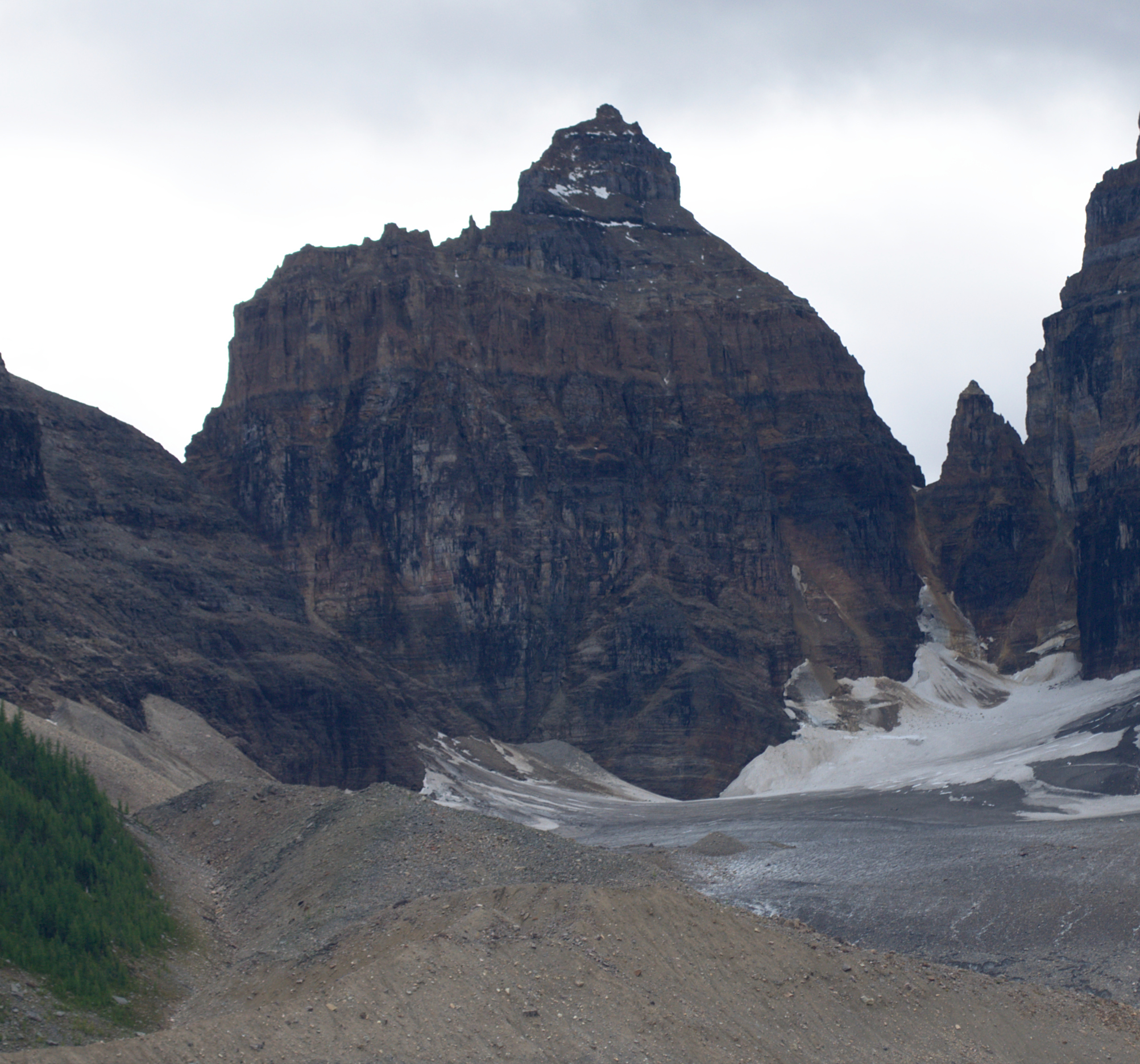
- The Mitre and Lefroy Glacier

Highest point
- Elevation: 2,850 m (9,350 ft)
- Prominence: 229 m (751 ft)
- Parent peak: Mount Lefroy (3423 m)
- Listing: Mountains of Alberta
- Coordinates: 51°21′48″N 116°15′44″W

Geography
- Location within Alberta Location within Canada
- Country: Canada
- Province: Alberta
- Protected area: Banff National Park
- Parent range: Bow Range
- Topo map: NTS 82N8 Lake Louise

Geology
- Rock age: Cambrian
- Rock type: Sedimentary rock

Climbing
- First ascent: 1901 C. Kaufmann; J. Pollinger; G. Collier; E. Tewes; G. Bohren

The Mitre is a 2,850-metre (9,350-foot) mountain summit located in the Lake Louise area of Banff National Park, in the Canadian Rockies of Alberta, Canada. Its nearest higher peak is Mount Lefroy, 1.0 km (0.62 mi) to the west. Mount Aberdeen is 2.0 km (1.2 mi) to the north-northeast, Lefroy Glacier immediately north, Mitre Glacier southwest, and Paradise Valley to the southeast.

== History ==
The Mitre was named in 1893 by Samuel E.S. Allen presumably because the mountain resembles a Bishop's mitre.

The first ascent of the peak was made in 1901 by Christian Kaufmann, J. Pollinger, G. Collier, E. Tewes, and G. Bohren.

The mountain's name was officially adopted in 1952 by the Geographical Names Board of Canada.

== Geology ==
Like other mountains in Banff Park, The Mitre is composed of sedimentary rock laid down during the Precambrian to Jurassic periods. Formed in shallow seas, this sedimentary rock was pushed east and over the top of younger rock during the Laramide orogeny.

== Climate ==
Based on the Köppen climate classification, The Mitre is located in a subarctic climate zone with cold, snowy winters, and mild summers. Winter temperatures can drop below −20 °C with wind chill factors below −30 °C.

== Gallery ==
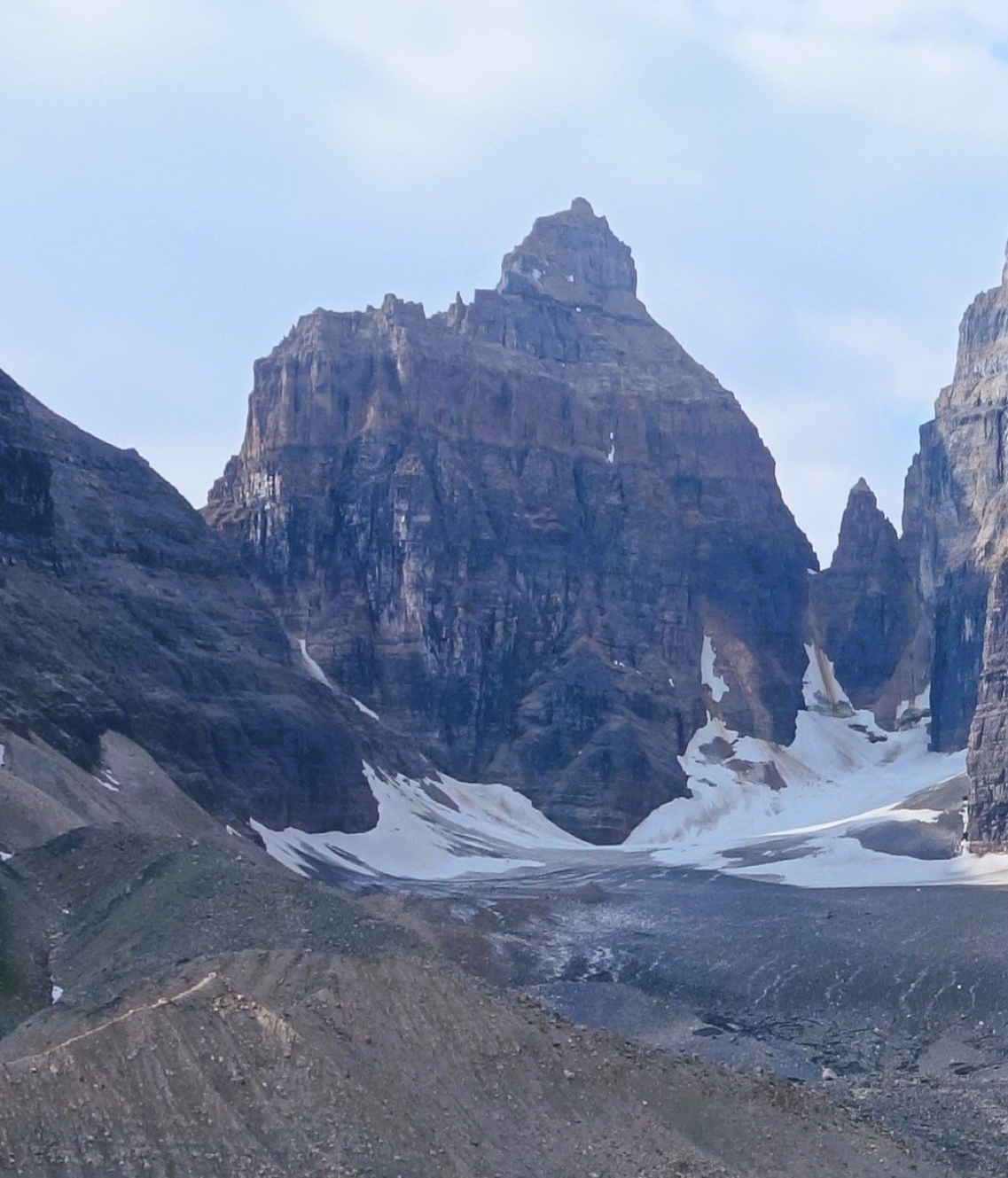
The Mitre

== See also ==
- Geography of Alberta
