= Mount Afton =

Mountain in British Columbia, Canada

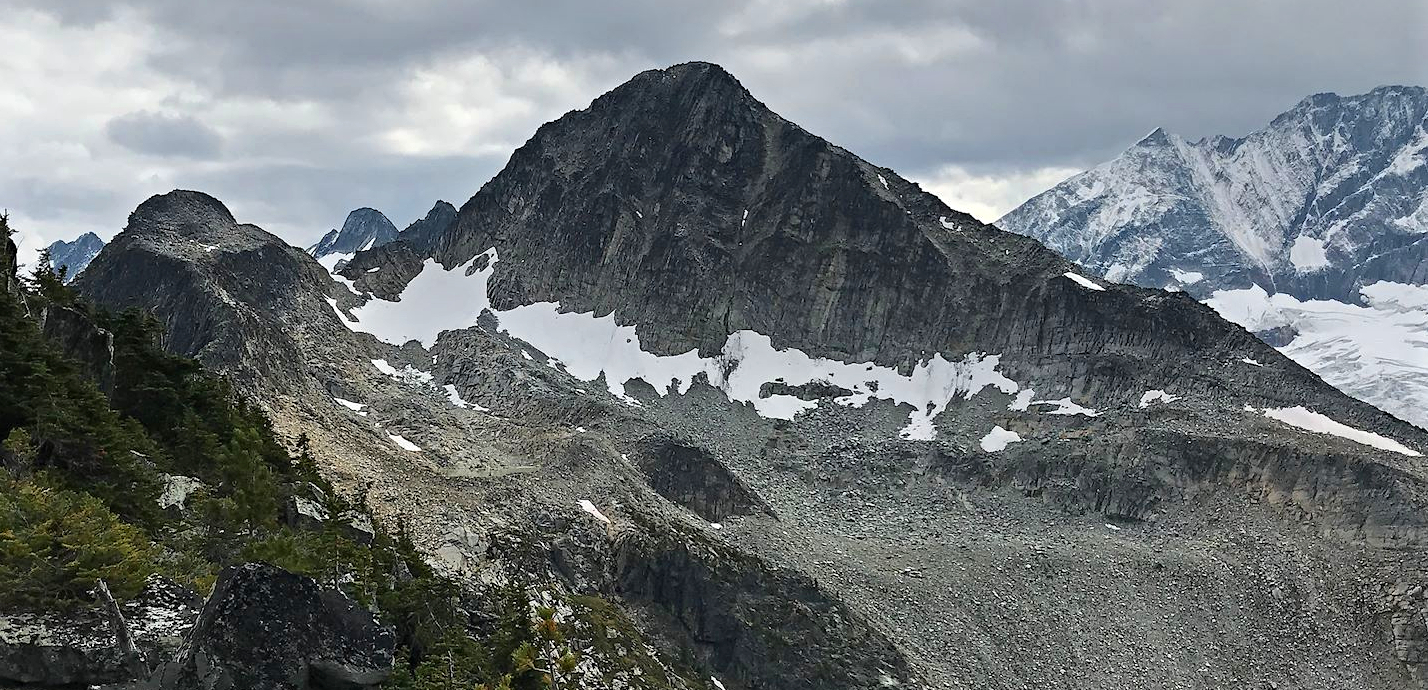
- Mount Afton, north aspect

Highest point
- Elevation: 2,553 m (8,376 ft)
- Prominence: 171 m (561 ft)
- Parent peak: Mount Jupiter (2786 m)
- Listing: Mountains of British Columbia
- Coordinates: 51°14′08″N 117°30′50″W

Geography
- Location within British Columbia Location within Canada
- Interactive map of Mount Afton
- Location: Glacier National Park; British Columbia, Canada
- District: Kootenay Land District
- Parent range: Duncan Ranges → Selkirk Mountains
- Topo map: NTS 82N4 Illecillewaet

Climbing
- First ascent: 1893 H. Lambert, Miss MacLeod, H. Perley, W. Rau, W. Stables
- Easiest route: YDS 2-4 Scramble

Mount Afton is a 2,553-metre (8,376-foot) mountain summit located in Glacier National Park in the Selkirk Mountains of British Columbia, Canada. It is situated near the north end of Asulkan Ridge, 8 km (5.0 mi) south of Rogers Pass, 56 km (35 mi) northeast of Revelstoke, and 40 km (25 mi) west of Golden.

The first ascent of the mountain was made in 1893 by Herbert Lambert, Miss MacLeod, Harold A. Perley, William H. Rau, and William Stables via the east buttress.

The mountain was climbed in 1895 via the south ridge by Philip Stanley Abbot, Charles Ernest Fay, and Charles S. Thompson who named the mountain after themselves using an amalgamation of letters from their surnames, ("A"bbot "F"ay "T"homps"on").

The mountain's name was officially adopted March 31, 1924, when approved by the Geographical Names Board of Canada.

== Climate ==
Based on the Köppen climate classification, Mount Afton is located in a subarctic climate zone with cold, snowy winters, and mild summers. Temperatures can drop below −20 °C with wind chill factors below −30 °C. Precipitation runoff from the mountain drains north into the Illecillewaet River.

== See also ==
- Geography of British Columbia
