= Philip Stanley Abbot =

American lawyer (1867–1896)

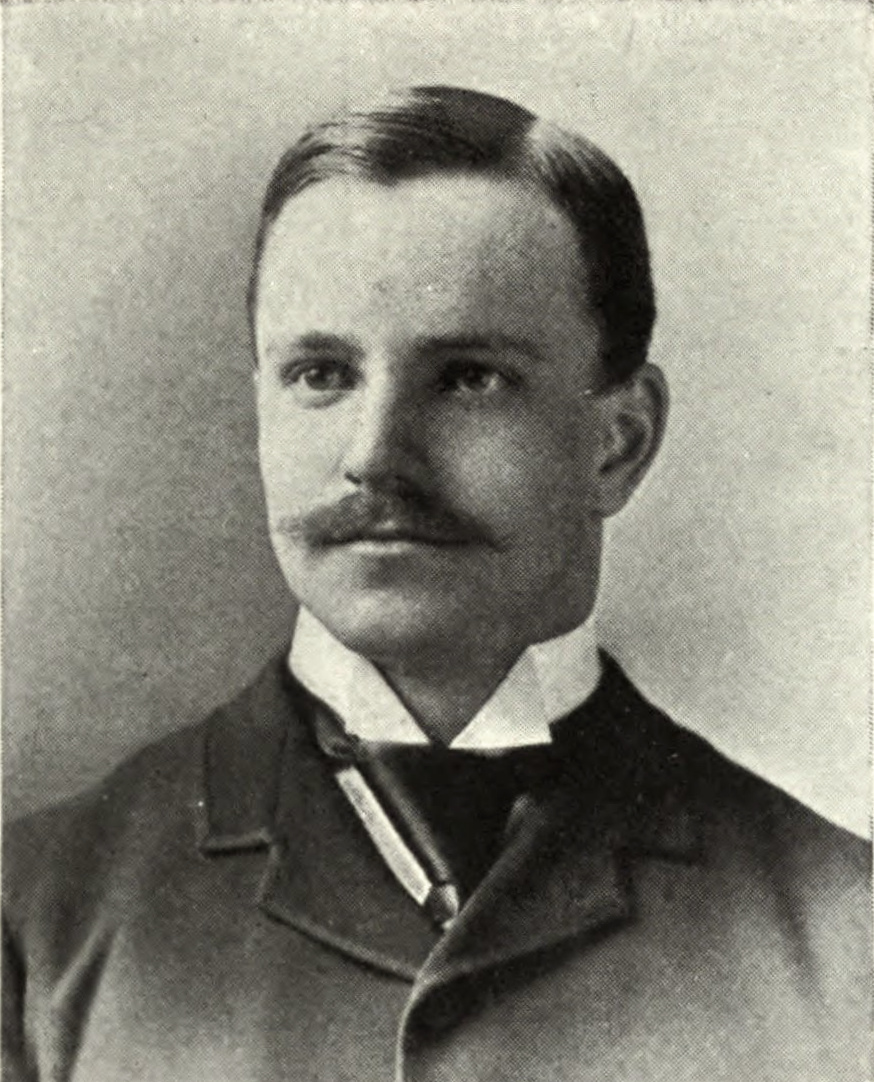
- Born: September 1, 1867; Brookline, Massachusetts, U.S.
- Died: August 3, 1896 (aged 28); Lake Louise, Alberta, Canada
- Cause of death: Trauma
- Resting place: Cambridge, Massachusetts, U.S.
- Occupation: Lawyer
- Years active: 1893–1896

Philip Stanley Abbot (September 1, 1867 – August 3, 1896) was an American lawyer who died while climbing Mount Lefroy. His death became the first recorded mountaineering fatality in North America.

== Biography ==
Abbot was a graduate of Harvard (1889), and of Harvard Law School (1893). He practiced law until 1894 with Samuel D. Warren II and Louis Brandeis of Boston. He then went to Milwaukee, where he was employed as assistant attorney for the Wisconsin Central Railroad (1871–99), of which his father, Edwin Hale Abbot, was president. The original family home was at 1 Follen Street, Cambridge, Massachusetts, the now renowned Edwin Abbot House, but the family in 1896 were at Bar Harbor, Maine.

== Mountaineer ==
Philip S. Abbot was considered an experienced mountain climber, in the United States; one who had made expeditions to the Alps and ascended the Matterhorn and Weisshorn; with Swiss guide Peter Sarbach. In 1893, Philip S. Abbot published, "An Ascent of the Weisshorn".

In 1895, with Professor Charles Ernest Fay of Tufts College, and Charles Sproull Thompson, General Agent for the Illinois Central Railroad, the three climbers failed in two ascents of Mount Lefroy in the Bow Range near Lake Louise, Alberta; but managed to make the first Ascent of Mt. Hector. The next year, Professor George Little, Librarian of Bowdoin joined the trio for the 1896 Expedition.

== Catastrophe and death ==
On August 3, 1896, Philip Stanley Abbot slipped from the rock precipice while free climbing Mount Lefroy in the Bow Range near Lake Louise, Alberta, Canada. As described by Charles E. Fay, "The unfortunate Philip S. Abbot fell past us and landed within 15 feet; while tumbling the remaining distance, to a rocky projection, one thousand feet below our perch". It took the three survivors most of the afternoon to descend to where the body rested; each depending on their own skill with an ice axe for safety. Upon their arrival, Mr. Abbot was still breathing but unable to speak; and he died soon thereafter. As it was impossible to carry the body down the slippery descent the party was compelled to leave the body, and return the next Thursday with a recovery party.

The recovery party was led by outfitter Thomas Edmonds Wilson and included George Little, Willoughby Astley, and Professor Charles Ernest Fay. The recovery party wrapped the body in several blankets and let it slide down 2000 feet to the foot of the mountain. The body was then put on its way to Cambridge.

== Memorial ==
In memory of the first mountaineering fatality in North America, the Pass, which took the life of Philip S. Abbot was named in his honor.

In 1922, Abbot Pass Hut was built between Mount Lefroy and Mount Victoria on the Continental Divide of Alberta and British Columbia. Declared a National Historic Site in 1992, the hut was demolished in June 2022 due to unrepairable structural issues.
