= Mount Abbott (British Columbia) =

Mountain in British Columbia, Canada

- Location within British Columbia Location within Canada
- Interactive map of Mount Abbott

Highest point
- Elevation: 2,465 m (8,087 ft)
- Prominence: 45 m (148 ft)
- Parent peak: Mount Afton (2553 m)
- Listing: Mountains of British Columbia
- Coordinates: 51°14′11″N 117°30′33″W

Geography
- Country: Canada
- Province: British Columbia
- Park: Glacier National Park
- District: Kootenay Land District
- Parent range: Selkirk Mountains
- Topo map: NTS 82N4 Illecillewaet

Climbing
- First ascent: 1888

Mount Abbott is a mountain in British Columbia, Canada, located within Glacier National Park. The peak is west of the Asulkan Creek drainage, near Rogers Pass. It is named for Harry Braithwaite Abbott, a superintendent of the Canadian Pacific Railway. The first ascent was made by William Spotswood Green and Henry Swanzy in 1888. The route is a relatively easy scramble.
