= Lake Oesa =

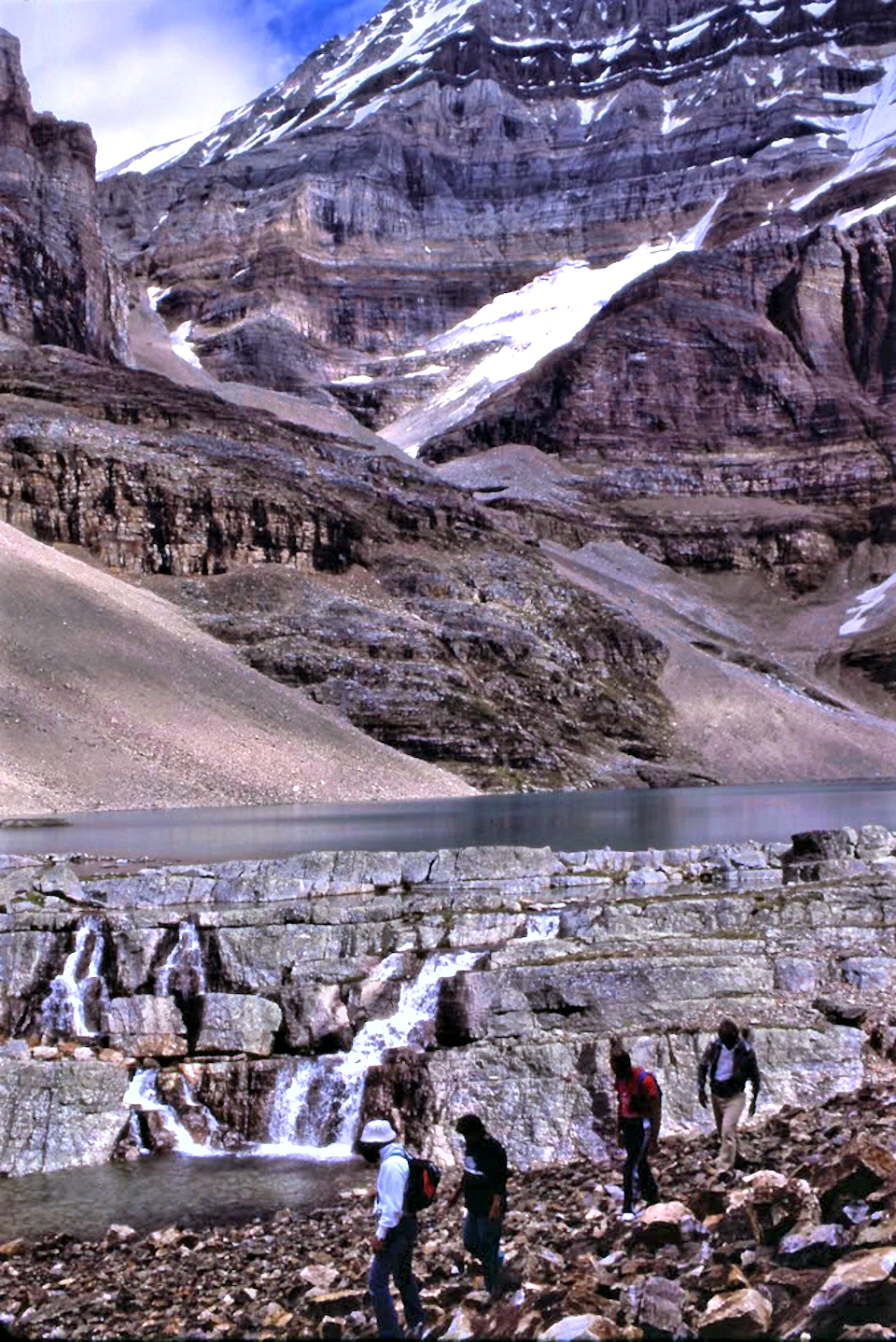
- Lake Oesa & the trail (backgd) to Abbot Pass

- Location within British Columbia
- Location: Yoho National Park, British Columbia, Canada
- Coordinates: 51.355°N 116.304°W
- Type: lake
- Surface elevation: 2,267 metres (7,438 ft)

Lake Oesa is a body of water located at an elevation of 2,267 metres (7,438 ft) in the mountains of Yoho National Park, near Field, British Columbia, Canada, while a trail at the far end of the lake leads to Abbot Pass.

The lake gets its name from a Stoney language (Native American language) term for 'corner'. It can be reached via a 3.2-kilometre (2.0 mi) climbing trail which starts at Lake O'Hara and ascends approximately 250 metres (820 ft). An alpine trail along the Yukness Ledges connects Lake Oesa to nearby Opabin Lake.

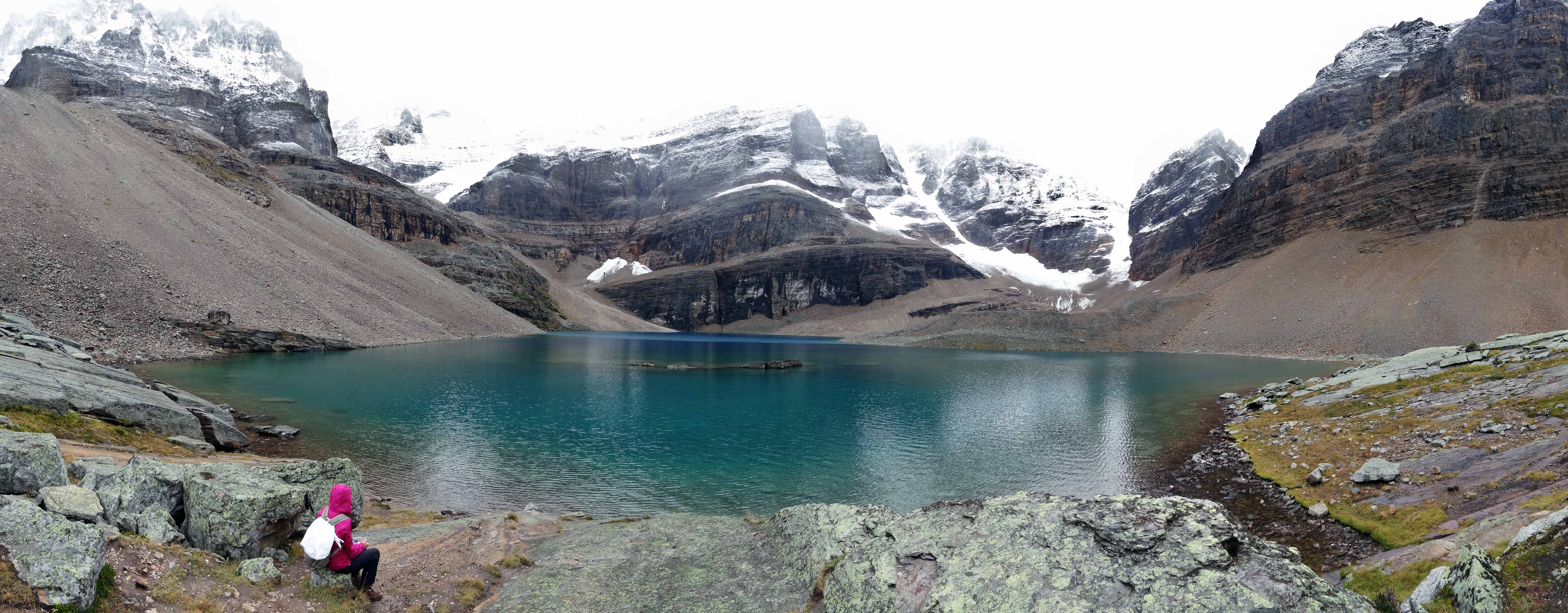
Lake Oesa, Yoho National Park, Canada

== See also ==
- List of lakes of British Columbia
