= Opabin Lake =

Lake in British Columbia, Canada

Coordinates: 51.341°N 116.312°W

Opabin Lake is a body of water located at an elevation of 2,277 metres (7,470 ft) in the mountains of Yoho National Park, near Field, British Columbia, Canada.

Opabin Lake can be accessed by two climbing trails, the East Opabin trail and the West Opabin trail, which form a 6 km circuit beginning and ending at Lake O'Hara. Both trails ascend approximately 250 metres (820 ft). East Opabin consists of switchbacks through the woods above Lake O'Hara followed by an uphill hike alongside a stream fed by runoff from the snowy peaks. West Opabin involves a somewhat more rugged ascent, where the mossy woods yield to scree, stone steps, and open rocky paths cut into the slopes that offer vistas of Lake O'Hara, Mary Lake, and the surrounding mountains. A third, alpine trail connects the East Opabin trail to nearby Lake Oesa.

== Opabin Plateau ==
Opabin Lake is the major feature on the Opabin Plateau, a hanging valley located above and southeast of Lake O'Hara. The plateau is crossed with trails and streams and dotted with small lakes and ponds. The area is inhabited by whistling hoary marmots, pikas, weasels, ground squirrels, and reclusive wolverines.

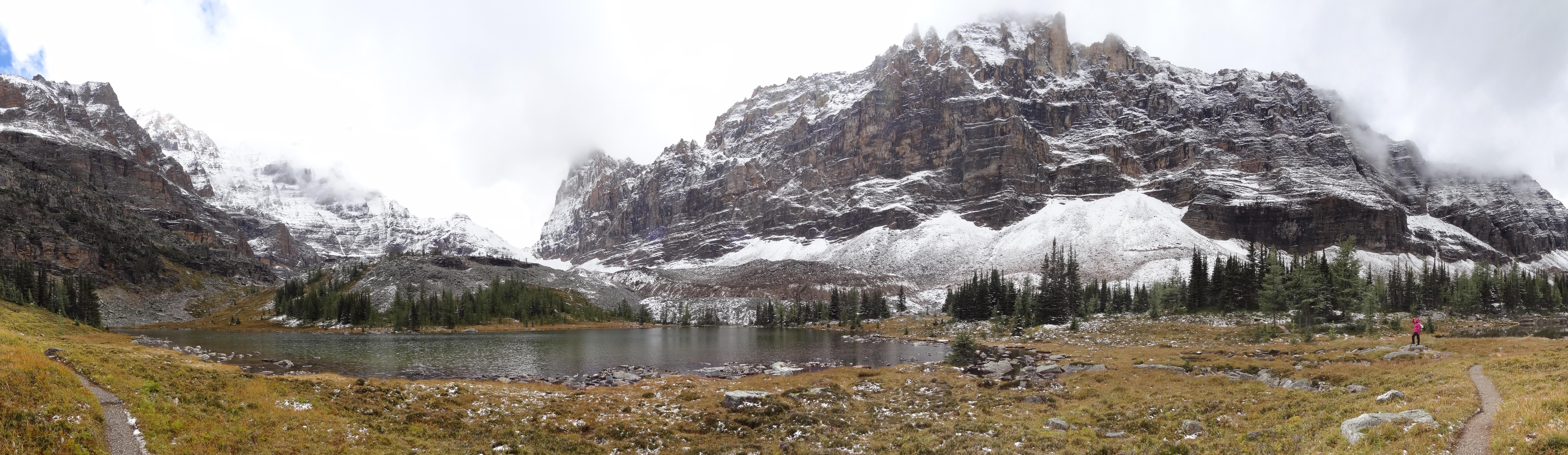
Opabin Lake on the Opabin Plateau. From left, Yukness Mountain descends from out of frame, Ringrose Peak and Mount Hungabee are obscured by the clouds, Opabin Pass is the visible col, Mount Biddle extends upwards from that col into the clouds, and Mount Schaffer is hidden behind a cloud on the far right. Hungabee Lake is just barely visible on the right. (Yoho National Park, Canada)

== See also ==
- List of lakes of British Columbia
