= Mount Victoria (Bow Range) =

Mountain in the country of Canada

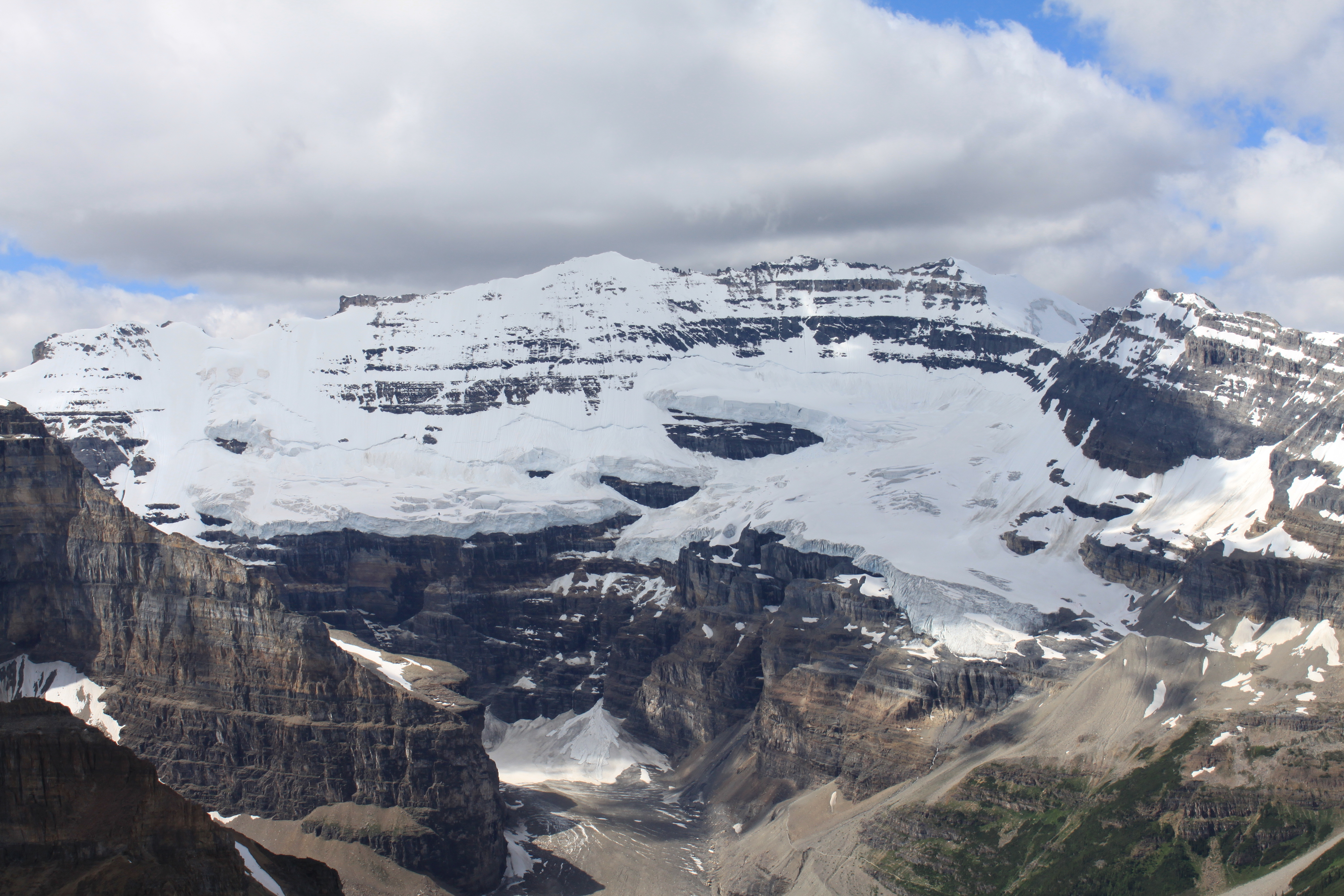
- Mt. Victoria in August 2011 as seen from Fairview Mountain

Highest point
- Elevation: 3,464 m (11,365 ft)
- Prominence: 547 m (1,795 ft)
- Parent peak: Hungabee Mountain (3492 m)
- Listing: Mountains of Alberta; Mountains of British Columbia
- Coordinates: 51°22′37″N 116°18′24″W

Geography
- Location within Alberta Location within British Columbia Location within Canada
- Interactive map of Mount Victoria
- Country: Canada
- Provinces: Alberta and British Columbia
- Protected area: Banff National Park; Yoho National Park
- Parent range: Bow Range
- Topo map: NTS 82N8 Lake Louise

Climbing
- First ascent: 1897
- Easiest route: South Summit, South-East Ridge II

Mount Victoria, 3,464 metres (11,365 ft), is a mountain on the border between British Columbia and Alberta in the Canadian Rockies. It is located just northeast of Lake O'Hara in Yoho National Park and is also part of Banff National Park and is on the Continental Divide (which is the definition of the interprovincial boundary in this region). The mountain has two peaks, the south being the highest while the north peak is slightly lower at 3,388 metres (11,115 ft).

The mountain is located on the western buttress of Abbot Pass while Mount Lefroy lies on the eastern side.

The mountain was named by J. Norman Collie in 1897 for Queen Victoria.

The first successful ascent was made in 1897 by J. Norman Collie, Arthur Michael, Charles Fay, and Peter Sarbach.

== Geology ==
Mount Victoria is composed of sedimentary rock laid down during the Cambrian period. Formed in shallow seas, this sedimentary rock was pushed east and over the top of younger rock during the Laramide orogeny.

== Climate ==
Based on the Köppen climate classification, Mount Victoria is located in a subarctic climate zone with cold, snowy winters, and mild summers. Winter temperatures can drop below −20 °C with wind chill factors below −30 °C.

== Gallery ==
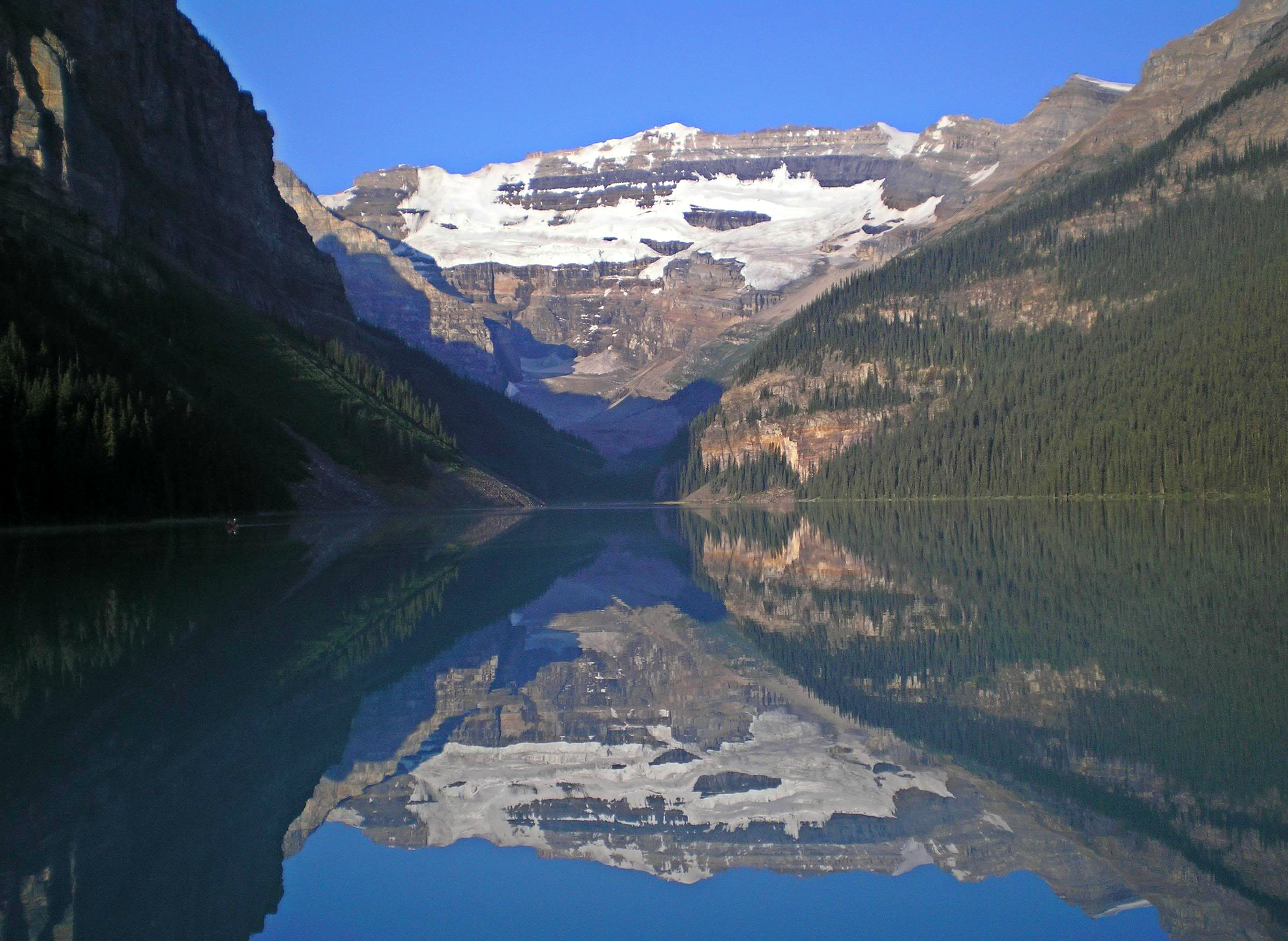
Mount Victoria reflected in Lake Louise

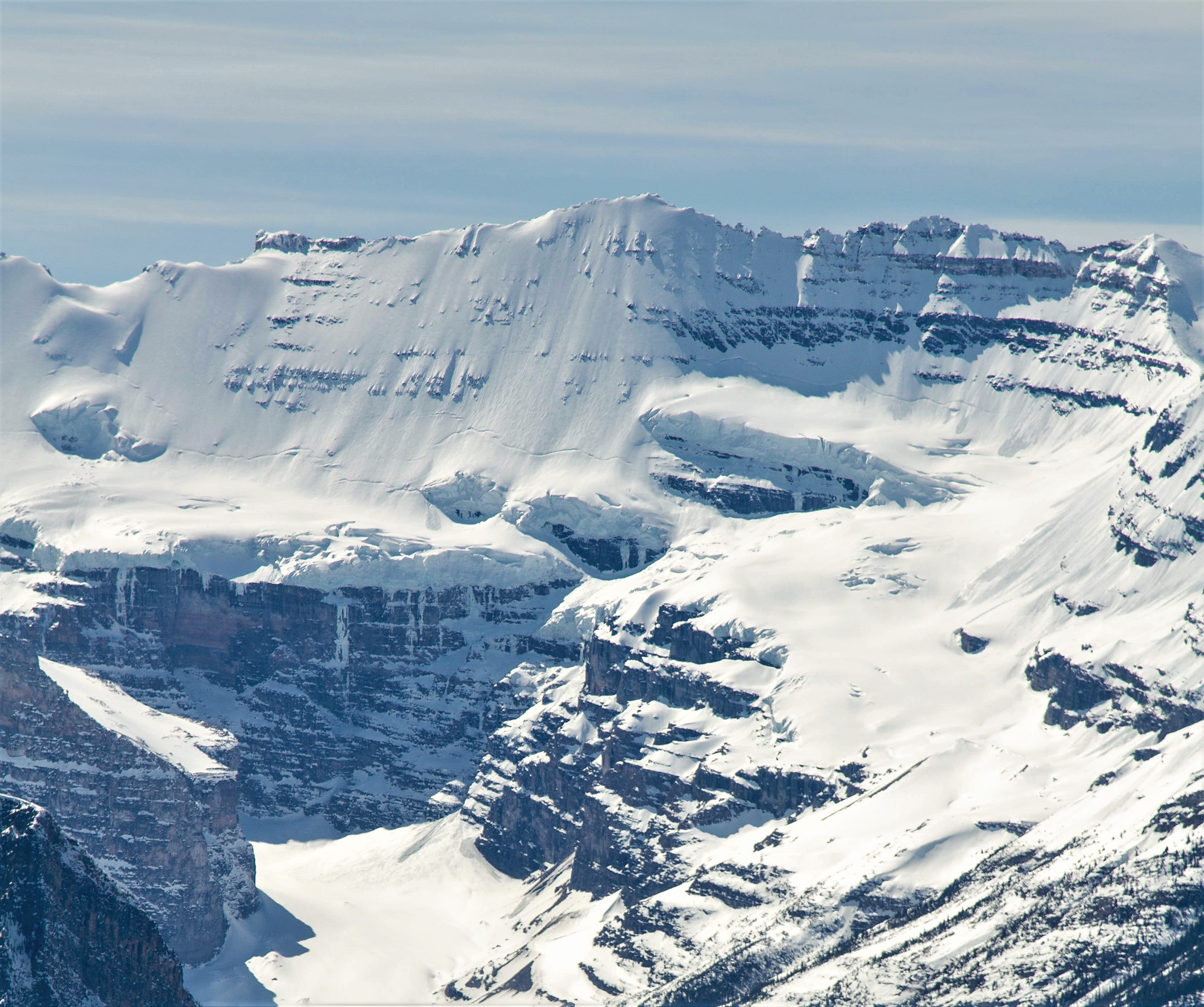
Northeast aspect viewed from Lake Louise Ski Resort

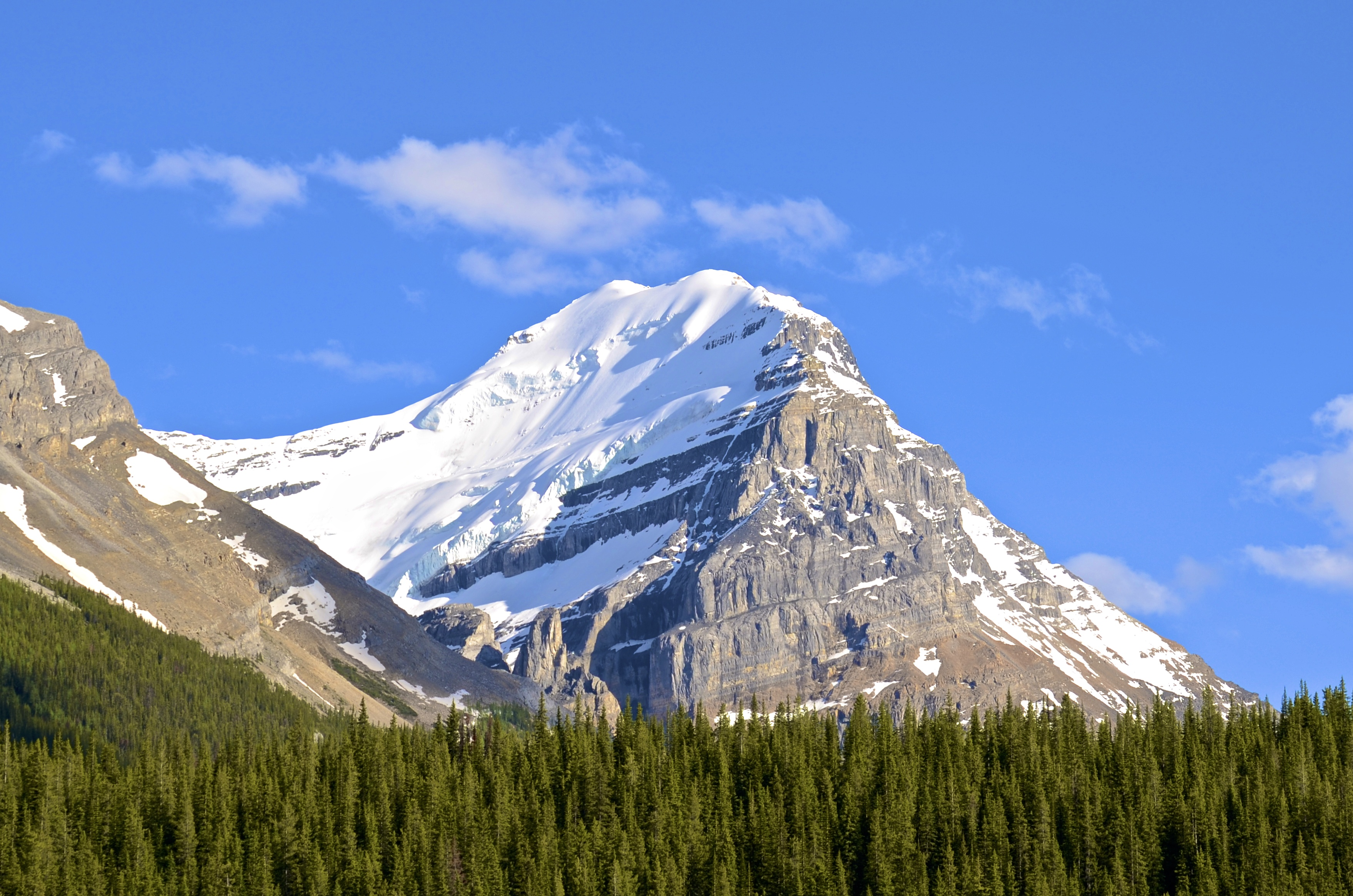
Mount Victoria's north peak seen from the Wapta Lake area

== See also ==
- Royal eponyms in Canada
