= Lake O'Hara =

Lake in British Columbia, Canada

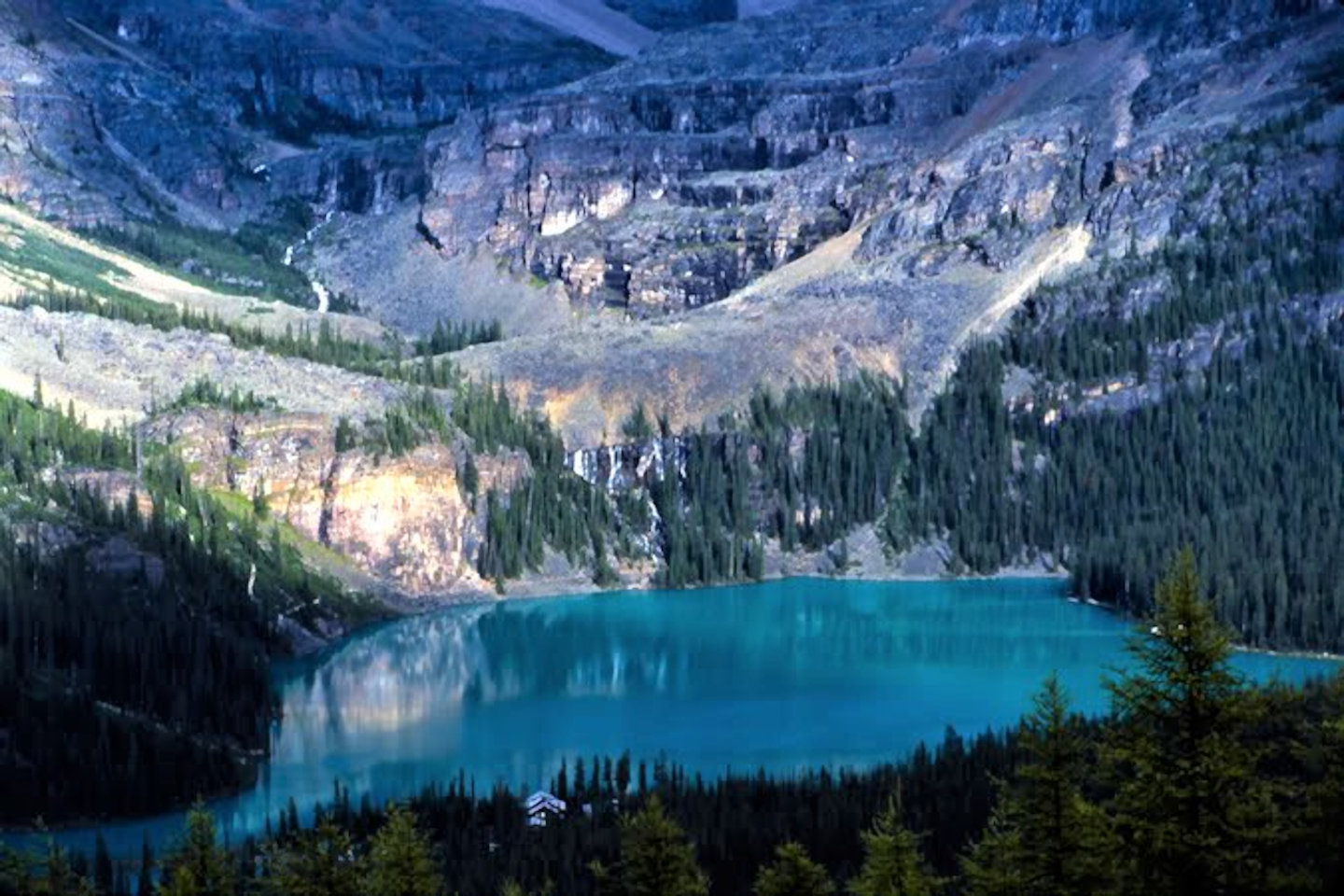
- Lake O'Hara from the Odaray Trail

- Location within British Columbia
- Location: Yoho National Park, British Columbia
- Coordinates: 51°21′21.25″N 116°19′49.60″W
- Primary outflows: Cataract Brook
- Basin countries: Canada
- Surface elevation: 2,020 m (6,630 ft)
- Settlements: None

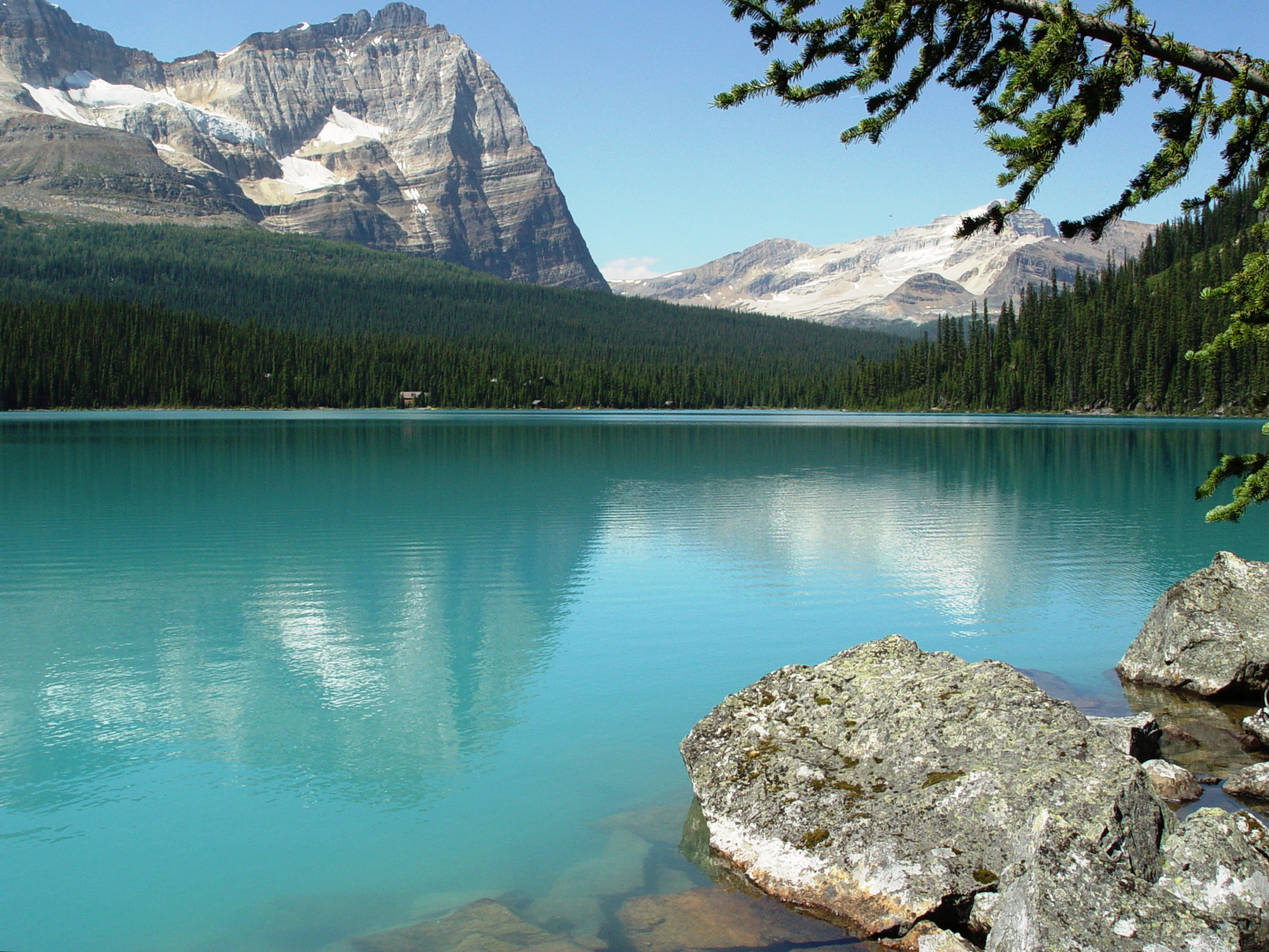
Odaray Mountain from Lake O'Hara

Lake O'Hara is a lake at an elevation of 2,020 metres (6,630 ft) in the alpine area of Yoho National Park, in the province of British Columbia, on the western side of the Great Divide with the province of Alberta and Banff National Park to the east. The lake and the valley are accessible through a bus service that is run by Parks Canada or by an 11 km hike along a road with an elevation gain of approximately 500m.

The area is known for its scenery as well as its alpine hiking. Visitors often follow the climbing trails which ascend from Lake O'Hara to Lake Oesa and to Opabin Lake. The number of people who access the area by bus has been limited in order to preserve the sensitive alpine environment.

The area is named after Colonel Robert O'Hara, an Irishman from Derryhoyle, Craughwell, County Galway who heard about the area from J.J. McArthur, a government surveyor.

The Elizabeth Parker Alpine Club Hut is in the Meadows about a 15-minute walk from the Lodge. It is a ski destination in the winter, with many skiers doing it as a day trip.

== Artwork of the Lake O'Hara area ==
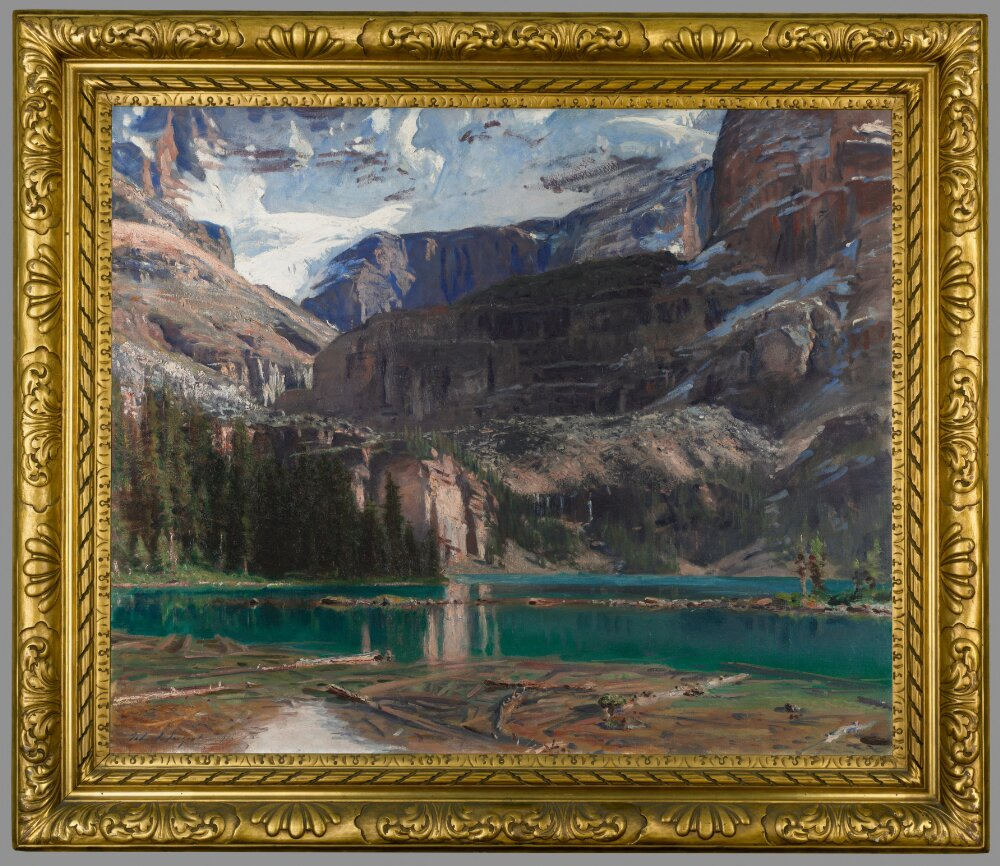
John Singer Sargent's 1916 painting of Lake O'Hara.

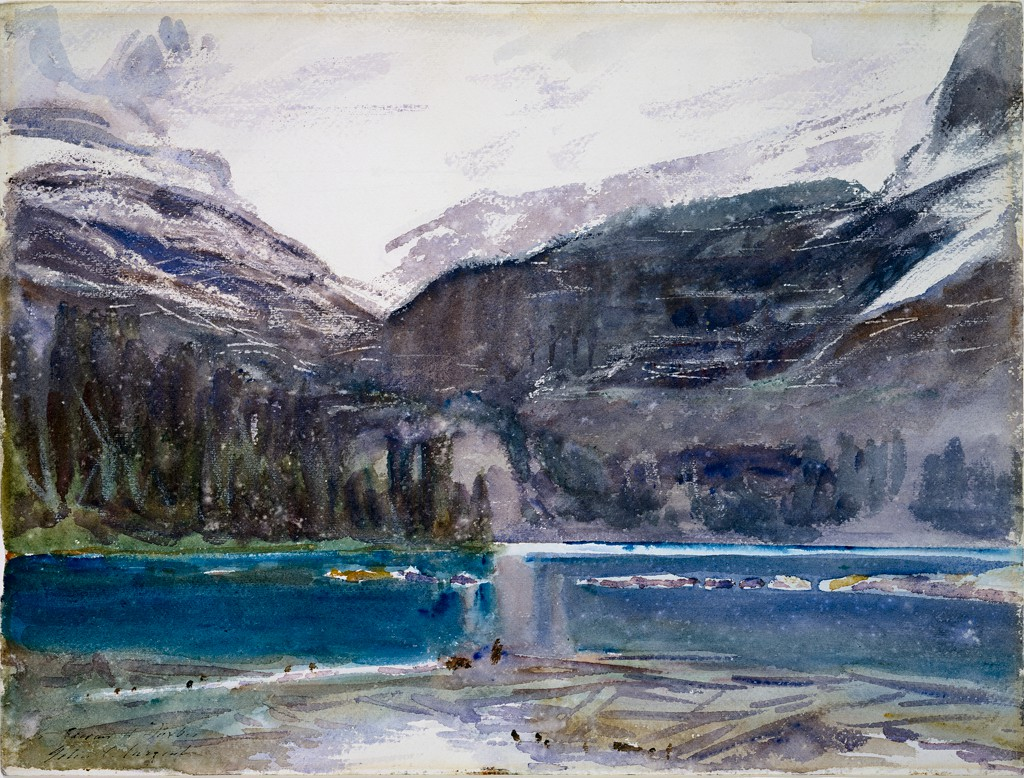
Watercolor sketch of Lake O'Hara by John Singer Sargent, 1916.

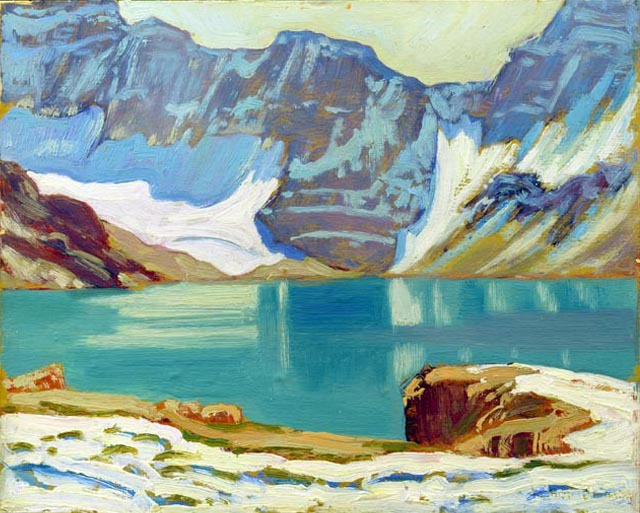
Lake McArthur by J. E. H. MacDonald, 1924.

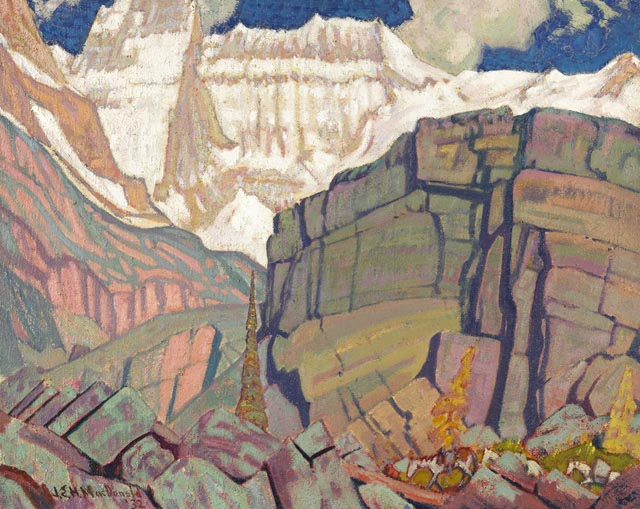
J. E. H. MacDonald painting of Mount Lefroy (1932)

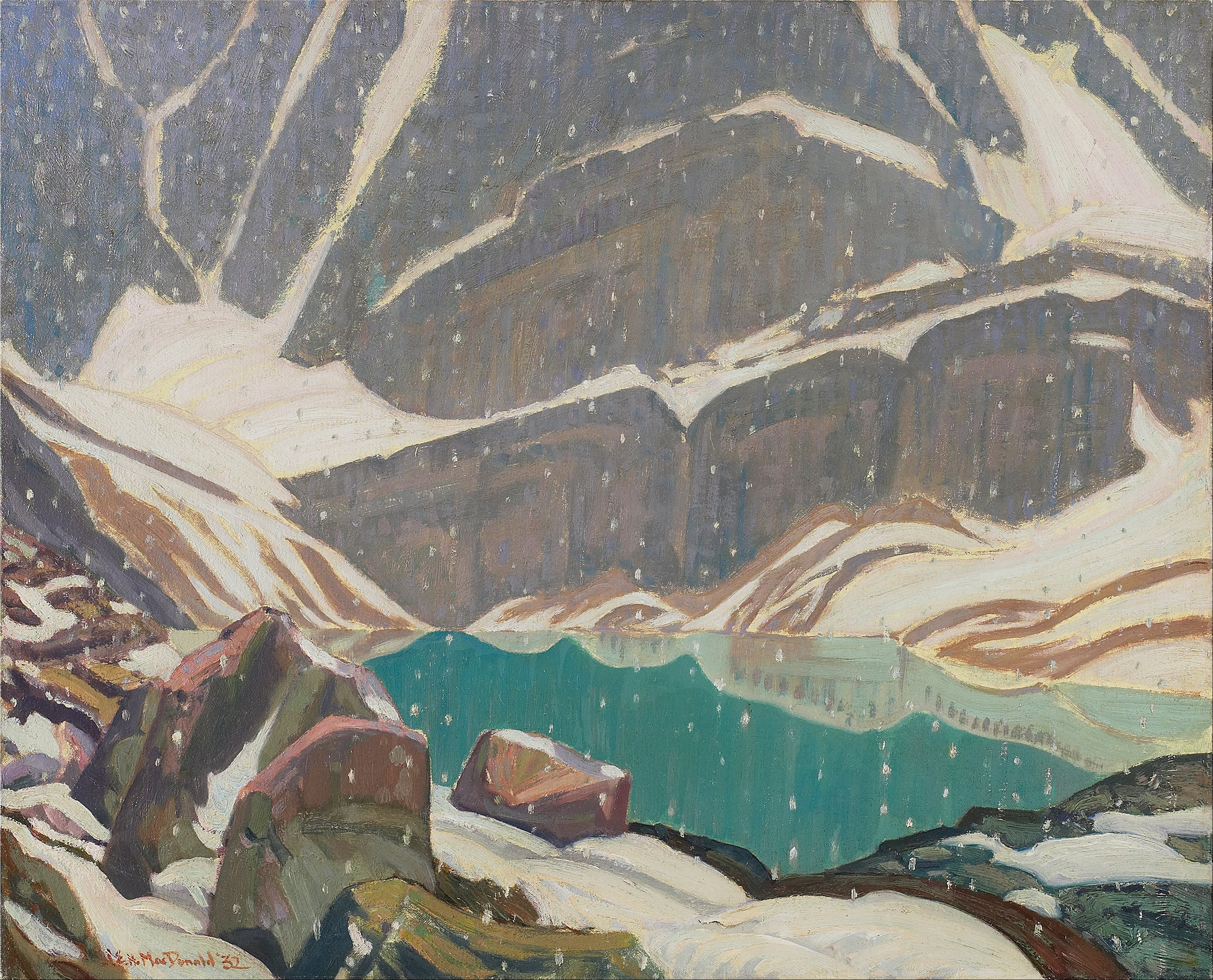
J. E. H. MacDonald painting of Lake Oesa (1932).

== See also ==
- List of lakes in Yoho National Park
