= Charles Ernest Fay =

American linguist, alpinist and educator (1846–1931)

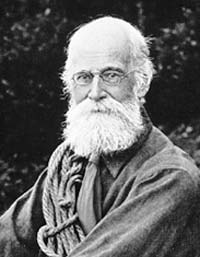
- Born: 1846
- Died: 1931 (aged 84–85)
- Occupation: Educator

Academic background
- Education: Tufts College

1st & 5th President of the American Alpine Club
- In office 1902–1907
- Succeeded by: John Muir
- In office 1917–1919
- Preceded by: Henry Grier Bryant
- Succeeded by: Lewis Livingston Delafield

Professor Charles Ernest Fay (March 10, 1846–1931) was an American alpinist and educator.

== Biography ==
He was born at Roxbury, Massachusetts. He graduated in 1868 at Tufts College and became instructor in mathematics there in 1869, and professor of modern languages in 1871. He was a founder of the Modern Language Association of America; of the New England Modern Language Association, of which he was president in 1905; and of the New England Association of Colleges and Preparatory Schools (1885), of which he was president 1888–89.

Fay first visited the Canadian Rockies in 1890, and was a pioneer in the development of mountaineering in the Canadian Rockies and the Selkirks. He was a founder of the Appalachian Mountain Club, and served as president in 1878, 1881, 1893, and 1905; he was also a founder and the first president of the American Alpine Club (1902-1904). He also edited the publications of these two organizations, Appalachia and Alpina Americana respectively. For Appalachia, he furnished numerous articles. For Alpina Americana, he wrote the richly illustrated monograph The Rocky Mountains of Canada.

He was one of a party of four attempting to climb Mount Lefroy in 1896 when Phillip Stanley Abbott became the first mountaineering fatality in the Canadian Rockies. Fay made an, “impassioned defence of mountaineering at the inquiry into Abbot’s death that put an end to the grumbling in political circles that mountaineering ought to be banned in Canada.” Fay returned in 1897 to summit both Mounts Lefroy and Victoria. In 1902 Peak #1 (Heejee) in the Valley of the Ten Peaks in Banff/Kootenay National Park was named Mount Fay in his honor. Fay made more than a dozen first ascents in western Canada's mountains and continued climbing and mountaineering until well into his eighties.

His activity as an alpinist was recognized abroad by his election as an honorary member of the English, Italian and Canadian Alpine Clubs. He was a frequent lecturer on literary and geographical subjects. The Alpine Club of Canada named the Fay Hut located in Kootenay National Park after him.
