= Lake Louise (Alberta) =

Glacial lake in Banff National Park, Alberta, Canada

Lake Louise Ho-run-num-nay
- Lake Louise from above

- Location within Alberta
- Location: Banff National Park, Alberta
- Coordinates: 51°24′42″N 116°13′41″W
- Type: Glacial Lake
- Primary inflows: Lefroy Glacier
- Primary outflows: Louise Creek
- Basin countries: Canada
- Max. length: 2.0 km (1.2 mi)
- Max. width: 0.5 km (0.31 mi)
- Surface area: 0.8 km^{2} (0.31 sq mi)
- Max. depth: 70 m (230 ft)
- Surface elevation: 1,750 m (5,740 ft)
- Settlements: Lake Louise

Lake Louise (named Horâ Juthin Îmne or Ho-run-num-nay (Lake of the Little Fishes) by the Stoney Nakoda First Nations people) is a glacial lake within Banff National Park in Alberta, Canada. Situated 11 km (6.8 mi) east of the border with British Columbia, Lake Louise is located 5 km (3.1 mi) west of the community of Lake Louise and the Trans-Canada Highway (Highway 1).

Lake Louise was well known and visited by Indigenous Peoples prior to the arrival of the Canadian Pacific Railway survey crews in the 1880s. Thomas Edmonds Wilson was the first non-Indigenous person to visit the lake, having been led there by a Stoney Nakoda guide named Edwin Hunter in 1882. Wilson named the lake "Emerald Lake" and promoted it as a development opportunity, although the lake was later renamed to Lake Louise.

Lake Louise is named after the Princess Louise Caroline Alberta (1848–1939), the fourth daughter of Queen Victoria and the wife of the Marquess of Lorne, who was the Governor General of Canada from 1878 to 1883.

The turquoise colour of the water comes from rock flour carried into the lake by melt-water from the glaciers that overlook the lake. The lake has a surface of 0.8 km^{2} (0.31 sq mi) and is drained through the 3 km long Louise Creek into the Bow River.

Fairmont's Chateau Lake Louise, one of Canada's grand railway hotels, is located on Lake Louise's eastern shore. It is a luxury resort hotel built in the early decades of the 20th century by the Canadian Pacific Railway.

Moraine Lake and Lake Agnes are also accessible from Lake Louise.

== Activities ==
Several hiking trails exist around the lake. Hiking trails include trips to Saddleback Pass, Fairview Mountain (2,744 m (9,003 ft)), Mirror Lake, Lake Agnes, Big Beehive, Little Beehive, Devils Thumb, Mount Whyte, and Mount Niblock. Some of these trails are open to mountain biking and horseback riding, and the surrounding mountain faces offer opportunities for rock climbing. Kayaking and canoeing are popular activities during summer, and a boat launch and rental facility are maintained on the north-eastern shore.

The nearby Lake Louise Ski Resort, offers amenities for alpine and cross-country skiing, as well as heli-skiing and snowboarding. The lake can be used for ice fishing and ice skating in winter, while the surrounding area offers settings for snowmobiling, dog sledding, snowshoeing and ice climbing.

== See also ==
- Lakes of Alberta
- Royal eponyms in Canada
