= John Wheeler =

John Wheeler may refer to:

== Business ==
- John Wheeler (merchant) (died 1617), English businessman
- John Neville Wheeler (1886–1973), American publishing executive and magazine editor
- John Hervey Wheeler (1908–1978), African American bank president and civil rights leader
- John Wheeler (ironmaster) (died 1708), from Wollaston, Stourbridge, England, partner of Wilden Ironworks

== Politics ==
- John Wheeler (Australian politician) (1853–1915), New South Wales politician
- John Wheeler (British politician) (born 1940), British politician and Northern Ireland Office minister
- John H. Wheeler (1806–1882), American diplomat, politician and historian
- John Ozias Wheeler (1823–1899), American merchant and politician in California
- John Wheeler (New York politician) (1823–1906), U.S. representative from New York
- John P. Wheeler III (1944–2010), presidential aide to Ronald Reagan, George H. W. Bush and George W. Bush
- John Wheeler (Kansas politician) (born 1947), member of the Kansas House of Representatives

== Science ==
- J. F. G. Wheeler (John Francis George Wheeler, 1900–1979), British whale researcher, member of the Discovery Investigations
- John Archibald Wheeler (1911–2008), American theoretical physicist
- John Oliver Wheeler (1924–2015), Canadian geologist
- J. Craig Wheeler (born 1943), American astronomer

== Sports ==
- John Wheeler (Kent cricketer), English cricketer in the 1770s
- John Wheeler (cricketer, born 1844) (1844–1908), English cricketer
- Johnny Wheeler (1928–2019), English footballer

== Other ==
- John Wheeler (college administrator) (1815–1881), first president of Baldwin Institute, a.k.a. Baldwin Wallace University
- John Wheeler (colonel) (1825–1863), Union officer in the American Civil War, killed at Gettysburg
- John W. Wheeler (1847–1907), newspaper editor
- John Wheeler (actor) (1930–2026), American actor
- John Wheeler (musician) (born 1970), American musician, songwriter and music producer

== See also ==
- Sir John Wheeler-Bennett (1902–1975), English historian
- John Wheeler House (disambiguation)
- Jack Wheeler (disambiguation)
- Wheeler (surname)
