= Wheeler House =

Wheeler House or Wheeler Home or variations may refer to:

== United States ==
(by state then city)

- Wheeler House (Tuscaloosa, Alabama), listed on the U.S. National Register of Historic Places (NRHP) in Tuscaloosa County
- Wheeler-Beecher House, Bethany, Connecticut, listed on the NRHP in New Haven County
- Jonathan Wheeler House, Canterbury, Connecticut, NRHP-listed
- Adin Wheeler House and Theodore F. Wheeler Wheelwright Shop, Southbury, Connecticut, listed on the NRHP in New Haven County
- Ephraim Wheeler House, Stratford, Connecticut, NRHP-listed
- Bradley–Wheeler House (also known simply as "Wheeler House"), Westport, Connecticut, NRHP-listed
- Wheeler Opera House, Aspen, Colorado, NRHP-listed
- Wheeler–Stallard House, Aspen, Colorado, NRHP-listed
- Wheeler House (Denver), formerly listed on the NRHP in West Denver
- Wheeler-Evans House, Oviedo, Florida, listed on the NRHP in Florida
- Wheeler–Kohn House, Chicago, Illinois, listed on the NRHP in Illinois
- Price/Wheeler House, Springfield, Illinois, listed on the NRHP in Illinois
- Wheeler–Stokely Mansion, Indianapolis, Indiana, listed on the NRHP in Indiana
- John R. Wheeler Jr. House, Dunlap, Iowa, listed on the NRHP in Harrison County
- Wheeler-Merriam House, Concord, Massachusetts, listed on the NRHP
- Wheeler-Minot Farmhouse, Concord, Massachusetts, listed on the NRHP
- Dyke-Wheeler House (also known simply as "Wheeler House"), Gloucester, Massachusetts, listed on the NRHP
- Aaron Wheeler House, Rehoboth, Massachusetts, listed on the NRHP
- Ingalls–Wheeler–Horton Homestead Site, Rehoboth, Massachusetts, listed on the NRHP
- Wheeler–Ingalls House, Rehoboth, Massachusetts, listed on the NRHP
- Albert H. Wheeler House, Southbridge, Massachusetts, NRHP-listed
- Nathaniel S. Wheeler House, Onsted, Michigan, NRHP-listed
- Burton and Lulu Wheeler Cabin, Apgar, Montana, listed on the NRHP in Montana
- Burton K. Wheeler House, Butte, Montana, NRHP-listed
- Wheeler Home (Loudonville, New York), NRHP-listed
- Menzo Wheeler House, Chaumont, New York, NRHP-listed
- George and Addison Wheeler House, East Bloomfield, New York, NRHP-listed
- Wheeler House Complex, Leonardsville, New York, NRHP-listed
- Pfeiffer-Wheeler American Chestnut Cabin, Portville, New York, NRHP-listed
- William E. Wheeler House, Portville, New York, NRHP-listed
- Millar-Wheeler House, Utica, New York, NRHP-listed
- John Wheeler House (Murfreesboro, North Carolina), listed on the National Register of Historic Places in Hertford County
- Dr. Henry Wheeler House, Grand Forks, North Dakota, NRHP-listed
- John Wheeler House (Berea, Ohio), listed on the National Register of Historic Places in Cuyahoga County, Ohio
- J. A. Wheeler House, Independence, Oregon, listed on the NRHP in Oregon
- Cora Bryant Wheeler House, Portland, Oregon, NRHP-listed
- James E. Wheeler House, Portland, Oregon, NRHP-listed
- William Wheeler House (Victoria, Texas), NRHP-listed

== See also ==
- John Wheeler House (disambiguation)
- William Wheeler House (disambiguation)
- Wheeler (disambiguation)
