= Glacier, British Columbia =

Settlement in British Columbia, Canada

Glacier, which once comprised small communities, is on the western approach to Rogers Pass in southeastern British Columbia. The name derives from the Great Glacier, which in the 1880s was just over a mile from the original train station.

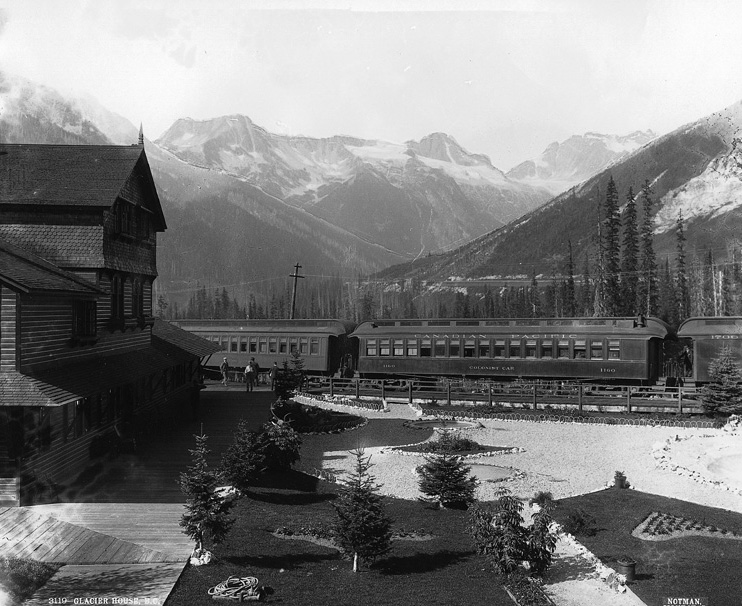
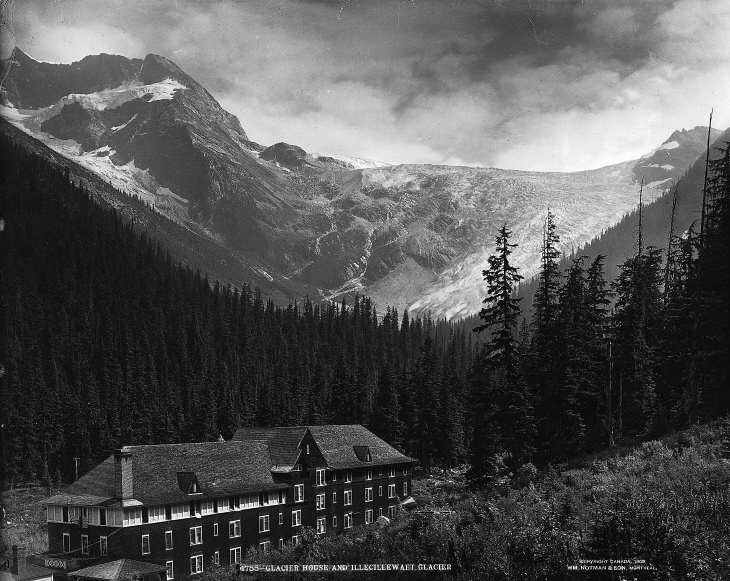
Glacier House & Cheops Mountain (northwestward), 1897 Wing, Glacier House & Illecillewaet Glacier (eastward), 1909

== Initial settlement ==
Location in British Columbia

=== Glacier House ===
To avoid hauling additional weight up the significant gradient, Canadian Pacific Railway (CP) parked a dining car at this location for a passenger train meal stop. Already ruled out were the summit, with its avalanche paths, and the steep river gorges of the eastern slope, which provided little space to develop facilities. This alpine meadow was an ideal setting for the Selkirk dining station. In 1885, Thomas Charles Sorby, future architect of the first CP Hotel Vancouver, designed a chalet for this site. The large dining room opened in November or December 1886, allowing the dining car to return to regular service.

The 15-bedroom accommodation was ready for guests in January 1887, but staff occupied half these rooms. A sleeping car was soon parked permanently to accommodate overflows. A small two-storey station served the stop. Bruce Price's 1889 design for a 22-room addition, was revised as the 32-room annex that opened in 1892. Around 1898, the dining room was enlarged, and CP constructed a two-storey building with five bedrooms upstairs and a billiard room downstairs. The 54-room wing, with elevator, and new reception area, opened in 1904. Around 1900, the station name changed from Glacier House to Glacier. Few guests stayed through the winter. Francis Rattenbury designed a substantial hotel on the site, but construction never proceeded beyond the footings.

The initial manager struggled to handle the limited time allotted for the dining stop. Acknowledging the whole facility required professional management, CP signed a lease agreement with Harry A. Perley in 1887 to run the enterprise, which appears to have been operating at a loss. Perley received all revenue, without contributing to the cost of capital improvements. After alleging for years that Perley's other hotel interests had prevented sufficient attention being paid to the Glacier operation, Mr. Sheffield, CP manager of hotels, succeeded in Perley's ousting.

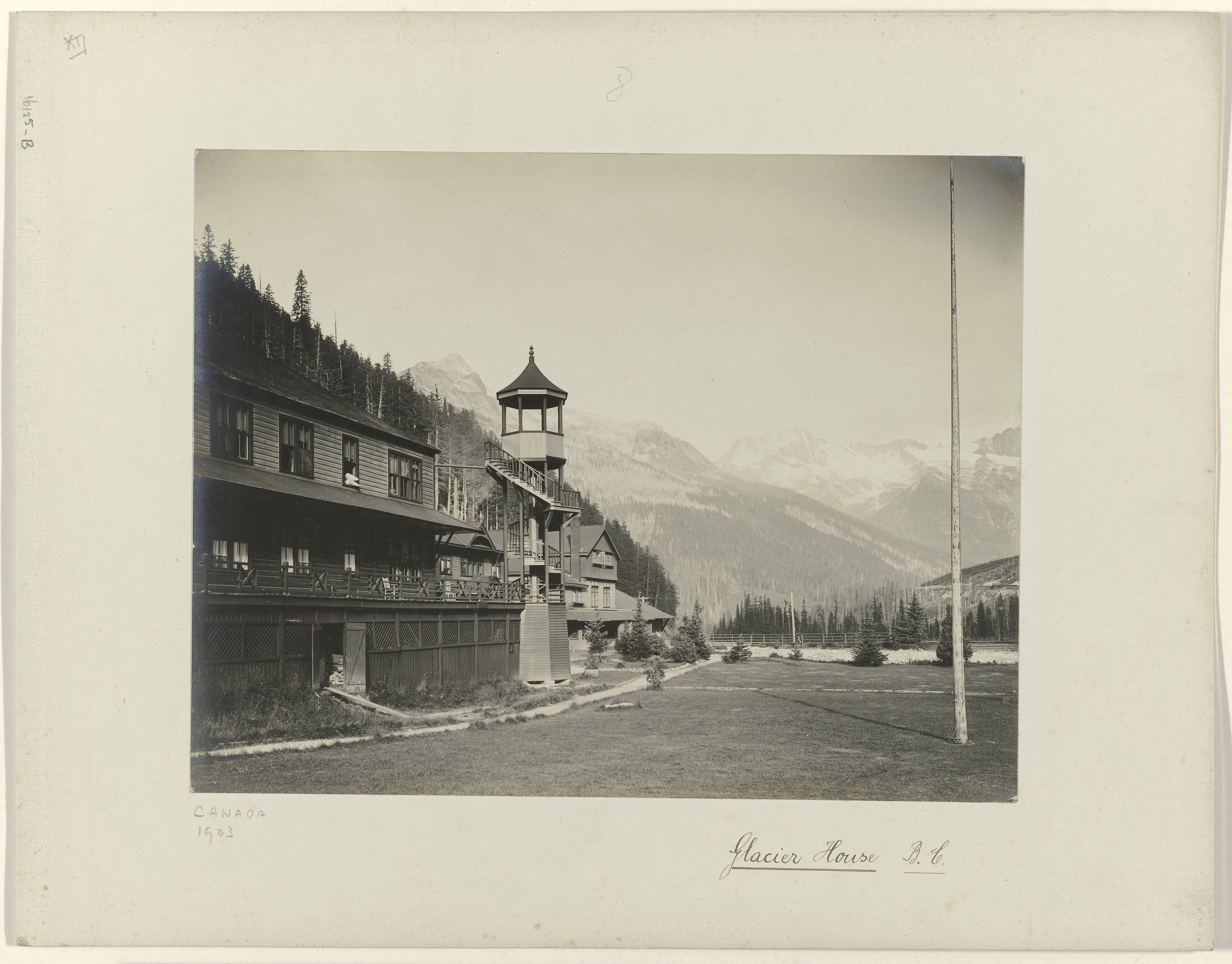
Observation tower, Glacier House (northwestward), 1903.

Miss A.E. Mollison, formerly at the CP Mount Stephen House, Field, was manager March 1897–December 1899. Succeeding her from Field was Miss Julia Mary Young, who stayed until 1920. Few details survive of the final managers.

Albert W. Sharp was the inaugural postmaster, serving only four months in 1899.

The observation tower was likely built in 1890, but a telescope was not added until 1898 to view mountaineers climbing the glacier and peaks. The tower was demolished around 1910. Other structures included a baggage room, ice house, laundry houses, bowling alley, employee and guide quarters, stables, and powerhouse. Electric lighting came around the turn of the century. Manager Young converted the bowling alley into a curio store. A Union Bank branch existed from 1912, primarily for the tunnel construction workers.

After 1909, when dining car use extended to the mountains, the Glacier House catering staff worked only the summers. George Vaux Sr., with children Mary, George Jr. and William Jr. first came in 1887, and regularly revisited. The children became noted for their photography and documentation of the area and glacier. It is unclear whether a doctor permanently staffed the small hospital. When Sir James Hector and son Douglas, New Zealand residents, stayed while on a cross-country tour of Canada in 1903, Dr. Schaeffer diagnosed Douglas as having appendicitis. Reaching Revelstoke hospital too late, Douglas died. Schaeffer and Edward Whymper attended the funeral procession. Sir James returned home, never to revisit Kicking Horse Pass, whose name recounts his explorations in 1858.

Peter Sarbach, who came in 1897, was the first professional mountain guide. Proximity to the glacier resulted in the house having more Swiss guides than other mountain hotels. CP maintained hiking trails south of the railway track until 1926, while the Department of the Interior maintained those to the north. Tourists would also visit the Nakimu Caves.

Closed to the public in the fall of 1925, and guides the following year, the rationale is confusing. Like Lake Louise, the ascent from the new station was onerous for horse-drawn vehicles. However, Lake Louise resolved this challenge with a gasoline-powered tramway (1912–1930). Rather than using the existing track infrastructure to replicate the concept, CP dismantled the bridge spans and track in 1917. Despite this encumbrance, nearly 4,000 guests stayed in 1920. The more popular Banff and Lake Louise destinations were the CP priorities, and destructive fires at those hotels, in 1924 and 1926 respectively, drained investment capital. However, CP prepared grandiose plans for Glacier as late as 1926, indicating construction within years. After CP laid off the caretakers in 1927, the buildings were looted and vandalized. The company demolished the remainder in 1929. Rebuilding proposals faded with the Great Depression.

Interpretive plaques beside the walking trail around the site identify the buildings associated with the remaining footings.

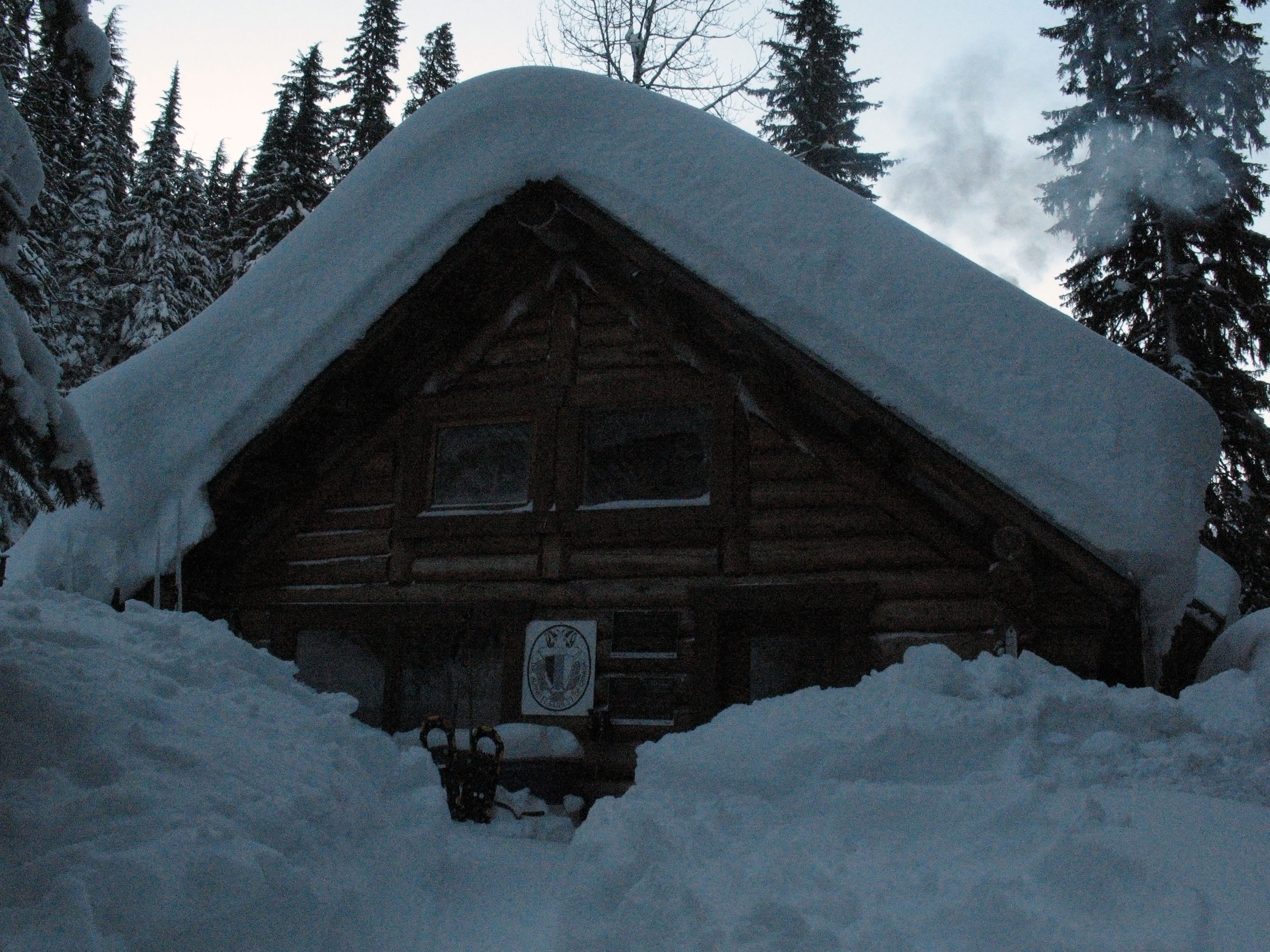
Arthur O Wheeler hut, 2007.

=== Stone arch bridge ===
The wooden railway trestle crossing the Glacier (Illecillewaet) Creek, 180 metres (590 ft) northeast of Glacier House, was replaced in 1900 with a stone arch bridge. Since that time, the current has severely eroded the southwestern riverbank, undermining the masonry. Repairs have been undertaken in recent decades. In 2019, 470 tonnes of rock were placed to reinforce the concrete footings. The Arthur O. Wheeler hut, a National Historic Site, is 160 metres (520 ft) north of the stone bridge.

=== Illecillewaet Campground ===
Accessed from the highway and opened in 1963, but about 120 metres (390 ft) northwest of the stone bridge, the campground comprises 59 sites, two kitchen shelters, flush toilets, and showers, but no laundry facilities, or water/electric/sewer hookups.

== Loop Brook ==
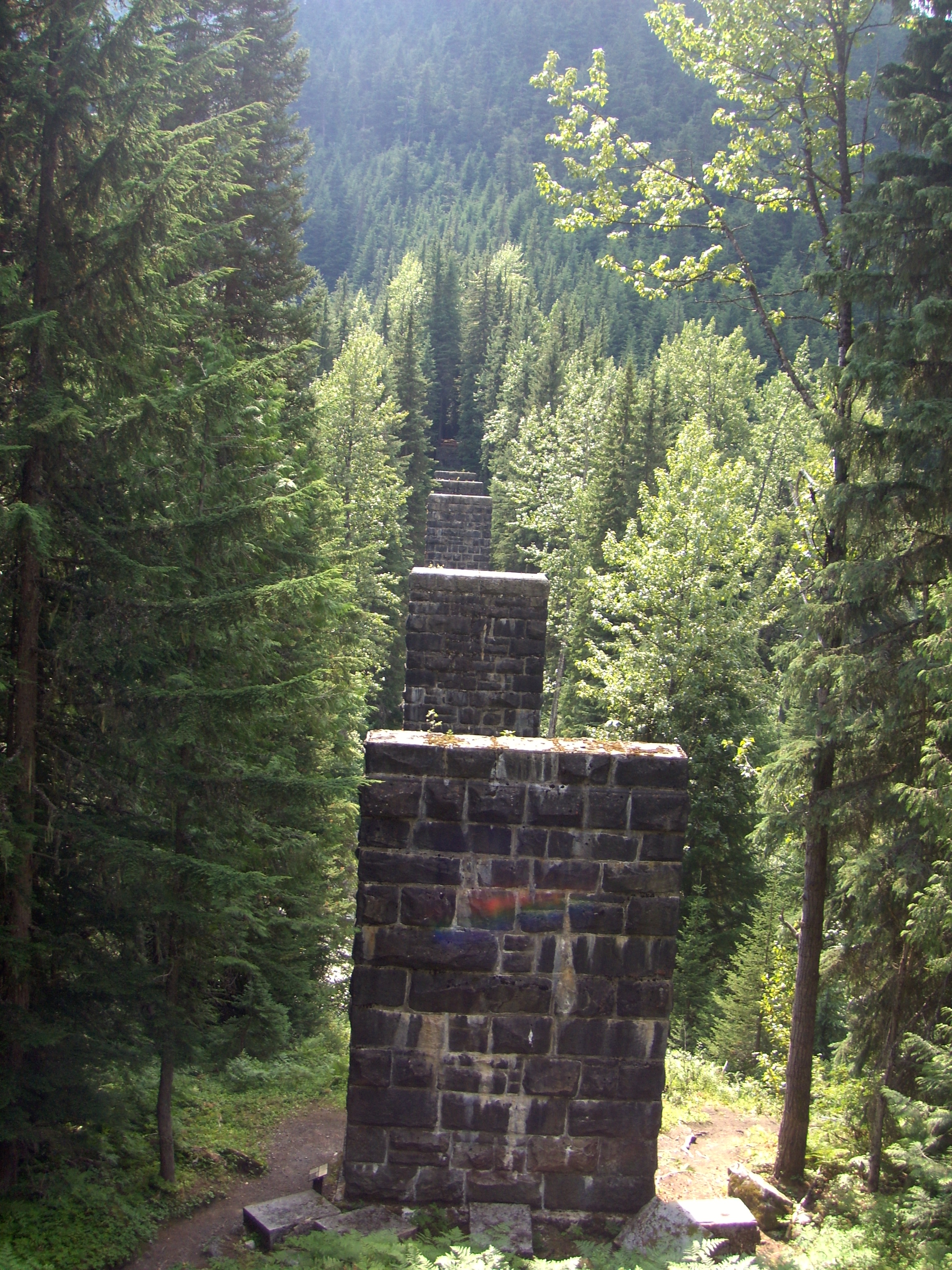
Pillars for lower loop viaduct (south of highway), Rogers Pass, 2007.

=== Loops ===
The switchback loop configuration, comprising bridging, embankments, and following the hillside, ensued because the preferred alternatives did not fit the terrain. (see Rogers Pass for further detail) The Loop Brook trail includes the stone pillars for the crossings south of today's highway. Formerly called Five Mile Creek, the crossing was known as Five Mile Creek Bridge. Water erosion undermining the footing has toppled one of the pillars on the upper crossing. Remnants from the former crossings north of today's highway are inaccessible.

=== Loop Brook Campground ===
Accessed from the highway and opened in 1963, the campground comprises 20 sites, a kitchen shelter, and flush toilets, but no shower or laundry facilities, or water/electric/sewer hookups.

== West portal ==
=== Community & construction ===
Initially called the village of West Portal, during tunnel construction, about 300 workers resided in the buildings that lay across the slope immediately southeastward from above the portal. Charles A. Procunier was the inaugural teacher when the school opened in 1918. During the 1919–1925 lining operations, the workforce peaked at 500. About 50 children attended the school.

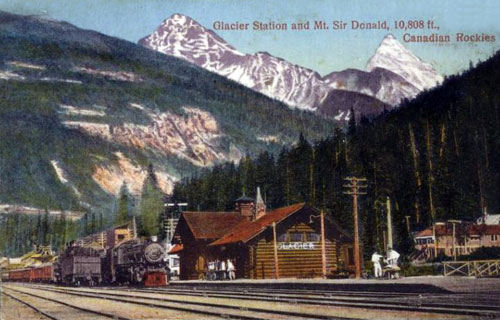
Eastward, Glacier station, c.1920

After the tunnel route became operational, the Rogers Pass and Glacier House communities gravitated to the west portal locality in 1917. However, CP maintained the road up to Glacier House. A new log station opened that year, and the post office venue changed. This coincided with the Morris family move from Rogers Pass, and the reestablishment of their store with Mrs. Ada E. Morris as postmaster. Curtis D. Morris was a JP, secretary of the school board, and established a store at Beavermouth. The largely Japanese section crew moved down from the pass, and with the watchmen, fan house employees, and telegraph operators, comprised the main population. Glacier had a 27-metre (90 ft) diameter turntable 1916–1929, which was replaced by a wye.

Following the completion of tunnel lining, the base population was about 100, reducing to 50 by 1934. Numbers reached 62 by 1941, 66 by 1943, and 93 by 1948. It is unclear whether the establishment of an inn replaced or absorbed the general store. Neither existed a decade later. After the school closed in 1952, students boarded at Albert Canyon to attend elementary school, or at Revelstoke to attend high school. The post office closed in 1960.

School Enrolment
Year	Pupils	Grade	Ref.	Year	Pupils	Grade	Ref.	Year	Pupils	Grade	Ref.	Year	Pupils	Grade	Ref.
1918‍–‍19	7			1934‍–‍35	Operated			1940‍–‍41	13	1–6		1946‍–‍47	16	1–8	
1919–25	Operated			1935–36	21	1–8		1941–42	12	2–7		1947–48	16	1–8	
1926–28	Unknown			1936–37	16	1–8		1942–43	10	1–8		1948–49	15	1–6	
1929–32	Operated			1937–38	13	1–8		1943–44	13	1–9		1949–50	14	1–7	
1932–33	Operated			1938–39	7	3–8		1944–45	13	1–9		1950–51	11	1–8	
1933–34	Unknown			1939–40	8	1–8		1945–46	12	1–7		1951–52	7	1–9	

During the Rogers Pass highway construction, 1956–1962, the headquarters camp was at Glacier.

The final year passenger trains used Glacier station was 1967. Although listed in later timetables as a railway point, it is not marked even as a flag stop. However, in the pre-Via Rail era, it may have continued in use for pre-arranged stops. The train station, a National Historic Site, which increasingly deteriorated throughout the 2000s, became picturesque only when a layer of snow covering the partially collapsed roof masked the derelict eyesore. Concerned that the water-damaged structure would completely collapse upon the railway line, CP erected a trackside retaining framework around 2021.

Although diesel generators had formerly provided electricity for residents, the CP hydroelectric substation in Revelstoke became operational in the mid 1980s, and a transmission line was extended from the Mount Macdonald Tunnel west portal.

The Connaught Track crests 150 metres (500 ft) inside the tunnel mouth. Glacier is a 2,078-metre (6,818 ft) siding at Mile 84.9 (formerly Mile 85.5), Mountain Subdivision. CP maintains a small base for the operation and maintenance of the tunnel and tracks.

Train Timetables (Regular stop or Flag stop)
	Mile	1919	1922	1929	1932	1935	1939	1943	1948	1954	1960	1964	1965
Albert Canyon	104.9	Both	Both	Both	Both	Both	Both	Both	Both	Both	Regular	Regular	Flag
Illecillewaet	98.2	Flag	Flag	Flag									
Flat Creek	93.2		Flag	Flag									
Glacier	85.5	Regular	Regular	Regular	Regular	Regular	Regular	Regular	Regular	Regular	Regular	Regular	Both
Connaught	79.0	^{a}											
Stoney Creek	76.8							Regular	Flag	Flag	Flag	Flag	
Rogers	67.8		Flag	Flag	Flag	Flag	Flag	Flag	Flag	Flag	Flag	Flag	
Beavermouth	63.0	Both	Both	Both	Both	Both	Regular	Regular	Regular	Regular	Flag	Flag	

^a . During this era, an unofficial flag stop existed.
^b . In April 1965, Golden was the next stop eastward.
^c . By November 1965, Glacier was a flag stop between Revelstoke and Golden, which had closed by July 1966.

=== Accidents ===
1918: A tunnel watchman, struck by a train at the station, lost both feet and died of his injuries.

1919: About 3 kilometres (2 mi) to the west, a freight train fatally struck two section hands hauling a sleigh along the track.

1937: When a freight hopper fell beneath a freight train near Glacier, the wheels amputated both legs and one arm.

1974: A freight train fatally struck two section hands working on the track about 2 kilometres (1.3 mi) to the west.
