= John Wheeler House =

John Wheeler House may refer to:

- Jonathan Wheeler House, Canterbury, Connecticut, listed on the National Register of Historic Places (NRHP)
- John R. Wheeler Jr. House, Dunlap, Iowa, listed on the NRHP in Harrison County, Iowa
- John Wheeler House (Murfreesboro, North Carolina), listed on the NRHP in Hertford County, North Carolina
- John Wheeler House (Berea, Ohio), listed on the NRHP in Cuyahoga County, Ohio

== See also ==
- Wheeler House (disambiguation)
- John Wheeler (disambiguation)
