= Arthur O. Wheeler hut =

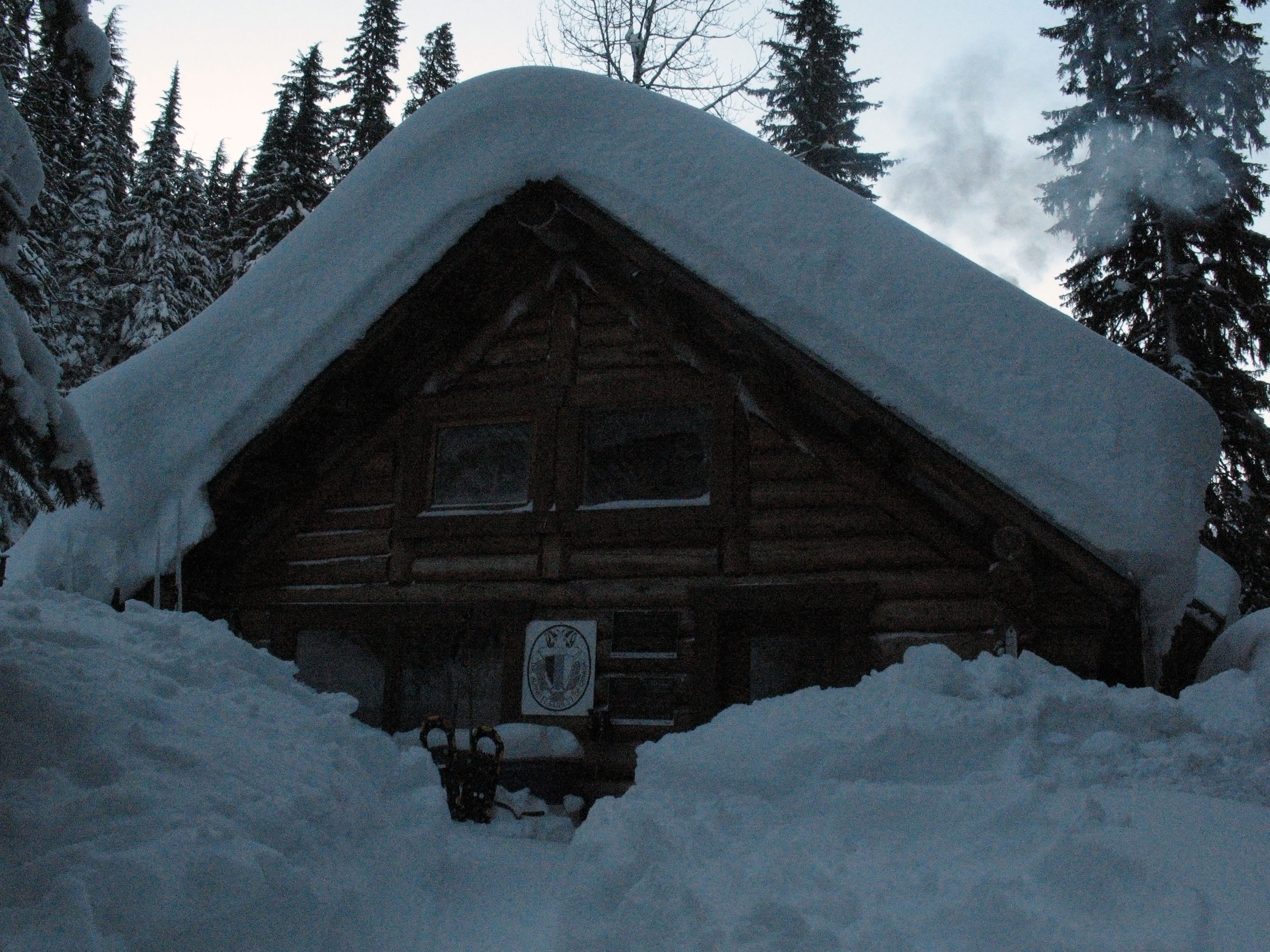
- Front side of the hut in the winter.
- Interactive map of the Arthur O. Wheeler hut area

General information
- Type: alpine hut
- Architectural style: Log cabin
- Location: Rogers Pass area, Canada
- Coordinates: 51°15′48″N 117°29′24″W
- Opened: 1947
- Owner: Alpine Club of Canada

Technical details
- Material: Wood

Design and construction
- Architect: Alpine Club of Canada

Website
- http://www.alpineclubofcanada.ca/facility/wheeler.html

The Arthur O. Wheeler hut is an alpine hut located four km southwest of Rogers Pass in Glacier National Park, British Columbia. Although not truly a backcountry hut, this log cabin is situated conveniently close to the Trans-Canada Highway in the Selkirk Mountains, west of the Rocky Mountains. It is often used as a base for mountaineering, hiking, and ski touring into the Asulkan Range and Illecillewaet Glacier areas south of the highway, and the Hermit Range north of the highway. The hut is maintained by the Alpine Club of Canada (ACC). It is the only ACC hut which can be reached by vehicle.

== History ==
The hut is named for Arthur Oliver Wheeler, who together with Elizabeth Parker and Stanley Mitchell, founded the Alpine Club of Canada. He was the first president of the club from 1906 to 1910 and held various other posts with the club, including Honorary President.

Shortly after completion of its transcontinental main line in 1885, the Canadian Pacific Railway (CPR) built the nearby Glacier House in 1887 to serve as a restaurant and hotel for guests traveling on the line. The CPR imported Swiss guides to take hotel guests onto the nearby glaciers and up the mountains, and Glacier House became the birthplace of alpinism in North America. For the first quarter of the 20th century, it served as a centre of alpinism until it was closed in 1925 after the CPR Connaught Tunnel under Rogers Pass bypassed it. The foundation ruins of Glacier House can still be seen near Wheeler hut along the short rail trail that provides access to the hut in winter.

The Alpine Club of Canada approved plans for an Alpine hut to serve as a substitute for Glacier House for alpinists in 1938, but construction did not commence until after World War II ended in 1945. Like Stanley Mitchell after which the Stanley Mitchell hut is named, A.O. Wheeler did not live to see completion of the hut named after him. He died in early 1945, while the hut was completed in 1947. Since its completion the hut has seen numerous upgrades and renovations, but remains rich in charm and history.

== Facilities ==
The hut sleeps 30 in summer and 24 in winter. There are two wood stoves for heating and drying gear, and a kitchen with propane ranges and oven. There are propane-powered lamps in the kitchen and common areas.

== Nearby ==
- Asulkan Pass
- Great Glacier Trail
- Illecillewaet Glacier
- Sapphire Col
- Mount Sir Donald
- Avalanche Peak
