= Oliver Wheeler =

Canadian land surveyor

Edward Oliver Wheeler
- Born: April 18, 1890; Ottawa, Ontario, Canada
- Died: March 19, 1962 (aged 71); Vernon, British Columbia, Canada
- Relatives: Arthur Oliver Wheeler, father, John Oliver Wheeler, son
- Military career
- Allegiance: Canada
- Branch: Corps of the Royal Engineers
- Rank: Brigadier
- Awards: He was Knighted in 1943, Military Cross, Croix de Chevalier de la Legion d'Honneur
- Other work: mountain climber, surveyor

Sir Edward Oliver Wheeler MC (April 18, 1890 – March 19, 1962) was a Canadian surveyor, mountain climber and soldier. Wheeler participated in the first topographical survey of Mount Everest in 1921. As a brigadier in the British Army he was appointed Surveyor General of India in 1941. He was knighted for the work he did surveying India. He was an accomplished mountain climber and on the 1921 expedition was one of the team to reach the 7000-metre North Col.

== Early life ==
Edward Oliver Wheeler was the son of a surveyor and renowned alpinist, Arthur Oliver Wheeler a Dominion Land Surveyor, who co-founded the Alpine Club of Canada and mapped British Columbia’s Selkirk Mountains and the British Columbia-Alberta border. His mother was Clara (née Macoun), daughter of Canadian botanist John Macoun. While still a teenager, he accompanied his father to the Selkirk Mountains and learned both how to climb and the Canadian method of photo-topography developed by Dr. Edouard Deville. As a founding member of the Alpine Club of Canada, he guided new members on the initial climbs in the Rockies.

== Education ==
He attended Trinity College School where he was chosen Head Boy. Having finished first on the admission exams to the Royal Military College of Canada in Kingston, Ontario, he attended that university for three years from 1907 to 1910. He finished first of his class in all three years at RMC. In his graduating year he was the battalion sergeant major, the highest rank attainable by a gentleman cadet. He was given a choice of commissions in the British Army. He became a Royal Engineer and attended the School of Military Engineering in Chatham, UK. Upon this graduation he was posted to the 1st King George V's Own Bengal Sappers and Miners.

== Career ==
During the First World War he served with 1st King George V's Own Bengal Sappers and Miners as part of the Indian Expedition Forces in 1914 and with the same forces in Mesopotamia campaign 1916-19. He was Mentioned in Despatches 7 times for actions both in France and Mesopotamia. He was awarded the Military Cross and a Croix de Chevalier de la Legion d'Honneur.

In 1919, he was seconded to the Survey of India. During this time he was a member of the 1921 Everest reconnaissance expedition, using photographic surveying techniques. His exploration of the East Rongbuk glacier led him on 3 August 1921 to realise that this provided the key to a viable route to the summit of Everest. He was one of the climbing team to reach the North Col.

He married Dorothea Sophia Danielson in 1921. His son John Oliver Wheeler (1925–2015) was an award-winning Canadian geologist with the Geological Survey of Canada.

Edward came to Canada on sick leave in 1922 but returned to India in 1923. During this stay he toured Canada discussing his adventure on Everest including an address to the Empire Club of Canada. In 1925 further convalescing in Canada was necessary after another operation in London. He then returned to India. He rose through the positions of superintendent (1927), director (1939) and finally to surveyor-general of India (1941–1947). He was knighted in 1943.

== Personal life ==
Upon his retirement, he returned to Canada with his wife, and lived in Lavington, near Vernon. He was active with the Alpine Club of Canada. From 1950 to 1954, Wheeler served as president of the Alpine Club of Canada. He was a life membership of the Alpine Club (UK) and a member of the American Alpine Club.

Wheeler died following a stroke.

== Mountain ascents of note ==
Ascent	Year	Significance
Mount Hector and Observation Peak in Alberta, Canada	1903	
Hungabee Mountain on the Alberta, British Columbia border, Canada	1909	with Val Fynn
Mount Babel in Alberta, Canada	1910	the first ascent
Mount Tupper and Mount Sir Donald in Glacier National Park in Canadian Rockies	1910	guideless climbs
Pyrenees Mountains and Lakes District in southwest Europe	1911	with his father, Arthur Oliver Wheeler
Strathcona Provincial Park on Vancouver Island, British Columbia, Canada	1912	led the Expedition, first ascent of Elkhorn Mountain,
Mount Assiniboine on the Alberta, British Columbia border,	1920	planned, erected, and directed base camp
Mount Everest, on the Nepal, Tibet border	1921	mapped possible mountain climbing routes (e.g. northern, eastern and western sides, Tibetan Plateau and East Rongbuk Glacier) under Colonel Charles Howard-Bury

== Publications ==
- Wheeler, E.O. "Mt. Babel and Chimney Peak." The Canadian Alpine Journal, vol. 3, The Alpine Club of Canada. Banff, Alberta. 1911. p. 73-79.
- Wheeler, E.O. "Mount Elkhorn, Strathcona Park." The Canadian Alpine Journal, vol. 5, The Alpine Club of Canada. Banff, Alberta. 1913. p. 44-48.
- Wheeler, E.O. "Traverse of Terrapin and West Ridge of Magog." The Canadian Alpine Journal, vol. 12, The Alpine Club of Canada. Banff, Alberta. 1921-22. p. 53-55.
- Wheeler, E. O. "The Photographic Survey", Mount Everest the Reconnaissance, Edward Arnold, London, 1922. p. 329-337.
- Wheeler, E. O. "The "Canadian" Photo-topographical Method of Survey", The Royal Engineers Journal, vol. 35, The Institution of Royal Engineers, Chatham, UK, March 1922. p. 177-185.
- Wheeler, E.O. "Mt. Everest Expedition/1921." The Canadian Alpine Journal, vol. 13. The Alpine Club of Canada. Banff, Alberta. 1923. p. 1-25.
- Wheeler, E.O. "ACC Golden Jubilee." The Canadian Alpine Journal, vol. 39, The Alpine Club of Canada. Banff, Alberta. 1956. p. 3-24.
- Wheeler, E. O. The Survey of India during War and Early Reconstruction 1939-1946, The Surveyor General of India, Dehra Dun, India, 1955.
