= Thomas Milles =

Thomas Milles may refer to:

- Thomas Milles (bailiff) (1550–1626), English customs official, known for his economic writings
- Thomas Milles (bishop) (1671–1740), Church of Ireland bishop of Waterford and Lismore
