= Arthur Oliver Wheeler =

Canadian land surveyor

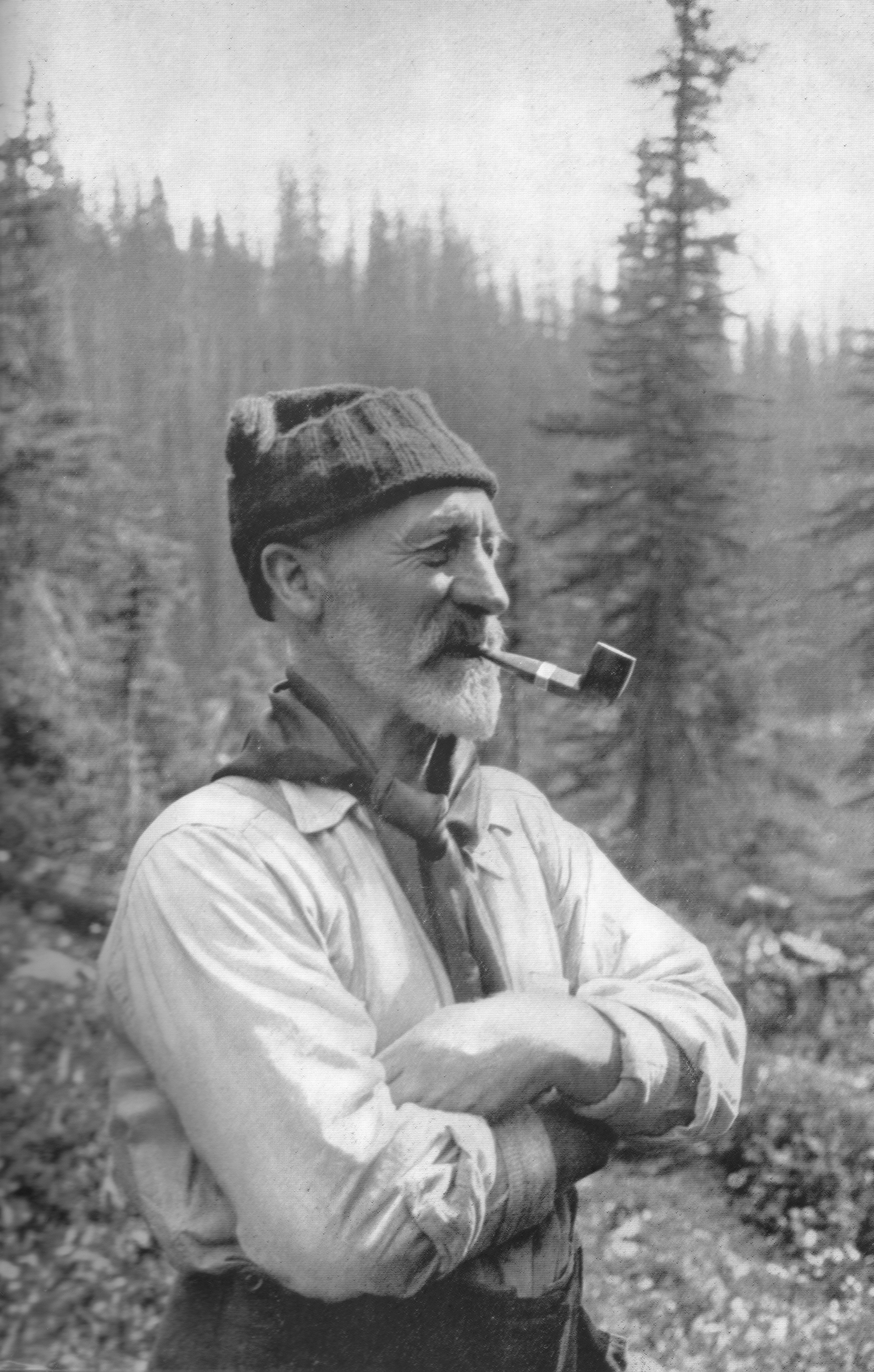
- A.O. Wheeler
- Born: May 1, 1860; Kilkenny, Ireland
- Died: May 20, 1945 (aged 85); Banff, Alberta, Canada
- Occupation: Land Surveyor
- Employer: Dominion of Canada
- Known for: Co-founder and first president of the Alpine Club of Canada
- Spouses: Clara Macoun (m. 1888–1923) Emmeline Savatard (m. 1924–1945)
- Children: Edward Oliver Wheeler
- Relatives: John Oliver Wheeler (grandson)

Arthur Oliver Wheeler (May 1, 1860 – May 20, 1945) was born in Ireland and immigrated to Canada in 1876 at the age of 16. He became a land surveyor and surveyed large areas of western Canada, including photo-topographical surveys of the Selkirk Mountains and the British Columbia-Alberta boundary along the continental divide through the Canadian Rockies. In 1906, he and journalist Elizabeth Parker were the principal founders of the Alpine Club of Canada (ACC). He was its first president, from 1906 to 1910, and editor of the Canadian Alpine Journal from 1907 to 1930. He remained Honorary President of the ACC from 1926 until his death in 1945. The Arthur O. Wheeler hut of the ACC is named after him.

== Early life ==
Wheeler was born on May 1, 1860, at The Rocks, the Wheeler family estate near Kilkenny, Ireland. He was educated at Ballinasloe College, County Galway, and at Dulwich College, London. The family fell upon hard times in Ireland, and in 1876 they sold their estates and moved to Canada, where his father took up the post of harbour master in Collingwood, Ontario. In 1876, at the age of 16, Wheeler met noted land surveyor, Lauchlan Alexander Hamilton, and became his apprentice. In 1877, Wheeler was hired by surveyor Elihu Stewart to work north of the Great Lakes in the Algoma District of Ontario, where he spent the summer paddling a birch bark canoe. In 1878 he again worked for Stewart and travelled from Winnipeg, Manitoba, to Battleford, Saskatchewan using Red River ox carts to survey Indian reserves near Battleford and Prince Albert, Saskatchewan. In the following three years he returned to Ontario and studied to qualify as a Dominion Land Surveyor. He qualified as Ontario Land Surveyor in 1881; as Manitoba and Dominion Land Surveyor in 1882.

== Career ==
In 1883, Wheeler was employed by the Canadian Government on pioneer surveys in the North-West Territories, which then included the future provinces of Saskatchewan and Alberta and parts of what are now Manitoba. In 1884 he sub-divided a number of Canadian Pacific Railway townsites along the line of railway construction. In 1885 he was appointed a technical officer of the Topographical Surveys Branch of the Department of the Interior in 1885 under Dr. Edouard Deville, Surveyor General of Canada, where he was trained in the specialty of photo-topographical surveying then being applied by Dr. Deville to the mapping of the Canadian Rocky Mountains.

In 1885 the North-West Rebellion was begun by Louis Riel, which pitted the Métis people of the District of Saskatchewan against the government of Canada. Wheeler joined the Canadian militia as a lieutenant with the Dominion Land Surveyors Intelligence Corps under Captain J. S. Dennis and, with a group of other land surveyors, marched to help quell the rebellion. At the Battle of Batoche, one surveyor was killed and three others wounded. Wheeler was grazed in the shoulder by a sniper's bullet, but a few days later learned that his family in Ontario had been informed that he had been killed in action. After returning to Ottawa, Wheeler met Clara Macoun, daughter of famous Canadian botanist John Macoun who had made numerous trips to the North-West to survey the railway and evaluate the land for farming. Arthur married Clara in Ottawa in 1888.

In 1891, Arthur, Clara, and their new son Edward Oliver Wheeler (known as Oliver) headed west to New Westminster, British Columbia, where Wheeler went into private practice as a surveyor. His private surveying work was supplemented by work for the Department of the Interior, and he was joined in his surveying business by his younger brothers Hector and Willie. A real estate crash nearly wiped them out, and in 1894 he rejoined the Topographical Survey Branch of the Department of the Interior. Wheeler spent six years surveying the area south of Calgary, Alberta, and in 1898 moved his wife and son to Calgary. During this period he surveyed the watersheds of the Elbow, Sheep, Highwood, Oldman, Belly, Waterton, Little Bow, St. Mary and Milk Rivers. In 1900, the Department of the Interior announced it was going to close its office in Calgary, so Wheeler spent the summer surveying the Crowsnest Pass area in Alberta, and in 1901 the Wheelers returned to Ottawa.

In 1901, the Surveyor-General of Canada, Dr. Edouard Deville, assigned Wheeler the task of surveying the Rogers Pass area of the Selkirk Range in British Columbia. On the train to Rogers Pass, Wheeler met Edward Whymper, who had made the first ascent of the Matterhorn in 1865 and who was in Canada as a guest of the Canadian Pacific Railway. At Rogers Pass, Wheeler met a group of professional Swiss mountain guides in the employ of the railway, and it was with six of them that he made his first ascent of a major peak. He continued to climb mountains in the area, and in 1902 took his son Oliver on a first ascent of a previously unnamed peak, which he named Mount Oliver after his son. Wheeler also made a first ascent of a major peak, which he named Mount Wheeler after himself. In 1903, Wheeler was assigned the survey of the railway belt through the Canadian Rockies east of Rogers Pass. During the following two years, he met numerous American and British climbers who were making first ascents among the vast ranges of unclimbed peaks in the Canadian west.

In 1904, Wheeler attended the International Geographic Congress, convened at Washington, as delegate from the Department of the Interior, and, while it was in session, visited Washington, New York, Philadelphia, Chicago and the St. Louis World's Fair. In 1905 he was invited to speak at a meeting of the Appalachian Mountain Club in Boston. Later that year, he published a book called The Selkirk Range, the first book written by a Canadian to celebrate a mountain range.

Wheeler returned to private practice from 1910 to 1913, and then was appointed Commissioner of the Alberta / British Columbia boundary survey. From 1913 to 1925 he was responsible for surveying the portion of the boundary which follows the Continental Divide of the Americas from the United States Boundary at the 49th parallel to its intersection with the 120th meridian, a distance of 600 miles (970 km). During this assignment Wheeler named many of the peaks in the Kananaskis area of Alberta after World War I British and French generals, admirals and battleships. At its close, Wheeler retired from active professional work.

== Alpine Club of Canada ==
After the American Alpine Club was founded in 1902, its first president Charles Fay whom Wheeler had met at Glacier House in Rogers Pass suggested that a Canadian chapter of the club be formed. Wheeler took up the task of promoting the idea, but Elizabeth Parker, a journalist at the Winnipeg Free Press, objected strenuously to Canada becoming a subsidiary to the United States in this matter. Wheeler took her objections to heart, and as a result, when the Alpine Club of Canada (ACC) was founded in 1906, Arthur Oliver Wheeler became its first President and Elizabeth Parker became its first Secretary.

The Alpine Club of Canada was his most important contribution. He was involved in every phase of the club's activities for the last thirty-eight years of his life. He served as President of the ACC from 1906 to 1910, and then managing director for 16 years from 1907 to 1930. The year following the founding of the club, he prepared the first issue of the Canadian Alpine Journal and was its editor for 20 years until 1927. In 1907, as President of the Alpine Club of Canada, he attended the 50th anniversary celebration dinner of the Alpine Club (UK) in London.

In 1923 his beloved wife, Clara, died, and in 1924 he married Emmeline Savatard who had been the "Girl Friday" for the ACC for the previous 20 years and who remained with him until his death in 1945.

On his retirement he was named Honorary President of the ACC, and held the position from 1926 until his death in early 1945. He continued to be active in the club and was the driving force behind two of its most successful expeditions: the Mount Robson camp which in 1913 made the first confirmed ascent of the highest mountain in the Canadian Rockies; and the 1925 first ascent of Mount Logan, the highest mountain in Canada.

== Honors ==
Wheeler was elected an honorary member of the Dominion Land Surveyors Association, and served for many years as the Canadian representative on the International Commission on Glaciers. In 1908, proposed by the famous mountaineer Edward Whymper, Wheeler was elected to honorary membership in the Alpine Club (UK). He also became an honorary member of the French Alpine Club, the Appalachian Mountain Club and the American Alpine Club. In 1920, at the Allied Congress of Alpinism, the Prince of Monaco recognized Wheeler's good work by making him an Officer of the Order of St. Charles and conferring upon him the Cross of the Order.

Wheeler was elected as one of the first Fellows of The Royal Canadian Geographical Society in 1930.

Wheeler was Honorary President of the Alpine Club of Canada from 1926 to 1945 and the club's Arthur O. Wheeler hut near Rogers Pass was named after him. Although the ACC approved the project in 1938, construction did not begin until after the end of World War II in 1945. The hut built in his honor was not completed until 1947, two years after A.O. Wheeler died. It has been expanded and renovated many times since and remains one of the ACC's most popular huts.

== Lineage ==
Wheeler was the great-grandson of Jonas Wheeler, who was Lord Bishop of St. Canice's Cathedral in Kilkenny, Ireland. His grandfather was William Oliver Wheeler, who fought with the 12th Royal Lancers against Napoleon in Portugal and Spain, and later became mayor of Kilkenny. Wheeler's father, Edward Oliver Wheeler, was a captain in the Kilkenny Fusiliers.

He is the father of Sir Edward Oliver Wheeler, who participated in the first topographical survey of Mount Everest in 1921, and as Brigadier in the British Army was appointed Surveyor General of India in 1941. He is the grandfather of John Oliver Wheeler, an award-winning Canadian geologist.
