= Illecillewaet Glacier =

Glacier in Canada

- Great Glacier
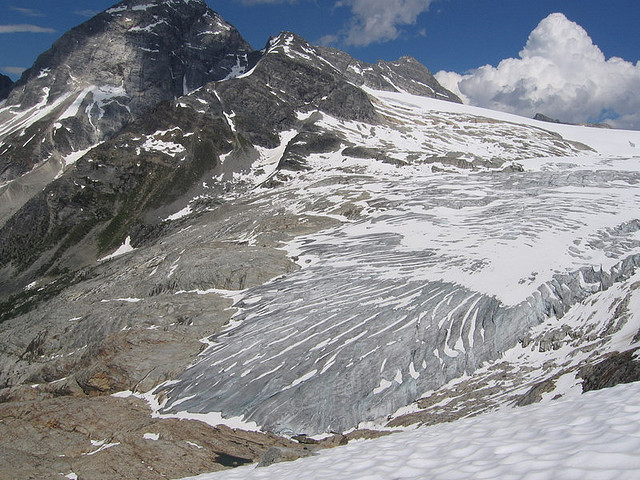
- Northern terminus of glacier in July 2006

- Location within British Columbia
- Type: Alpine
- Location: Selkirk Mountains, British Columbia, Canada
- Coordinates: 51°14′12″N 117°26′30″W
- Area: 8.83 square kilometres (3.41 sq mi)
- Status: Retreating

The Illecillewaet Glacier /ˌɪləˈsɪləwət/ is a glacier in British Columbia, Canada. It is located inside Glacier National Park in the Selkirk Mountains, a sub-range of the Columbia Mountains. After the construction of the Canadian Pacific Railway (CPR) near the glacier's terminus, and the building of a hotel nearby, the glacier became a prominent tourist destination in the Canadian west. Easily accessible by road and railway, it is one of the most-studied glaciers in North America. Its retreat over the last one hundred years has been extensively documented.

== Physical characteristics ==
The glacier is located south of Mount Sir Donald in the Selkirk Mountains, west of Rogers Pass in British Columbia. The outflow of the glacier forms the headwaters of the Illecillewaet River. The Illecillewaet névé feeds three other glaciers: the Asulkan, Geikie and Deville. As of 2002, the accumulation area of the glacier is 4.92 square kilometres (1.90 sq mi) while its ablation area is 3.91 square kilometres (1.51 sq mi), for a total size of 8.83 square kilometres (3.41 sq mi). Its estimated mean depth is 100 metres (330 ft), and its highest point is measured at 2,800 metres (9,200 ft). The exposed bedrock downslope of the glacier's terminus shows the effects of glacial plucking.

== History ==
=== CPR and Glacier House ===
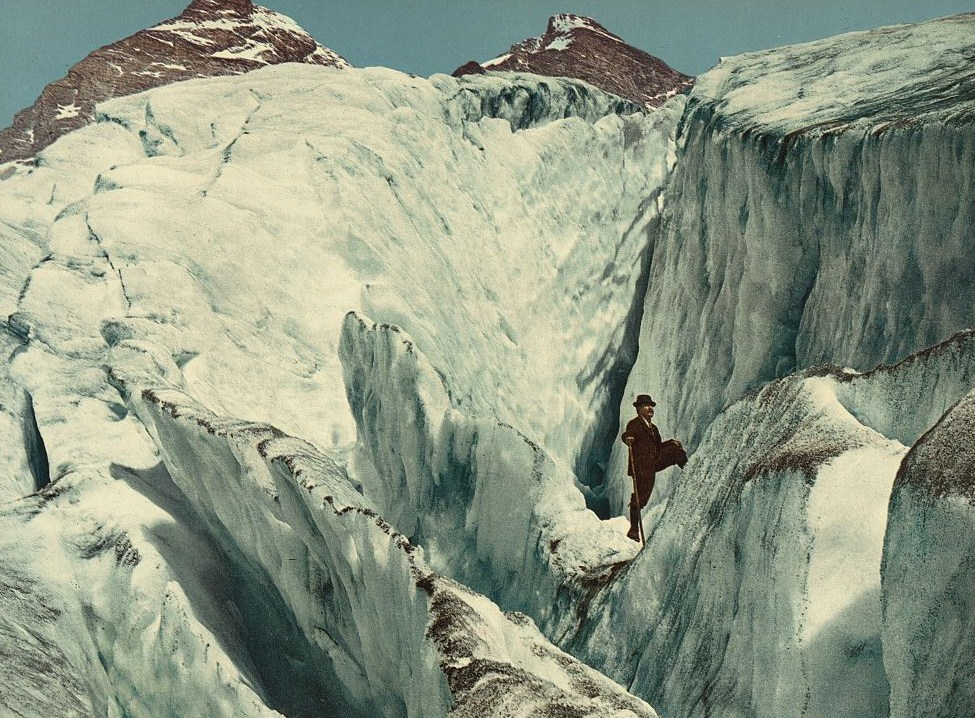
A visitor to the glacier in 1902

Although First Nations people were present in valleys to the east and west, evidence of aboriginal settlement in the Illecillewaet area has not been found. The first European to visit the glacier was Major A.B. Rogers, a railway surveyor, who examined the area in 1882 and 1883 in search of a viable pass. With the completion of the transcontinental Canadian Pacific Railway (CPR) through nearby Rogers Pass in 1885, the glacier and its surrounding area became one of western Canada's first tourist destinations. Glacier National Park was established in 1886, and Glacier House, a small hotel, was built near the terminus of the glacier in the same year. The hotel was expanded in 1892 and 1904, and by 1907 the glacier was described as the "most visited glacier in the Americas".

At this point, the glacier was called the "Great Glacier" by CPR promoters. The name "Illecillewaet" is an Okanagan First Nations word for "big water", and referred to the river before being applied to the glacier. It gradually replaced "Great" and was adopted by Parks Canada in the 1960s.

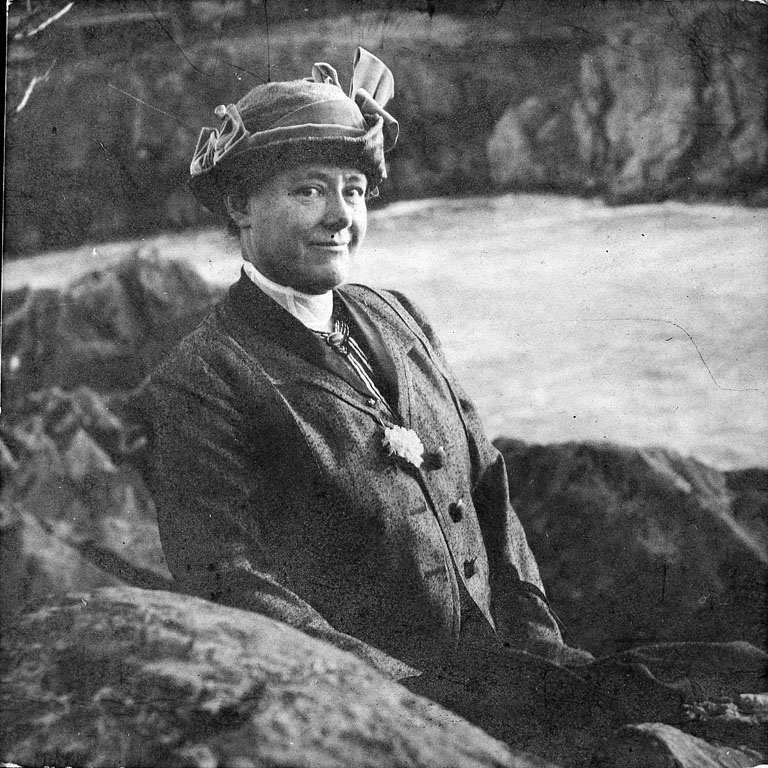
Mary Vaux in 1914

The influx of visitors to the glacier brought both mountaineers and glaciologists. The first recorded ascent of the glacier was by A. O. Wheeler with Edward Feuz and Charles Clarke in 1901, although it had most likely been climbed earlier. Wheeler and the Alpine Club of Canada built the Arthur O. Wheeler hut near Glacier House for mountaineering use. Feuz was one of several Swiss guides hired by the CPR to accompany visitors to the glacier and up nearby peaks.

=== Vaux family ===
The Vaux family were well-off Quakers from Pennsylvania. The family first visited Glacier House and Illecillewaet Glacier in 1887. On a subsequent trip, they noticed a visible retreat of the glacier's terminus. The Vaux children, William, George, Jr., and Mary (later Mary Vaux Walcott) were amateur photographers and began a study of the glacier using pictures taken from fixed points. William and George, Jr. presented their findings to the National Academy of Sciences in the U.S. Their study and methods were considered a "breakthrough" in the new field of glaciology. Mary Vaux would continue to visit the area every summer until her death in 1940.

On a more anecdotal level, the Vaux family carefully photographed the glacier and surrounding area, first using glass plates which were transported up and down the mountain and sent back to Philadelphia; and later more modern Mamiya medium format cameras. There is continuing photographic evidence to support their more scientific measurements. George Vaux, Jr.'s grandson Henry Vaux, Jr., (also an alpine photographer) noted the static nature of the glacier's alpine area, related to its short growing seasons. The only two major differences between contemporary times and the early 1900s are the retreat of the glacier and the presence of the Trans-Canada Highway. Thus, he saw trees that were observed by his grandfather from the same perspective, and there is little difference "except for the glaciers, most of which are back at least two kilometres, and of man-made things." (Note: There are also other organizations that have compiled photographic records. Unfortunately, there have been lapses in the coverage, and discontinuity in the landmarking system. "Photographs of the Terminus". A researcher's guide to the Illecillewaet Glacier. Whyte Museum of the Canadian Rockies. Archived from the original on 4 July 2008.)

=== Trans Canada Highway ===
In 1916, the CPR constructed the Connaught Tunnel, which bypassed the Glacier House site. The numbers of visitors declined, and, in 1925, the hotel was closed. It was demolished in 1929. For a thirty-year period, the previously popular glacier was mostly unvisited. In 1962, the new Trans Canada Highway was completed and its route closely followed that of the original CPR line. Once again, Illecillewaet was joined with a major transportation route. Parks Canada began to improve facilities at the glacier; the Illecillewaet campground was opened and new trails were constructed giving access to the glacier, now located significantly farther away. The latter half of the century saw more glaciological studies as the glacier's retreat became more pronounced.

=== Glaciological studies ===
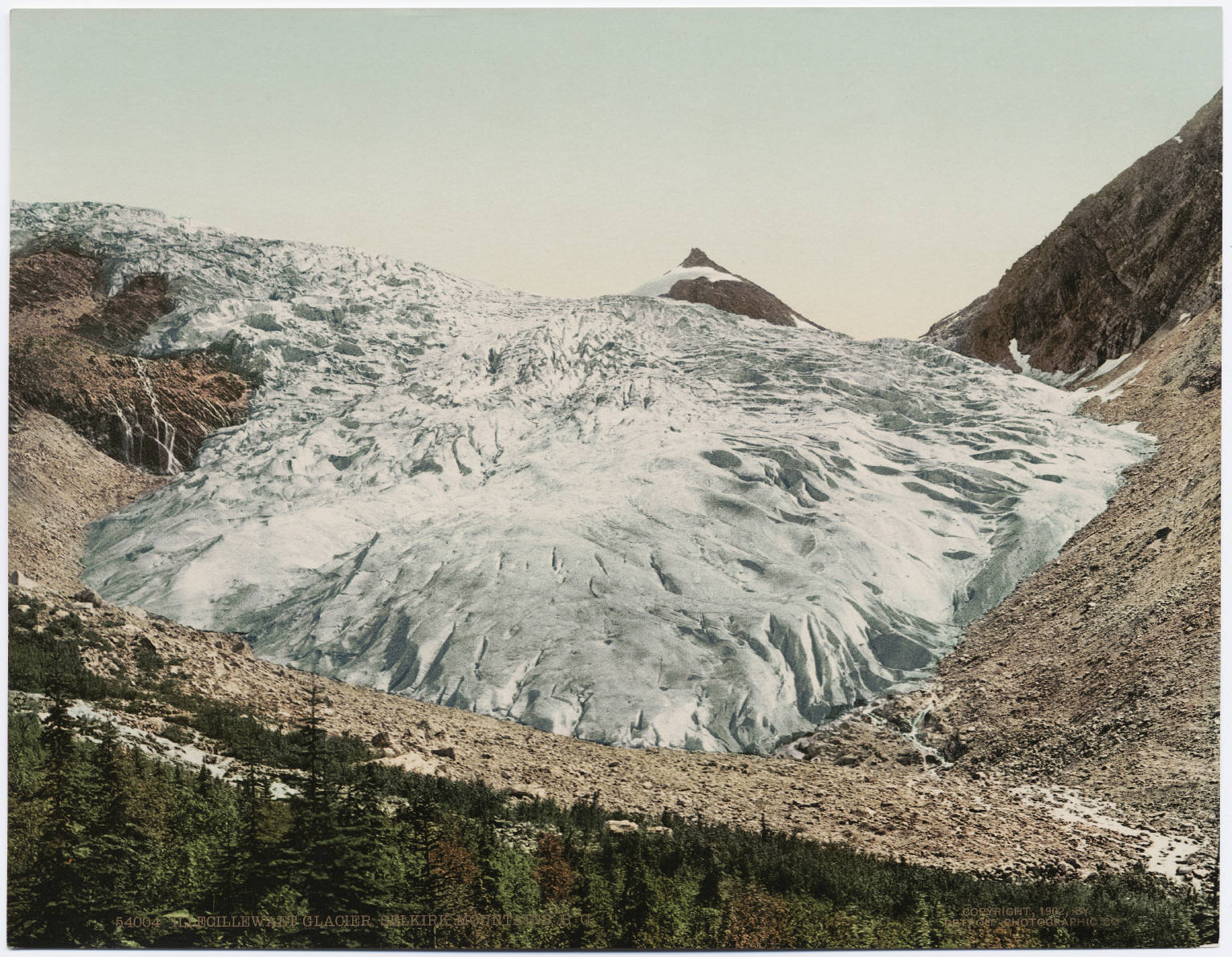
Image of the glacier in the early 1900s

Although sparse compared with studies of European glaciers, studies of the Illecillewaet are detailed by North American standards. The first scientific study of the glacier was performed by the Vaux family from 1887 to 1912. George, William, and Mary Vaux with others, including A.O. Wheeler and C.E. Webb measured the glacial retreat mostly with annual photos from fixed points. The period of World War I and the Great Depression saw fewer observations; the closing of Glacier House in 1925 drastically reduced the number of visitors to the area. The federal Dominion Water and Power Bureau started assessing the glacier in 1945 using baseline measurements. The Bureau conducted yearly studies from 1945 to 1950, and every two years from 1950 to 1960. There were no measurements taken from 1960 to 1972, when Parks Canada began surveying. A study which examines rock lichen in order to determine glacial retreat was begun in 1996. Satellite imagery has also been used to measure the glacier's size.

=== Retreat ===
Since scientific research began in the late 1800s, Illecillewaet Glacier has been retreating and shrinking, with shorter periods of small advances. Between 1887 and 1962 the terminus of the glacier retreated almost 1.5 km (0.93 mi). Parks Canada research indicates that there was a period of advancement from 1972 to 1986, with the terminus advancing 100 m (330 ft). In total, there was a net retreat of 1,433 m (4,701 ft) in the period of 1887 to 1984. The glacier lost about 28% of its mass by 1951; it regained maybe 1% by 1986.

== See also ==
- Canadian Pacific Hotels
