= Elizabeth Parker hut =

Lodging in British Columbia, Canada

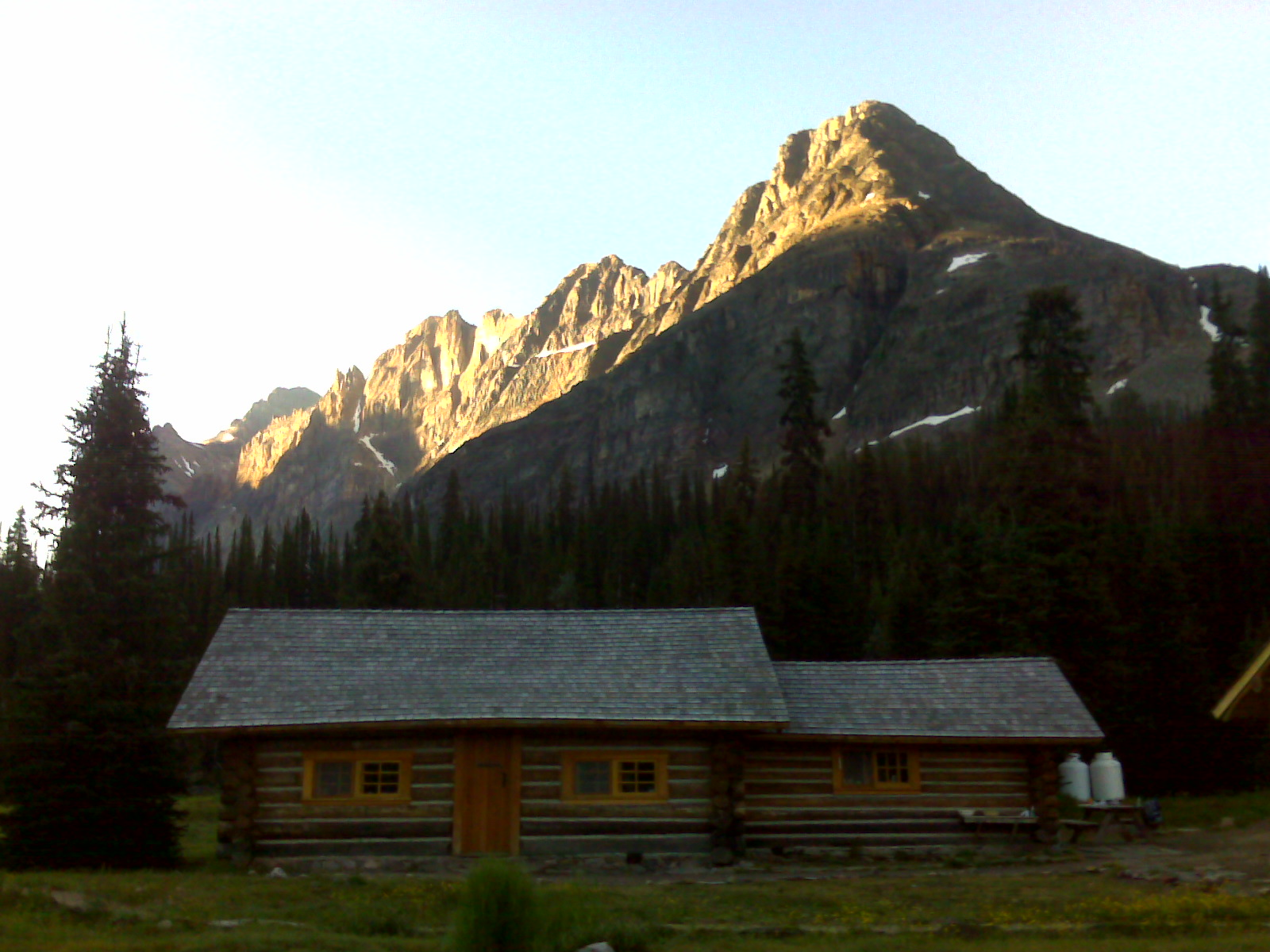
Elizabeth Parker hut

The Elizabeth Parker hut is an alpine hut located in Yoho National Park near Lake O'Hara in British Columbia. The hut is maintained by the Alpine Club of Canada.

== History ==
The hut was named after the journalist Elizabeth Parker, one of the founding members of the Alpine Club of Canada.The log cabin style structures were built in 1912 (Wiwaxy Cabin) and 1919 (main hut).

== Access ==
The hut can be reached via Lake O'Hara Road, South off the Trans-Canada highway from a parking area.

Coordinates: 51°21′18″N 116°20′36″W NAD83 11U 545726 5689508

== Facilities ==
The hut sleeps about 24 in summer and 20 in winter. It is equipped with propane powered lamps, stovetop and oven.

== Activities ==
The hut is used as a base for mountaineering and a starting point for trips to the Abbot Pass.

== Nearby ==
- Lake O'Hara
- Abbot Pass
- Mount Victoria
- Mount Lefroy
- Wiwaxy Peak
