= Jack Wheeler =

Jack Wheeler may refer to:

- John P. "Jack" Wheeler III (1944–2010), presidential aide to Ronald Reagan, George H.W. Bush and George W. Bush
- Jack Wheeler (footballer, born 1919) (1919–2009), English football goalkeeper
- Jack Wheeler (American football) (1908–1990), American football player
- John Neville Wheeler (1886–1973), John Neville "Jack" Wheeler, American publishing executive
- Jack Wheeler, real name of the DC Comics character Wild Dog

== See also ==
- John Wheeler (disambiguation)
