= Thomas Milles (bailiff) =

English customs official

Thomas Milles (1550?–1627?) was an English customs official, known for his economic writings, in which he defended the staple system.

== Life ==
Milles was born in Kent about 1550, the son of Richard Milles of Ashford, by his first wife Joan, daughter of Thomas Glover of Ashford, and sister of Robert Glover. Educated at a free school, he entered public service about 1570, and during the next sixteen years was frequently employed in France, Flanders, and Scotland. He is said to have received a chapeau winged as an augmentation to his armorial bearings for his celerity on a mission to Henry IV of France.

In 1579, he was appointed bailiff of Sandwich, Kent. He was employed by Francis Walsingham as an agent between England and Scotland in 1585, and in the following year he accompanied Thomas Randolph to Edinburgh, during the negotiations on the treaty of Berwick. He then obtained the lucrative post of customer of Sandwich. This position gave him opportunities for the interception of foreign agents and correspondence, and the government employed him in unravelling the plots of the period. In 1591, he was recommended to be sent to Brittany to view and report on the forces there, and after the expedition to Cádiz (1596), he was appointed a prize commissioner at Plymouth. In 1598, he acted as secretary to Henry Brooke, 11th Baron Cobham, Lord Warden of the Cinque Ports, and in the same year (15 June), he obtained, in reversion after Sir Ralph Bourchier, the keepership of Rochester Castle. On the death of George Gilpin in 1602, he applied, without success, for the post of councillor to the council of estate in the Low Countries. He devoted the rest of his life to the defence of the staple system. On his resignation in 1623 of the post of bailiff of Sandwich, he was succeeded (10 July) by John Philipot. His will was proved in 1627.

== Works on economics ==
Milles's economical works show the relation of the doctrines of the mercantilist writers to those of the later canonists. An advocate of the staple system on the ground that, while it made possible exchange without usury, it was favourable to freedom of enterprise and the development of commerce, he denounced the usurious practices of the new school, and argued that the monopoly of the Merchant Adventurers led to the growth of London at the expense of the outports, deprived merchants of free traffic, and diminished the revenue. Two years' experience as customer of Sandwich convinced him of the desirability of reviving the staple system, and after consultation with Thomas Fanshawe, remembrancer of the exchequer, he prepared a statement of his views, which was brought to the notice of Lord Burghley. Failing in this attempt to influence the government, he published The Custumers Apology: that is to say, A generall Answere to Informers of all Sortes (London, 1599). Only fifty copies of this work were printed, and they were circulated among the members of the privy council.

To meet the attacks made upon the Apology by John Wheeler, secretary to the Merchant Adventurers' Company, Milles published a reply. With the exception of the epistle dedicatory, the preface, and the conclusion, this work consists of A Treatise of Exchange in Merchandise and Merchandising Exchange, written about the time of the conference at Bruges (1564–65), by a merchant adventurer. Of two other of Milles's books, A Caution against Extreamity by Farmers (1606), and The True Vse of Port-Bandes (1606), there is apparently no copy in existence. The Caution was directed against the practice of farming out the customs, and Milles was reprimanded by the lords of the Privy Council for it. About 1608 Milles prepared an Answere to the critics of the True Use of Port-Bandes, but its publication was stopped by the Exchequer. Later publications on cognate topics were:

- The Customers Alphabet and Primer: Conteining theire Creede . . . theire Ten Commandements . . . and Forme of Prayers (London, 1608)
- Acroamata [for Bullion and Staples]: that is to say, Private Lessons speld out of a Customers late Alphabet and Primer (London, 1608)
- The Mistery of Iniquity: Discovered in these Acroamaticall Lessons, shewing, by way of Antitheses, the ascention or discention of Summum Bonum and Summa Miseria (London, 1609). This work came through the king's order by Sir Alexander Hay, on his reading the preface to the Acroamata. In it Christian "exchange" is contrasted with Jewish "usury".
- An Out-Port-Customers Accompt . . . wherein he plainely sets downe, as well the motives and occasions, as the Method and Style of all his former writings (London, 1610)

== Other works ==
Milles also published:

- Nobilitas Politica et Civilis (London, 1608): edited from the manuscripts of Robert Glover, with notes and additions by Milles
- The Catalogue of Honor, or Treasury of True Nobility, Peculiar and Proper to the Isle of Great Britaine . . . Translated out of Latyne (London, 1610). This work was begun by Glover and left with Milles, who was assisted in its preparation by Lord William Howard, Sir Robert Cotton, William Camden, Nicholas Charles, and others.
- The Treasurie of Auncient and Moderne Times. Conteining . . . Collections . . . Readings . . . and . . . Observations . . . translated out of ... P. Mexia, . . . F. Sansovino, . . . A. du Verdier, vols (London, 1613–19)

== Personal life ==
Milles married, about 1614, Anne, daughter of John Polhill of Otford, Kent, and widow of William Nutt of Canterbury, counsellor-at-law, by whom he had two daughters: Anne, born in 1615; and a daughter born in 1618, who died young. His wife died in 1624 at Davington Hall, and was buried by the side of her younger daughter in St. George's Church, Canterbury, where a monument was erected to her memory. His daughter Anne inherited Norton, purchased by him in the reign of Elizabeth, and Davington, purchased early in the reign of James I, and married in 1627 John Milles, afterwards knighted.
