= William Wheeler House =

William Wheeler House may refer to:

- William Wheeler House (University of Massachusetts, Amherst)
- William Wheeler House (Victoria, Texas)

== See also ==
- Wheeler House (disambiguation)
