= Albert Canyon =

- Railway point
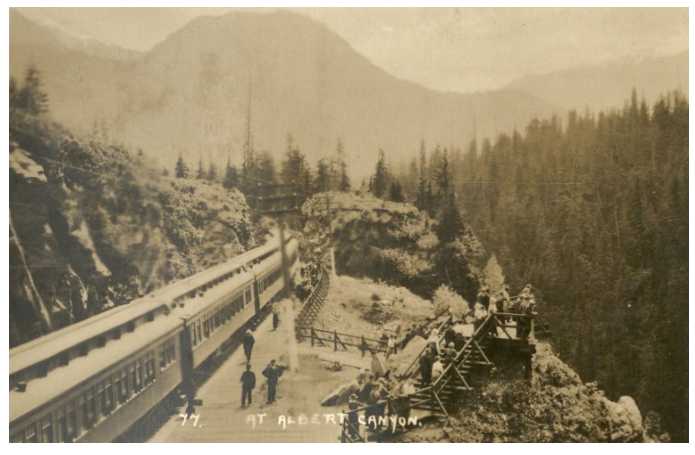
- Viewing platform, the gorge, Albert Canyon, c.1919

- Location of Albert Canyon in British Columbia
- Coordinates: 51°07′54″N 117°52′34″W
- Country: Canada
- Province: British Columbia
- Region: West Kootenay
- Regional District: Columbia-Shuswap
- Elevation: 682 m (2,238 ft)
- Area codes: 250, 778, 236, & 672
- Highways: Highway 1

Albert Canyon is a railway point in the West Kootenay region of southeastern British Columbia. The community was immediately east of the mouth of Albert Creek on the south shore of the Illecillewaet River. That settlement no longer exists, but the Canyon Hot Springs Resort borders to its north. On BC Highway 1, the locality is by road about 33 kilometres (21 mi) northeast of Revelstoke and 30 kilometres (19 mi) southwest of Glacier.

== Explorers ==
In 1865, the government dispatched Walter Moberly to explore from Kamloops to the Canadian Rockies. He was the first European to penetrate the valley of the Illecillewaet, including Albert Canyon. However, the gorge, 4 kilometres (2.5 mi) east of the station, was named after Albert Rogers, who accompanied his uncle, Major A.B.Rogers, on the exploration of Rogers Pass in 1881.

== Railway ==
Albert Canyon, one of the original Canadian Pacific Railway (CP) stations opened to regular service in 1886, was the Rogers Pass, then Connaught Tunnel, western slope base for pusher locomotives, which predominantly assisted eastbound freight trains up the 2.5 grade. The station name derives from the gorge, where the track crosses the south wall of the short box canyon on a narrow ledge. All passenger trains from the late 1880s until at least 1910 made a five-minute stop for passengers to alight and view the Illecillewaet River rushing through the 6-metre (20 ft) wide gorge 91 metres (300 ft) below. A stone parapet later replaced the wooden lookout on a rock outcrop. The final train to stop was in 1939.

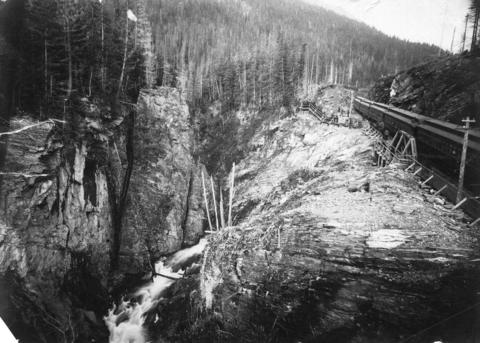
Wooden viewing platform, the gorge, Albert Canyon, c.1890

A dispatcher staffed the station telegraph office. A wye and water tank existed. To satisfy the anticipated mining boom, CP added a long siding westward in 1898, and lengthened the wye southward. In 1910, a spark from a locomotive ignited leaves and timber near the tunnel 2 kilometres (1.25 mi) west. Initially controlled, the fire later spread, almost reaching the section house. Quarries in the area provided ballast for the region.

A 1916 CP building program included a rooming and boarding house, cottages, and a five-stall engine house that replaced an earlier building. CP erected a 91,000-litre; 24,000-US-gallon (20,000 imp gal) oil fuelling tank in 1917, for oil-fired locomotives, and a mechanical coaling plant in 1921, for coal-fired locomotives. The engine house closed in 1940 when the pusher fleet relocated to Revelstoke.

Still operational in 1948, it is unclear when the telegraph office closed. Passenger service ended in early 1965. The section crew probably relocated about this time.

In 1984, CP constructed a 280-metre (930 ft) test section of PaCT track at Albert Canyon to determine its suitability for laying in the Mount Macdonald Tunnel.

A hot box detector operates 1.3 kilometres (0.8 mi) to the east. Prior to double tracking, a siding existed, which measured 73 cars long west and 77 east in the late 1890s, and 97 cars long in 1935.

Built in 1887, the standard-design (Bohi's Type 3) two-storey station building was destroyed in 1971.

Train Timetables (Regular stop or Flag stop)
	Mile	1887	1891	1898	1905	1909	1912	1916	1919	1929	1932	1935	1939	1943	1948	1954	1960	1964	1965
Revelstoke	125.7	Regular	Regular	Regular	Regular	Regular	Regular	Regular	Regular	Regular	Regular	Regular	Regular	Regular	Regular	Regular	Regular	Regular	Regular
Greely	119.5					Flag	Flag	Flag	Flag	Flag	Flag	Flag	Flag	Flag	Flag	Flag			
Twin Butte	115.1	Regular	Regular	Flag	Flag	Flag	Flag		Flag	Flag	Flag	Flag	Flag	Flag	Flag	Flag	Flag	Flag	
Albert Canyon	104.9	Regular	Regular	Regular	Regular	Regular	Regular	Regular	Both	Both	Both	Both	Both	Both	Both	Both	Regular	Regular	Flag
Illecillewaet	98.2	Regular	Regular	Regular	Regular	Regular	Flag	Flag	Flag	Flag									
Flat Creek	93.2									Flag									
Ross Peak	89.7	Regular	Regular	Flag	Flag	Flag	Flag												
Glacier	85.5								Regular	Regular	Regular	Regular	Regular	Regular	Regular	Regular	Regular	Regular	Both

== Mining ==
In the late 1880s, the government built a 13-kilometre (8.25 mi) wagon road from the station, across the Illecillwaet River, and up the Tangier River (then called the North fork) to serve the branch trails to various mines. However, this artery was little more than a trail itself. The road reached the famous Jumbo Mine of Corbie, Kennedy & Co. In 1897, Grant Govan, a mining entrepreneur, initiated a wagon road to the Waverley mine on Downie Creek. The approximate 40-kilometre (25 mi) length appears to include a rehabilitation of the original road. Barry & Ross, the road contractors, completed the project by that November.

The Farm, a hotel, was established 24 kilometres (15 mi) north on the road. Patterson Bros, who were unsuccessful in leasing the Springs Hotel from John H. Skogstrom, built a hotel at the 16-kilometre (10 mi) mark on the road.

When the Waverley mine began shipping ore in November 1897, using horses, mules, and sleighs, proposals were developing to build a narrow-gauge railway line from Albert Canyon to the mine. Soon, more grandiose railway plans emerged for the northward line to connect with the Tangier mine, continue north, then west, and finally south to Revelstoke. The Waverley mine erected a further warehouse at Albert Canyon, and Fred Forrest opened a store at the mine site. A sawmill was installed on the North fork to meet the expected lumber demands. When the avalanche danger ruled out any railway line, the Waverley mine quickly abandoned the assembly of the new concentrator plant at the site. In 1900, the Tangier mine closed. When Goldfields of BC had been floated in 1897 for £2 million, the Tangier and Waverley mines were the prime properties. After the speculative frenzy evaporated, Marble Bay Mines purchased all the equipment (sawmill, compressor plant, concentrator plant, and stores) from the liquidators in 1901 for shipping to Texada Island.

In the mid 1910s, there was some activity at the Waverley mine and other properties, which expanded over the following years. In 1921, Walters Investment Co. purchased the Waverley-Tangier mine properties. Small crews rehabilitated the sites in 1924 and 1925, and active exploration in 1929 was promising. In 1951, 10 kilometres (6 mi) of road repairs to the Tangier site were abandoned because of forest fires. In 1987, geological mapping was conducted at both locations.

== Community ==
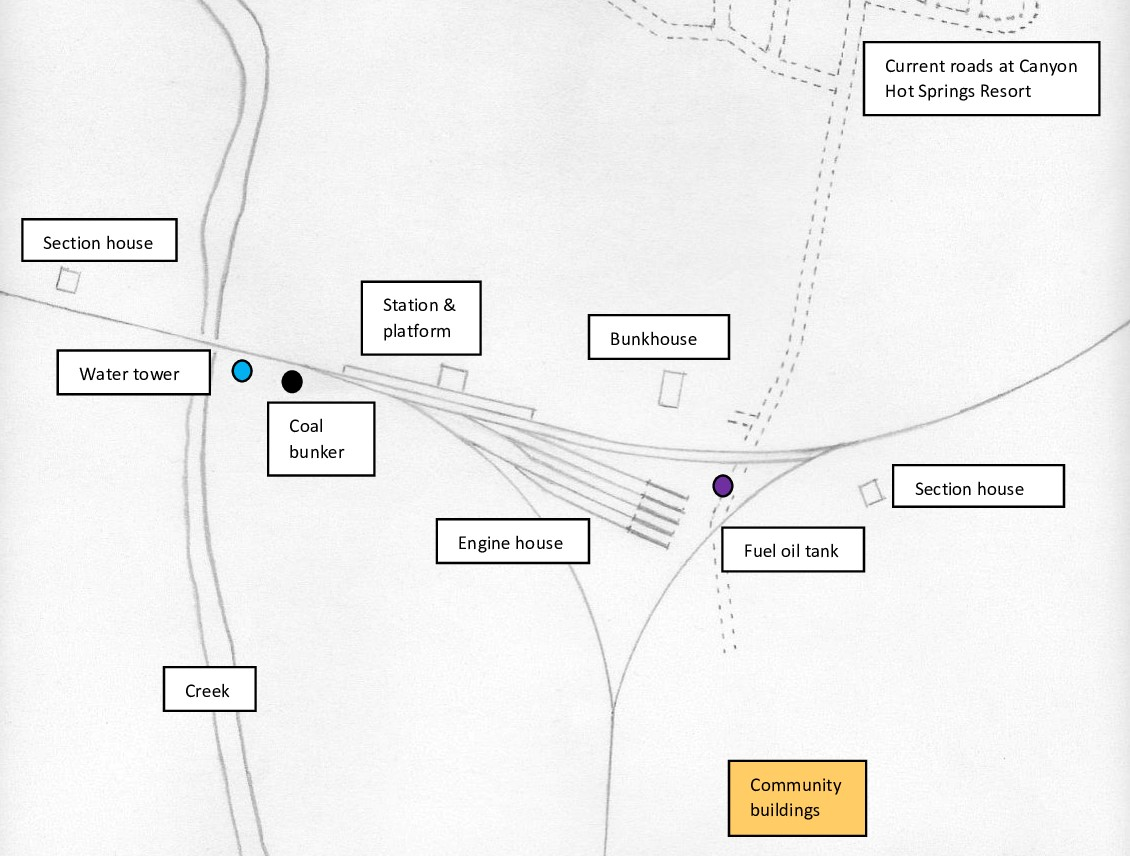
Albert Canyon layout, 1926

A.J. Strand, a mixed farmer, in the Skogstrom & Strand hotel partnership, ran the Hot Springs hotel from the late 1880s. The warm spring for bathing was said, somewhat optimistically, to be a few hundred yards south. At that time, the population was about 25. When Strand relocated, John H. Skogstrom, a farmer, became hotelkeeper in the mid-1890s. That year, Ben Green bought 16 hectares (40 acres) from Skogstrom. Both Skogstrom and Green lost farm produce in an 1896 forest fire that even endangered the station and hotel, renamed that year as The Springs Hotel.

In 1897, Skogstrom built a store. Meanwhile, Green developed mining interests. Expecting an exponential growth in mining, and Albert Canyon becoming a key centre, Grant Govan wanted to purchase 40 hectares (100 acres) from Skogstrom to build the town site. J.P. Kennedy and T.E. Marshall planned to erect a $15,000 hotel. In 1898, Skogstom renovated the Springs Hotel, and sold the store to his nephew, Charles Carlson, who added a storeroom. As storekeeper, Carlson was the inaugural postmaster 1897–1899. William J. White assumed management of the Springs hotel, and the Skogstrom liquor licence was transferred. That year, the community erected a schoolhouse, which was also used as a community hall, and for church services.

In 1899, Skogstrom resumed control of the Springs Hotel, and Carlson leased the store to Andre Maroney, the former section foreman, who became postmaster 1899–1901. That year, Miss Ada W. Griffiths was the inaugural teacher at the school opening. During 1900, Dr. E.C. Paget, vicar of St. Peter's (Anglican), Revelstoke, visited to hold services. Skogstrom appears to have briefly leased the hotel to Carlson. Ben Green became postmaster 1901–1906, most likely after the store had shuttered. In 1903, the two thermal pools and a new changing facility were described as being over 1.2 kilometres (.75 mi) away. By 1906, six houses stood at the gorge, and several tourist cabins existed on the Waverley road. That year, Rev L.E. Gosling, a Presbyterian missionary, resided in the hamlet, while he ministered along the CP line. A.E. Shark was postmaster 1906–1909.

In 1908, a falling tree demolished the hot pool enclosure, but not the pool. Carlson re-established a general store. Entrepreneur, Curtis D. Morris of Rogers Pass opened Canyon House, a boarding house, transferring his liquor licence from the Windsor Hotel at Illecillewaet. A year later, his brother Bernard ran the Springs Hotel. Frank Holder, the CP agent, was postmaster 1909–1927. By 1910, Bernard Morris managed Canyon House, the Springs Hotel was in its final days, and the Presbyterians were holding regular services, which continued into the decade. The Revelstoke Sunday schools held their combined annual picnic for many years at Albert Canyon. By the late 1910s, Graham Thomas was the storekeeper, CP operated the only lodgings, and the population was about 85, soon increasing to 100.

In 1924, the Morris family became the store owner, but Mrs. Jessie E. Crabbe ran the business. The latter was postmaster 1927–1929, and the population was about 60. The Union Mission conducted the church services 1927–1932.

Returning as storekeeper, Charles Carlson was postmaster 1929–1950. The store and CP boarding house appear to have closed in the late 1930s. Throughout the 1940s, the population was just over 40.

A sawmill existed from the late 1940s at least until the late 1950s. After a couple of shorter incumbents, Robert Arthur Woolsey was the final postmaster 1955–1966. A store operated at that time.

During the Rogers Pass highway construction, a camp existed at Albert Canyon. An all-season gravel highway, which linked westward to Revelstoke from 1960, was paved in 1961. The school closed in 1966. By the 1970s, the hamlet comprised deserted buildings. In 1975, the Canyon Hot Springs Resort opened with a pool, campsite, restaurant and store. The cabins came later. The resort receives electricity from the CP transmission line. In 2020, the property was advertised for sale at $10,800,000.

School Enrolment
Year	Pupils	Grade	Ref.	Year	Pupils	Grade	Ref.	Year	Pupils	Grade	Ref.	Year	Pupils	Grade	Ref.
1899‍–‍00	12			1915‍–‍16	10			1934‍–‍35	Operated			1950‍–‍51	16	1–8	
1900–01	19			1916–17	15			1935–36	12	1–8		1951–52	15	1–8	
1901–02	15			1917–18	18			1936–37	13	1–8		1952–53	15	1–8	
1902–03	12			1918–19	16			1937–38	13	1–8		1953–54	15	1–7	
1903–04	14			1919–23	Operated			1938–39	10	2–8		1954–55	13	2–8	
1904–05	Closed			1923–24	Operated			1939–40	8	3–9		1955–56	9	1–6	
1905–06	11			1924–25	Unknown			1940–41	Closed			1956–57	13	1–7	
1906–07	19			1925–26	Operated			1941–42	7	1–6		1957–58	13	1–5	
1907–08	17			1926–27	Operated			1942–43	8	1–9		1958–59	18	1–6	
1908–09	21			1927–28	Operated			1943–44	9	1–8		1959–60	12	1–7	
1909–10	18			1928–29	Operated			1944–45	7	2–6		1960–61	18	1–8	
1910–11	15			1929–30	Operated			1945–46	Closed			1961–62	11	1–6	
1911–12	16			1930–31	Operated			1946–47	Closed			1962–63	10	1–7	
1912–13	15			1931–32	Operated			1947–48	13	1–7		1963–64	10	1–5	
1913–14	11			1932–33	Operated			1948–49	9	1–7		1964–65	14	1–7	
1914–15	10			1933–34	Unknown			1949–50	8	1–9		1965–66	14	1–6	

== Accidents ==
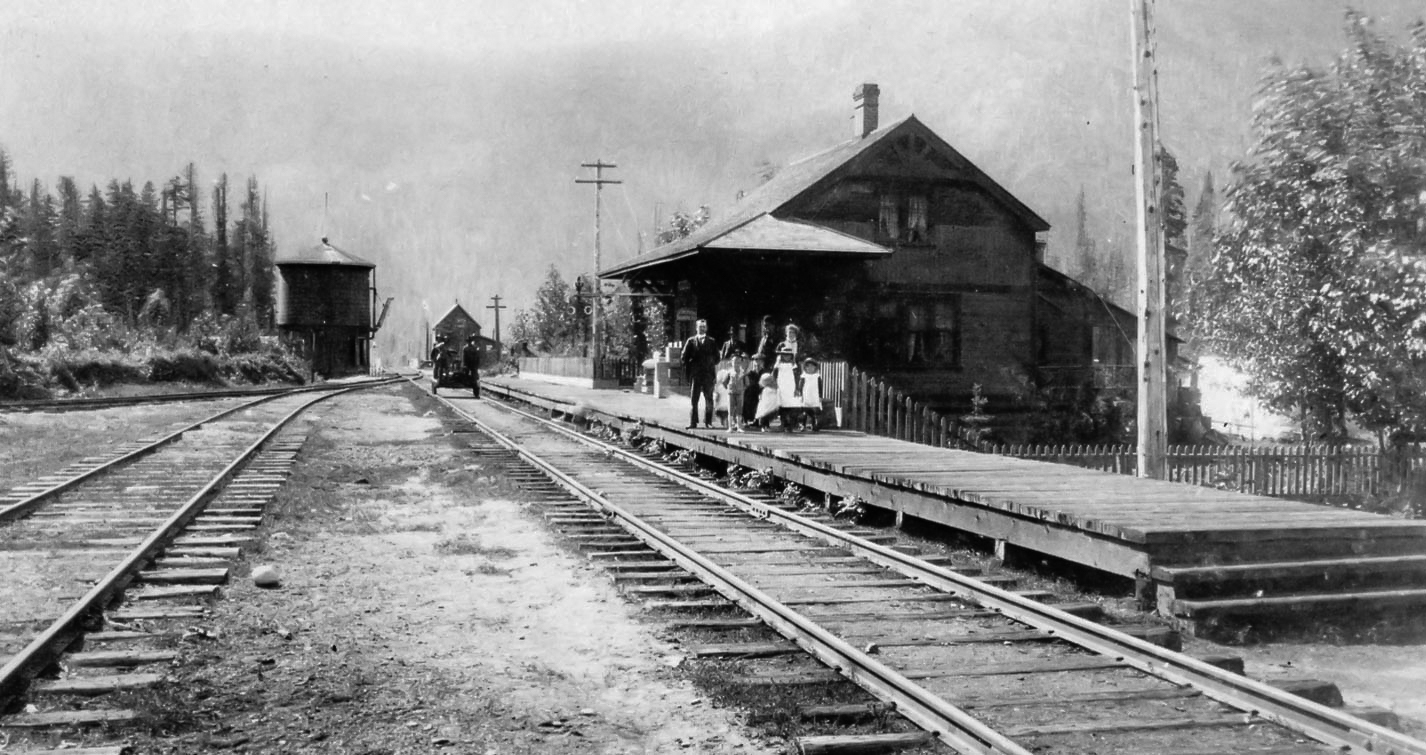
Westward, Albert Canyon Station, 1899

1892: A freight train wrecked in the vicinity.

1894: Just west, an avalanche derailed the tender on a westbound passenger train.

1899: While attempting to board a moving train, a passenger slipped, falling beneath the wheels, where he suffered fatal injuries.

1901: About 10 kilometres (6 mi) west, a five-year-old boy fell from an eastbound passenger train, the wheels severing both his legs. Although found by a watchman, his absence was unnoticed until the train reached Albert Canyon. A relief train found and took the boy to Revelstoke hospital, where a double amputation was successfully performed.

1902: The engineer and fireman were found negligent when a locomotive and eight cars of a westbound freight train derailed, tearing up part of the station platform. The engineer sustained burns and other crew members bruises.

1903: The fireman was scalded when an avalanche derailed a locomotive and one car.

1904: A second avalanche killed two workers, and injured several others, while clearing an earlier slide.

1905: A freight locomotive derailed in the vicinity.

1906: Three miles east, the wheels of a construction train fatally crushed the spine of a section hand who was crossing beneath a car when it began to move.

1908: When an avalanche swept two section crew boarding cars from the track, at least five of the 40 occupants died.

1910: An avalanche struck a car carrying senior staff being hauled by a rotary snowplow in the area. Although the car tumbled down an embankment, the occupants sustained only bruises.

1912: An avalanche toppled the locomotive and three cars of a wrecking train, killing one occupant and injuring three others.

1928: Upending two boarding cars, an avalanche killed four section crew and injured ten others.

1929: At Lauretta, which is 8.4 kilometres (5.2 mi) west of Albert Canyon, one engineer and a bystander died in a head-on collision.

1955: An 80-year-old man did not survive on being struck by a snowplow.

1956: Thirteen freight cars derailed between Albert Canyon and Lauretta.

1963: A boulder on the tracks derailed three diesel engines and a baggage car on a passenger train.

1970: Eighteen cars of a 104-car westbound coal train derailed.

1975: Seven cars of a westbound coal train derailed. The following week, 21 cars of an empty 78-car coal train derailed.

1981: A passing train fatally injured a man walking along the tracks.

2011: Seventeen cars of a westbound freight train derailed just west of Lauretta.
