= Elizabeth Parker (journalist) =

Canadian journalist and mountaineer

- Born: December 19, 1856; Colchester County, Nova Scotia
- Died: October 26, 1944 (aged 87); Winnipeg, Manitoba, Canada
- Occupations: teacher, journalist
- Known for: founding Alpine Club of Canada

Elizabeth Parker (December 19, 1856 – October 26, 1944) was a Canadian journalist in the early 1900s. She attended school in Truro, Nova Scotia, obtained her teaching certificate, married Henry John Parker at the age of 18, moved to Halifax, Nova Scotia and then to Winnipeg, Manitoba. She co-founded the Alpine Club of Canada in 1906 with Arthur Oliver Wheeler.

In 1902, she was working at the Manitoba Free Press (now the Winnipeg Free Press), when American Alpine Club president, Charles Fay, proposed to establish a Canadian chapter of the American club. Amidst nationalistic ideals, she wrote scathing criticism of the idea, and instead helped to establish the Alpine Club of Canada as an independent Canadian mountaineering organization. She and the Manitoba Free Press continued to publicize and support Canadian mountaineering, and with the help of the Canadian Pacific Railway, she organized the founding meeting of the ACC in 1906, at which she became the Club's first secretary. Although she was not herself a mountaineer, Parker participated in many of the ACC camp trips and was at home in the mountains and among the climbing community. She helped lay out the philosophical foundations of the club in the opening article of the first Canadian Alpine Journal (1907): she saw the club as a protector of the environment, "a national trust for the defense of our mountain solitudes against the intrusion of steam and electricity and all the vandalisms of this luxurious utilitarian age; for the keeping free from the grind of commerce, the wooded passes and valleys and alplands of the wilderness. It is the people's right to have primitive access to the remote places of safest retreat from the fever and the fret of the market place and the beaten tracks of life." She envisioned the group promoting scientific study and cultivating mountain art. It was Parker's fondest dream that mountaineering would promote conservation, patriotism, and moral discipline among Canadians.

In 2006, the Canadian government (through Parks Canada) produced a dramatic presentation called "Elizabeth Parker and the Alpine Club of Canada" (written and performed by actor and Parks interpreter Laurie Schwartz) describing Parker's contribution to Canadian mountaineering. The play credits Parker not only with her contributions to Canadian mountaineering, but also "a feminist commitment [that] paved the way for others".

The Alpine Club of Canada maintains the Elizabeth Parker hut near Lake O'Hara in Yoho National Park, named in her honour. Parker Ridge, overlooking Saskatchewan Glacier in Banff National Park, was named after Elizabeth Parker.
