= John Wheeler (cricketer, born 1844) =

English cricketer

John Wheeler (9 December 1844 – 22 September 1908) was an English first-class cricketer active 1873–87 who played for Nottinghamshire. He was born and died in Sutton Bonington.
