= Mary Vaux Walcott =

United States artist, photographer, botanist and naturalist

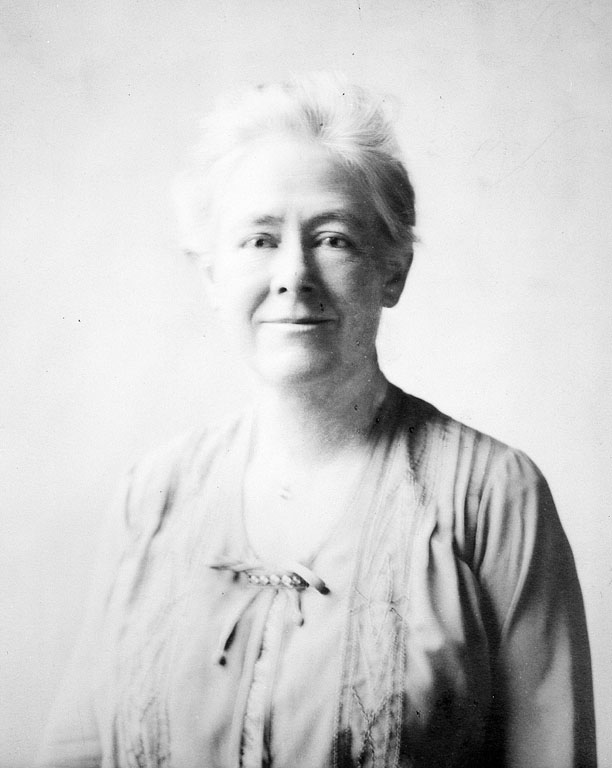
- Born: Mary Morris Vaux; July 31, 1860; Philadelphia, Pennsylvania, U.S.
- Died: August 22, 1940 (aged 80); Saint Andrews, New Brunswick
- Scientific career
- Fields: Botany, Geology
- Workplaces: Smithsonian Institution
- Author abbrev. (botany): M.Walcott

Mary Morris Vaux Walcott (July 31, 1860 – August 22, 1940) was an American artist and naturalist known for her watercolor paintings of wildflowers. She has been called the "Audubon of Botany."

== Life ==
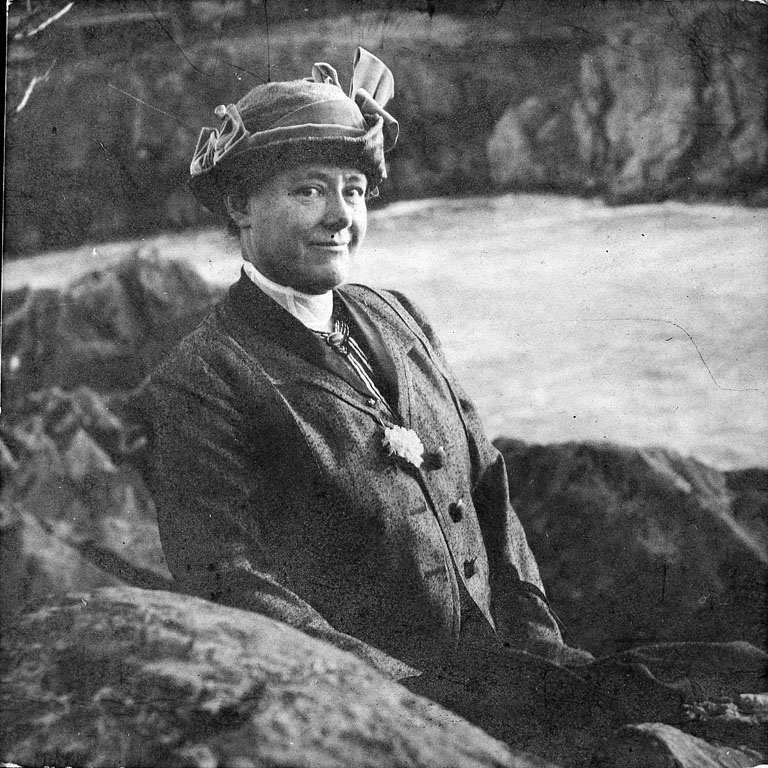
Mary Vaux Walcott, 1914

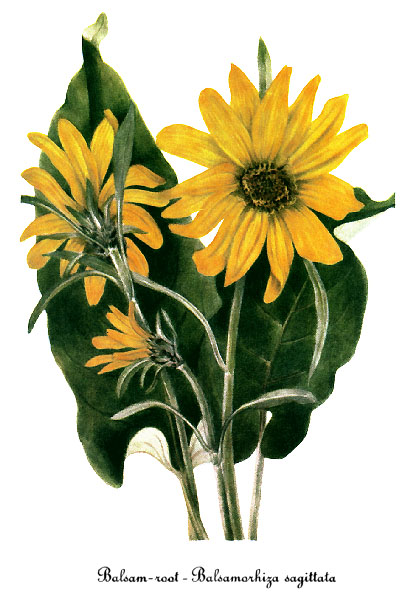
Painting of Balsamorhiza sagittata (arrowleaf balsamroot) by Walcott

Vaux (Note: pronounced "vox") was born in Philadelphia, Pennsylvania, to a wealthy Quaker family. After graduating from the Friends Select School in Philadelphia in 1879, she took an interest in watercolor painting. When she was not working on the family farm, she began painting illustrations of wildflowers that she saw on family trips to the Rocky Mountains in Canada. During these summer trips, she and her brothers studied mineralogy and recorded the flow of glaciers in drawings and photographs. The trips to the Canadian Rockies sparked her interest in geology.

In 1880, her mother died and at 19 years old Vaux took on the responsibility of caring for her father and two younger brothers. After 1887, she and her brothers went back to western Canada almost every summer. During this time she became an active mountain climber, outdoors woman, and photographer. Asked one summer to paint a rare blooming arnica by a botanist, she was encouraged to concentrate on botanical illustration. She spent many years exploring the rugged terrain of the Canadian Rockies to find important flowering species to paint. On these trips, Vaux became the first woman to accomplish the over 10,000 feet ascent of Mount Stephen. She was a founding member of the Alpine Club of Canada.

In 1887, on her first transcontinental trip via rail, she wrote an engaging travel journal of the family's four-month trek through the American West and the Canadian Rockies.

In 1914 Mary Vaux, then 54, married the paleontologist Charles Doolittle Walcott, a widower who was the Secretary of the Smithsonian Institution. She played an active part in her husband's projects, returning to the Rockies with him several times and continuing to paint wildflowers. In 1925, the Smithsonian published some 400 of her illustrations, accompanied by brief descriptions, in a five-volume work entitled North American Wild Flowers, the proceeds of which went to the Smithsonian's endowment. In Washington, Vaux became a close friend of First Lady Lou Henry Hoover and raised money to erect the Florida Avenue Meeting House, so that the first Quaker President and his wife would have a proper place to worship. From 1927 to 1932, Mary Vaux Walcott served on the federal Board of Indian Commissioners and, driven by her chauffeur, traveled extensively throughout the American West, diligently visiting reservations.

When she was 75, she made her first trip abroad to Japan to visit lifelong friend and fellow Philadelphia Quaker, Mary Elkinton Nitobe, who had married Japanese diplomat Inazo Nitobe.

She was elected president of the Society of Woman Geographers in 1933. In 1935, the Smithsonian published Illustrations of North American Pitcher-Plants, which included 15 paintings by Walcott. Following the death of her husband in 1927, Walcott established the Charles Doolittle Walcott Medal in his honor. It is awarded for scientific work on pre-Cambrian and Cambrian life and history. Walcott died in St. Andrews, New Brunswick in 1940.

== Contributions to glaciology ==
Vaux Walcott studied and documented changes to the Illecillewaet Glacier for 25 years, beginning in 1887. As frequent visitors of the Canadian Rockies, the Vaux siblings observed the Illecillewaet Glacier recede notably over the course of several visits, which would inspire the family to document glacial motion moving forward. Although Vaux Walcott was an amateur glaciologist, her findings were published in professional journals, resulting in the first formal glacier study in Canada. Vaux Walcott's brother William Vaux set up permanent photo points using iron embedded in rock in order to ensure precise year to year photo points for accurate comparisons, and Vaux Walcott's fixed-point photographs recorded the retreat of the glacier. The volume of fixed-point photographs that Vaux Walcott took over the course of her career would allow for accurate comparisons to be made between years of glacial geometry. Her brothers, William and George, presented a paper on their findings to the Academy of Natural Sciences in Philadelphia, and later, in 1907, they published Glacier Observations. Glacier Observations was one of the earliest scientific writings on Canadian glaciers.

Altogether, the Vaux siblings took approximately 2500 photos of the Illecillewaet Glacier, which Vaux Walcott was responsible for developing from glass plate negatives. While as previously discussed, the documentation of glaciers was initially a joint effort between Vaux Walcott and her brothers/hiking partners, George and William, William passed in 1908 and George became increasingly busy and committed to life and law practice in Philadelphia. Despite these challenges, Vaux Walcott proceeded to travel to the Canadian Rockies from Philadelphia alone (on a combination of railroad, ferry, horseback, and foot) to continue her studies.

One of the methods that Vaux Walcott used to measure glacier recession was by comparing glacial positions to fixed lines of rope and boulders. Canadian Alpine Journal published her findings in 1911 noting, “The distance from Rock C to the nearest ice was 426 feet [130 metres], thus making the recession for the year 60 feet [18 metres].” Vaux Walcott also directly measured glacial flow by placing painted red steel plates on the surface of the ice and tracking their positions over the period of a year. Between 1909 and 1910, Vaux Walcott computed a downward glacial flow rate of 3.74 inches per day. The process of tracking down the steel plates was notably arduous, with Vaux Walcott writing in her journal that they tended to get lost in glacial crevasses or deep ice mounds.

== In her own words ==
On field photography:

"A camera is a very delightful adjunct, for it is pleasant to have some tangible results to show, on your return home. A Kodak, if no larger instrument can be managed, yields most satisfactory results, although the better records from a larger-sized camera are an increased delight, when one has the patience and skill to obtain them. For changing plates in camp, an improvised tepee can be made of the blankets, and, if this is done after sundown, is quite satisfactory." - Vaux, writing in "Camping in the Canadian Rockies" in the Canadian Alpine Journal

On measuring glaciers:

""The glaciers must be measured, and I shall hope to use the camera seriously, and get all I can. Last summer's work was such a disappointment in photographic results." -Mary Vaux Walcott, Letters to Charles Walcott, April 1, 1912.

On the outdoors:

"Sometimes I feel that I can hardly wait till the time comes to escape from city life, to the free air of the everlasting hills." -Mary Vaux Walcott, Letters to Charles Walcott, Feb 19, 1912.

== Legacy ==
Upon her death in 1940, Mary Vaux Walcott bequeathed $400,000 to the Smithsonian Institution as an addition to the fund she and her husband, Charles Walcott, created for geological research and publication.

Agathe Bernard's short documentary Carving Landscapes examines Vaux's career and contributions.

A mountain, called Mount Mary Vaux, in Jasper National Park, Alberta, Canada, located at 52°33′0″N 117°27′10″W, is named after her, as is the orchid hybrid Rhyncattleanthe Mary Vaux Walcott.

Mary Vaux shared interests similar to those of artist, photographer, writer and explorer Mary Schäffer, and they were good friends.

== Selected works ==
- North American Wildflowers, 5 vols., pub. by the Smithsonian Institution, 1925, repub. 1988 ISBN 0-517-64269-7
- 15 paintings in Illustrations of American Pitcherplants, pub. by the Smithsonian Institution, 1935
