= Stanley Mitchell =

Stanley Mitchell (12 March 1932, in Clapton, London – 16 October 2011, in Highbury, London) was a British translator, academic, and author, noted for his English verse translation of Alexander Pushkin's Russian verse novel Eugene Onegin.

== Life and works ==
Stanley Mitchell was born in London to immigrant Jewish parents, in a family in which Yiddish was often spoken. His father was born in Ukraine, and his mother's parents were in Belarus. He attended Christ College School in Finchley, North London, which included a period of evacuation to Biggleswade during World War II.

During his national service, he learnt German and Russian and went on to read modern languages at Lincoln College, Oxford, specialising in French, German and Russian. At Oxford he joined the Communist Party and helped to edit the journal Oxford Left.

His specialist subjects were Russian literature and art, comparative literature, art history, and cultural studies. He held teaching posts at the universities of Birmingham, Essex, Sussex, San Diego, McGill (Montreal), Dar es Salaam (Tanzania), Polytechnic of Central London (latterly the University of Westminster) and Camberwell School of Art. At Essex, he was actively involved in the student protests of May 1968, participating in teach-ins as part of the "Free University of Essex".

He was an Emeritus Professor of aesthetics at the University of Derby and held an Honorary Senior Research Fellowship in the Art History department at University College London.

Mitchell was committed to Marxist left-wing politics. He left the Communist party after the Hungarian Uprising of 1956 and the Suez Crisis of the 1950s. He became involved in what became known as the New Left, publishing articles in New Left Review from the 1960s on.

He published translations of works by Georg Lukács, The Historical Novel in 1962, Walter Benjamin, Understanding Brecht in 2003, and Alexander Pushkin. His life's work was a translation into English verse of Pushkin's Russian verse novel Eugene Onegin, commenced in 1966 and published in 2008. In this he has been praised for capturing not only the precise meaning, but also the wit, the grace and the constantly varying intonations of Pushkin's voice. He was working on a translation of Pushkin's poem The Bronze Horseman at the time of his death. He struggled with bipolar disorder and at one time feared it would prevent him from completing a major work.

Stanley Mitchell married Hannah Brandstein in 1957, who died in 1994; they had one daughter and one son.

== Publications ==
- Mitchell, Stanley (March–April 1963). "Romanticism and Socialism". New Left Review. I (19). New Left Review.
- Lukács, Georg (1983). The Historical Novel. Hannah Mitchell (translator) and Stanley Mitchell (translator). University of Nebraska Press. ISBN 0803279108.
- Benjamin, Walter (2003). Understanding Brecht. Stanley Mitchell (introduction) and Anna Bostock (translator). Verso Books. ISBN 1859844189.
- Pushkin, Alexander (September 2003). Eugene Onegin. Stanley Mitchell (translator). Penguin Books. ISBN 9780140448108.
