= John Oliver Wheeler =

Canadian geologist (1924–2015)

John Oliver "J.O." Wheeler (19 December 1924 – 24 May 2015) was a Canadian geologist, who spent most of his career as a research scientist with the Geological Survey of Canada.

== Family ==
Wheeler came from a family of surveyors. His father, Sir Edward Oliver Wheeler, participated in the first topographical survey of Mount Everest in 1921, and later rose to become Surveyor General of India. Wheeler's grandfather, Arthur Oliver Wheeler, mapped British Columbia’s Selkirk Mountains and the British Columbia-Alberta border.

== Career ==
In 1952, Wheeler joined the Geological Survey of Canada. He worked for them for 39 years. He spent the first 20 years mapping the geology of 100,000 square kilometres. The greatest part of this achievement was the Cordillera from northern Washington to eastern Alaska. He also mapped several regions of the Yukon, including the Saint Elias Mountains, and parts of British Columbia, including the Selkirk Mountains. His work has become the foundation of all subsequent Cordilleran mapping studies and set the standard for geological mapping in Canada. In 1968, Wheeler was appointed head of the Survey’s Cordilleran Section.

In the 1970s, Wheeler moved to Ottawa to become a manager. He was promoted to Chief Geologist, with responsibility for the scientific program. In the 1980s he returned to Vancouver to be the General Editor of the new 8-volume edition of the Geology of Canada. He prepared many of the large regional and national maps.

In the early 1980s, he lobbied for establishment of the Lithoprobe project. This 20-year project performed geoscientific studies on and mapped deep seismic transects of Canada’s crust. He served as chairman of Lithoprobe’s steering committee for two years.

Wheeler retired in 1990. During his later years he remainined as an unsalaried emeritus research scientist at the Geological Survey of Canada in Vancouver, and was a lead author of the 2004 Canada-USA collaborative Geological Map of North America.

== Geological Association of Canada ==
Wheeler became a member of the Geological Association of Canada in 1957. He was a Councillor from 1968 to 1972. He served as President from 1970 to 1971.

== Accolades ==
- Elected Fellow of the Royal Society of Canada (1969)
- Logan Medal of the Geological Association of Canada (1983)
- Honorary Doctorate of Science (honoris causa) of the University of British Columbia (2000)
- Massey Medal of the Royal Canadian Geographical Society (2002)
