= Wiwaxy Peak =

Mountain in Yoho NP, BC, Canada

Wiwaxy Peaks
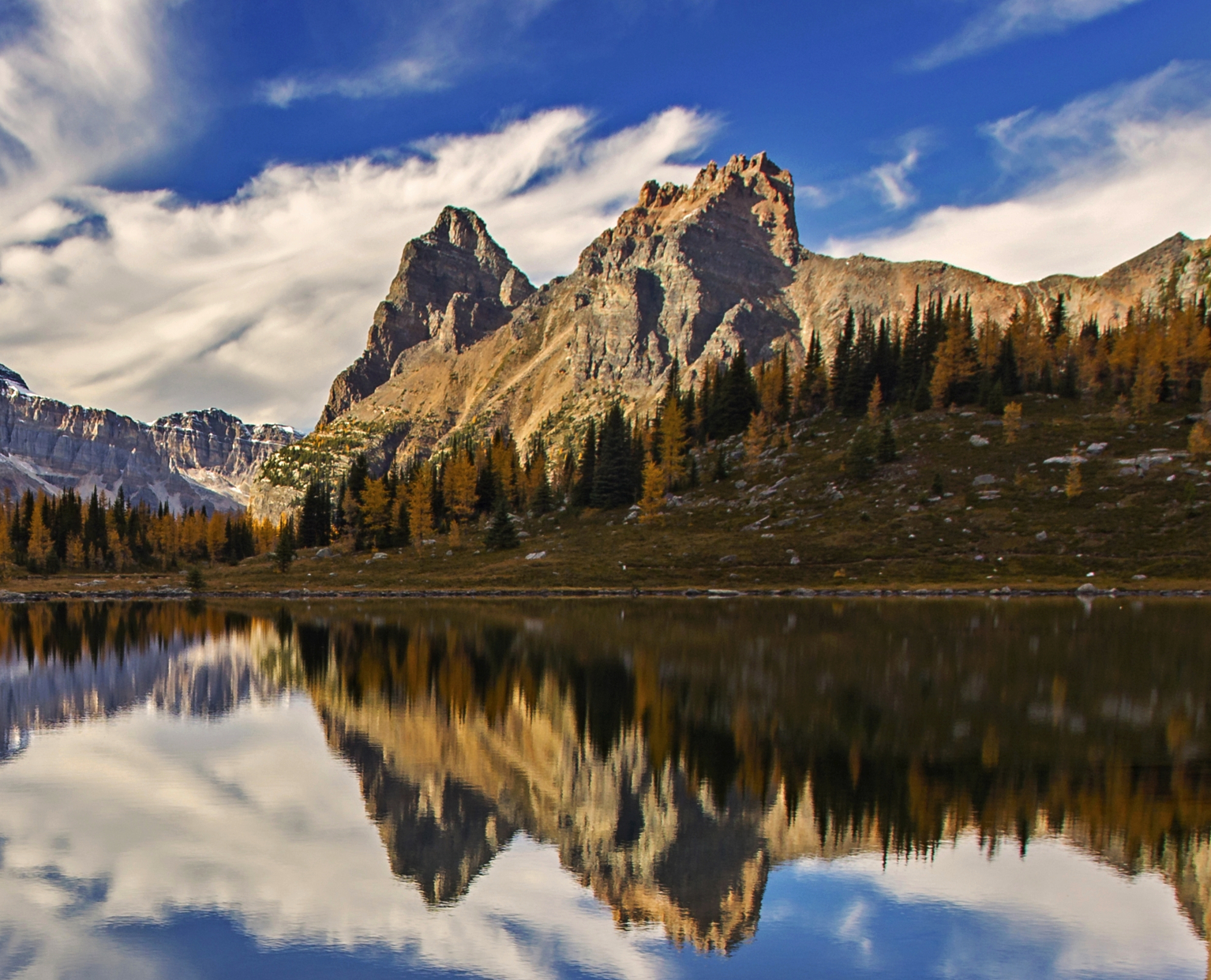
- Wiwaxy Peaks reflected in Opabin Lake

Highest point
- Elevation: 2,706 m (8,878 ft)
- Prominence: 174 m (571 ft)
- Listing: Mountains of British Columbia
- Coordinates: 51°22′0″N 116°19′7″W

Geography
- Location within British Columbia Location within Canada
- Interactive map of Wiwaxy Peaks
- Country: Canada
- Province: British Columbia
- District: Kootenay Land District
- Protected area: Yoho National Park
- Parent range: Park Ranges ← Canadian Rockies
- Topo map: NTS 82N8 Lake Louise

Climbing
- First ascent: 1951 by T. Church, D. Pullin, W.Roubenheimer, T. Whalley
- Easiest route: YDS 5.6 trad

Wiwaxy Peaks is a 2,706-metre (8,878-foot) mountain near Lake O'Hara in Yoho National Park, in the Canadian Rockies of British Columbia, Canada. The Burgess Shale animal Wiwaxia corrugata is named after it. The nearest higher neighbor is Mount Huber, 1.7 km (1.1 mi) to the east.

== History ==
It was named in 1894 by Samuel E.S. Allen for the Stoney First Nations word for "windy".

The mountain's current name became official in 1924 when the Geographical Names Board of Canada approved its name.

The first ascent of the mountain was made in 1951 by T. Church, D. Pullin, W. Roubenheimer, and T. Whalley.

== Geology ==
Wiwaxy Peaks is composed of sedimentary rock laid down during the Precambrian to Jurassic periods. Formed in shallow seas, this sedimentary rock was pushed east and over the top of younger rock during the Laramide orogeny.

== Climate ==
Based on the Köppen climate classification, Wiwaxy Peaks is located in a subarctic climate zone with cold, snowy winters, and mild summers. Temperatures can drop below −20 °C with wind chill factors below −30 °C. Precipitation runoff from the peaks drains into tributaries of the Kicking Horse River which is a tributary of the Columbia River.

== Routes ==
- Grassi Ridge

== Gallery ==
Wiwaxy Peak, from the Lake O'Hara campground

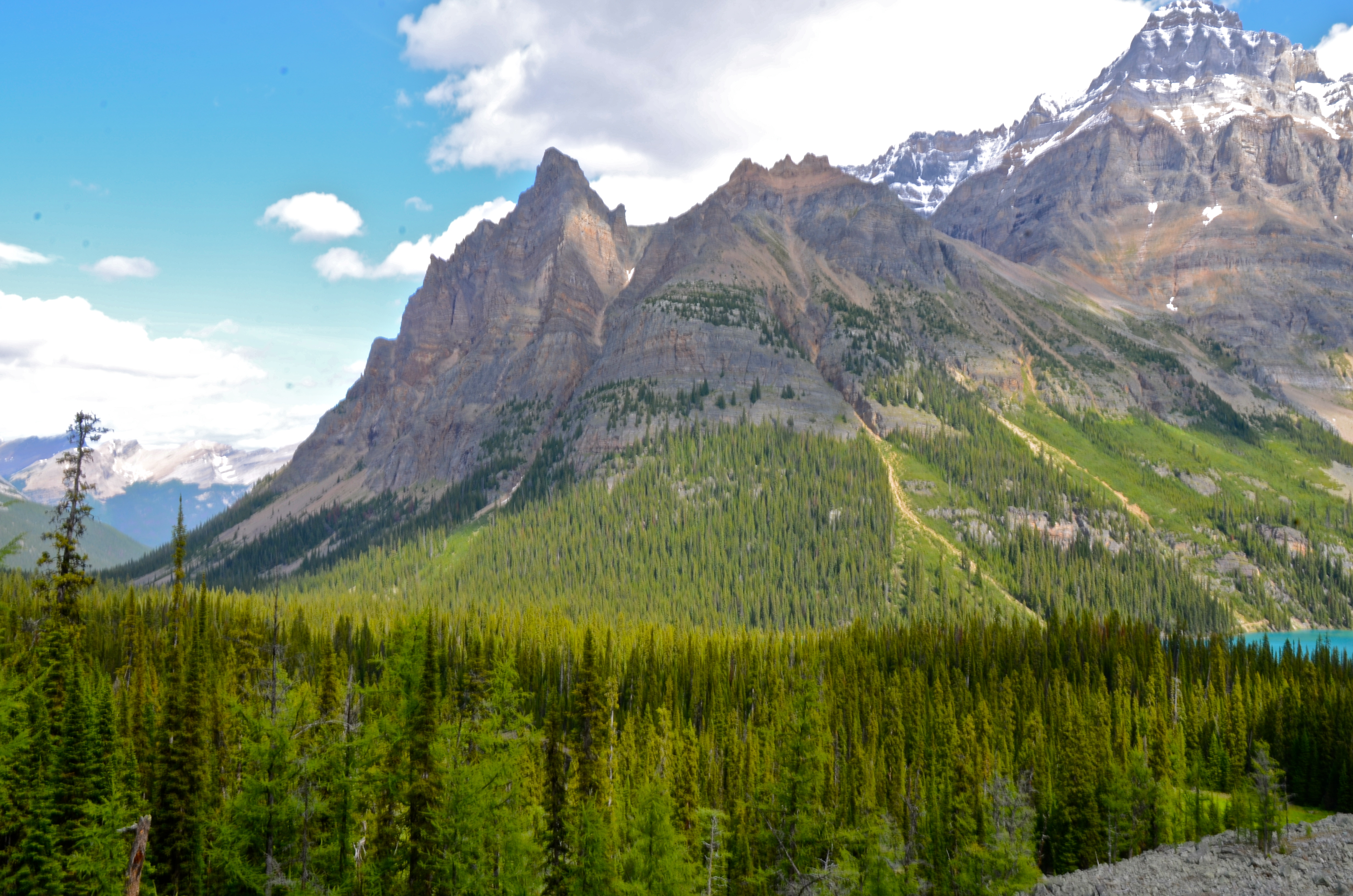
Wiwaxy Peaks and Huber

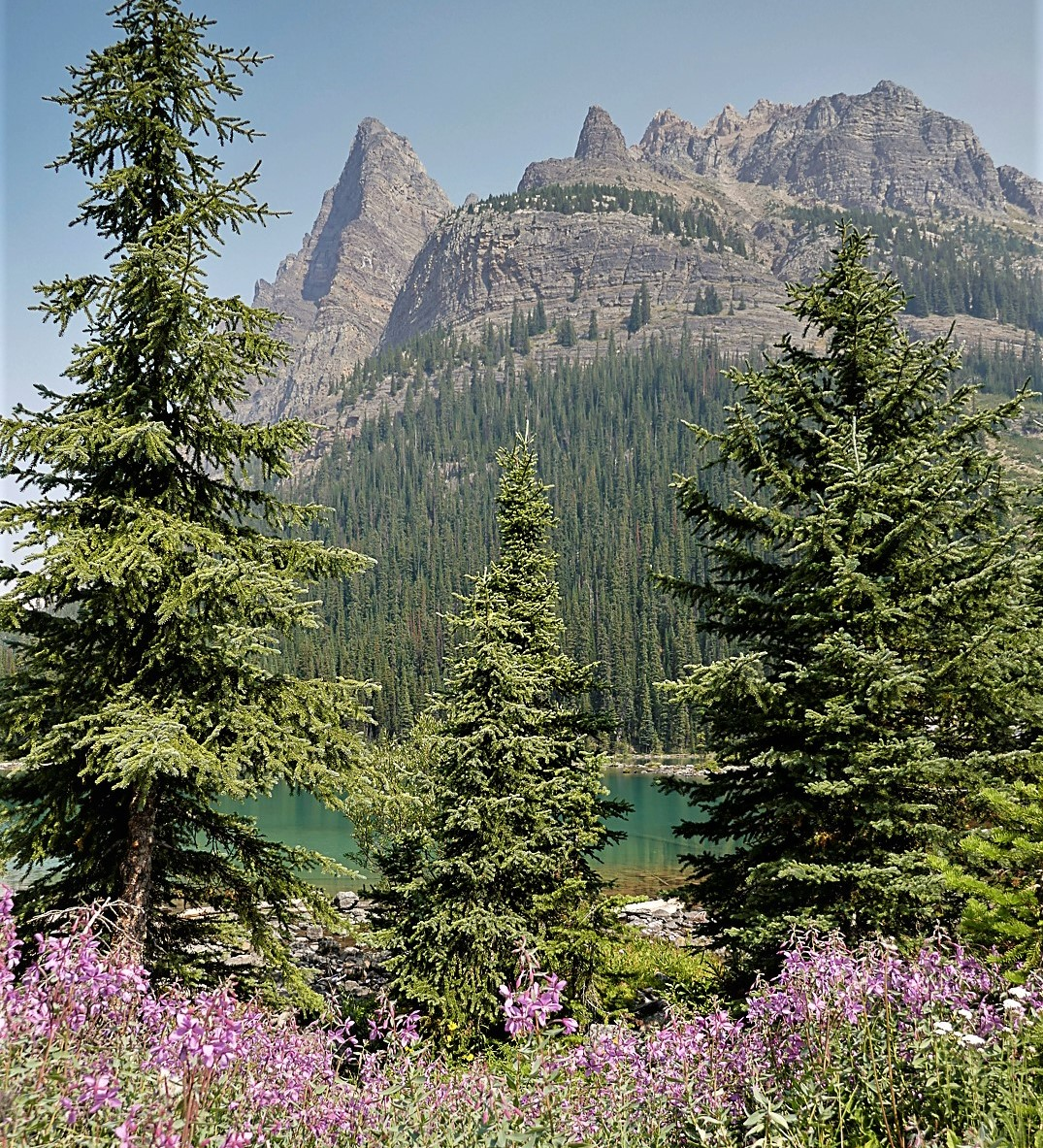
Wiwaxy Peaks

Wiwaxy Peak on a bad-weather morning
