= Albert H. Wheeler House =

Historic house in Massachusetts, United States

- U.S. National Register of Historic Places
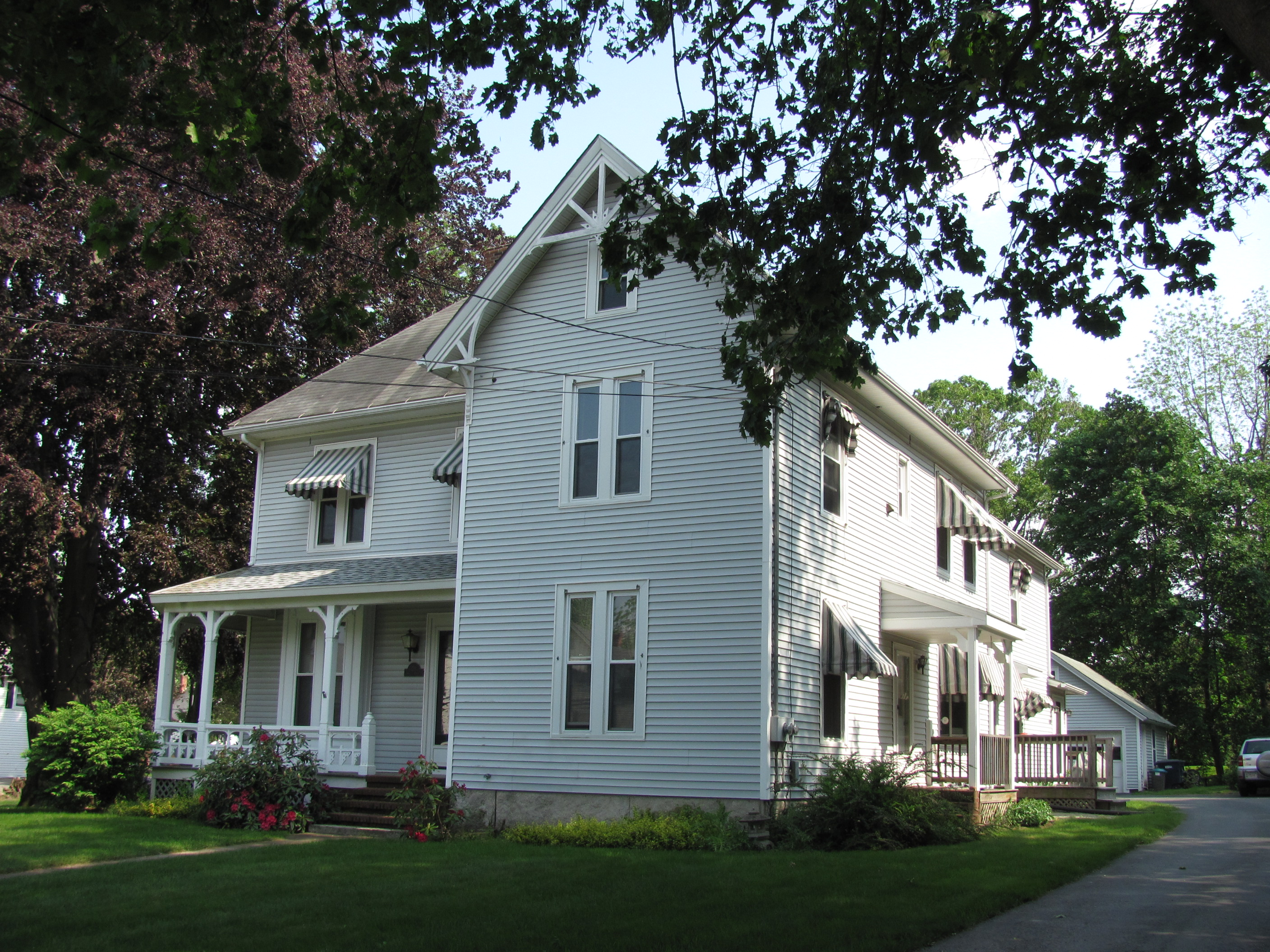
- Albert H. Wheeler House

- Location within Massachusetts Location within the United States
- Location: 219 South St., Southbridge, Massachusetts
- Coordinates: 42°4′34″N 72°2′47″W
- Architectural style: Queen Anne
- MPS: Southbridge MRA
- NRHP reference No.: 89000544
- Added to NRHP: June 22, 1989

The Albert H. Wheeler House is a historic house at 219 South Street in Southbridge, Massachusetts. It was built in the late 19th century, and is an example of a modest Queen Anne Victorian. Its owner, Albert H. Wheeler, was a Civil War veteran and dry goods merchant with a shop in the Globe Village neighborhood. Wheeler died in the 1910s, and his widow lived in the house until at least 1928. It was eventually acquired by the American Optical Company and used for company housing.

The house follows a simple L-shaped plan, with a front porch in the crook of the L that was added in the 20th century. The house was added to the National Register of Historic Places in 1989.

== See also ==
- National Register of Historic Places listings in Southbridge, Massachusetts
- National Register of Historic Places listings in Worcester County, Massachusetts
