= Édouard-Gaston Deville =

French-born Canadian surveyor and pioneer of photogrammetry (1849–1924)

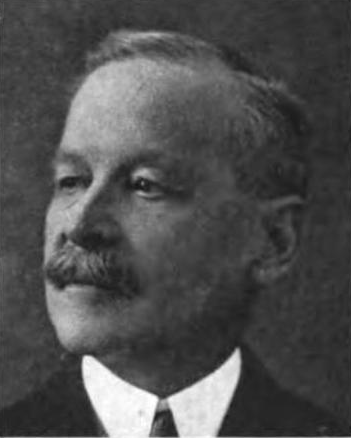
- Born: Daniel Édouard Gaston Deville; February 21, 1849; La Charité, France
- Died: September 21, 1924 (aged 75); Ottawa, Ontario, Canada
- Occupation: Surveyor
- Awards: Person of National Historic Significance (1971)

Édouard-Gaston Daniel Deville, ISO, FRSC (French pronunciation: [edwaʁɡastɔ̃ dəvil]; February 21, 1849 – September 21, 1924) was the first to perfect a practical method of photogrammetry, the making of maps based on photography. A Frenchman who was naturalized Canadian, he was the Surveyor General of Canada (1885–1924) and Canada's Director General for the Bureau of Surveys (1922–1924). During his lifetime, Canadian surveyors had used his phototopography to map 83,678 square kilometres, roughly the size of Ireland (84,421 square kilometres).

== Early life ==
Before Deville moved to Canada in 1874, he had attended naval school, served in the French Navy (reaching the rank of captain) and had conducted hydrographic surveys in the South Sea Islands and Peru.

== Career ==
In 1875, Deville began working as a surveyor and astronomer in Quebec, Canada. He was quickly promoted to the position of the province's top surveyor, Inspector of Surveys. He passed exams in high-level survey theory, earning the rare designation of Dominion Topographic Surveyor. In 1880, he joined the survey for homesteads in the Prairie provinces with the Department of the Interior in Ottawa. For many years, Deville directed Canadian surveying activities. He used innovative techniques to deal with the challenges of surveying in Canada, including a special method of mapping mountainous regions that he invented.

In 1881, Deville was appointed inspector for Dominion Land Surveys. In 1885, he became Surveyor General of Canada.

In 1922, he represented Canada at a geophysics conference in Rome, and his expertise on mountain surveys became sought after internationally. A copy of his camera was used to map the north slope of Mount Everest. His technology was adopted by the Geological Survey of Canada and the International Boundary Commission.

== Inventions ==
To meet these challenges of surveying in the Rocky Mountains Deville experimented with mapping methods developed by French army engineer Aimé Laussedat. Deville used Laussedat's principle of elevated photography, and refined a technique of creating large-scale maps from these photographs. This required him to design a rugged, lightweight field camera that could be carried long distances.

In 1886, his camera was used for the first time in the Rockies. Surveyors would place the camera on a mountain peak, point the lens at the horizon and take panoramic shots of the surrounding peaks. Each view would be measured in relation to the survey station. Surveyors took photos in the short summer season, then would complete their calculations and mapping in their offices during the winter. This allowed larger areas to be surveyed more accurately, in less time, and at one-third the cost of conventional surveying.

In 1893, Deville introduced his innovative mapping technique at the Chicago World Fair. He continued to promote it through pamphlets and a comprehensive textbook. Deville's method of making maps based on photographs became known as phototopography or photogrammetry.

With the arrival of fixed-wing aircraft, surveyors could use Deville's camera to create aerial photographs for surveying flat and remote parts of the country, as well as regions with high elevations.

== Honors ==
- 1882, was a Founding Fellow of the Royal Society of Canada
- 1905, received an honorary Doctor of Laws from the University of Toronto
- 1916, became a Companion of the Imperial Service Order
- 1922, made an Honorary member of Engineering Institute of Canada
- Mount Deville in Yoho National Park, British Columbia is named in his honour.
