= John R. Wheeler Jr. House =

Historic house in Iowa, United States

- U.S. National Register of Historic Places
- Location within Iowa Location within the United States
- Location: 407 S. 3rd St. Dunlap, Iowa
- Coordinates: 41°51′04″N 95°36′11.5″W
- Area: less than one acre
- Built: 1897
- Architectural style: Colonial Revival
- NRHP reference No.: 86003171
- Added to NRHP: November 4, 1986

The John R. Wheeler Jr. House, also known as Immaculate Conception Convent, is a historic building located in Dunlap, Iowa, United States. It was built in 1897 by J.R. Wheeler Sr. for his son and his new wife. Wheeler Sr. was a Civil War veteran, state legislator, local lumber merchant. The house is said to have served as an advertisement for the range of woods that Wheeler marketed. When Wheeler Jr. left the community in 1910, he sold the house to neighboring St. Patrick's Catholic Church for use as a convent. As many as 45 rural students were housed here to makeup for the low church population in town. The parish sold the house in 1973, and it became a private home again.

The two-story, frame, front gabled, Colonial Revival house is symmetrical in plan, with the exception of the wrap-around porch. It features Georgian corner pilasters, pedimented dormers, wooden belt courses, an Adamesque-style cornice with dentils and decorative modillions, and an elliptical fanlight. The porch features columns in the Doric order and a plain dentilled cornice. The house was listed on the National Register of Historic Places in 1986.
