= John Wheeler (merchant) =

English businessman

John Wheeler (died 1617) was an English businessman under the reigns of Elizabeth I and James I.

== Biography ==
Between 1601 and 1608 he was secretary of the Merchants Adventurers of England, an international trading company. In this capacity, he wrote and published in 1601 A Treatise of Commerce, considered both an early example of corporate publicity and "a manifesto of economic nationalism, [...] domestic monopolies and protectionist policies vis-à-vis foreign traders for the power and prestige of the nation".

He is often confused with, but different from, the John Wheeler who was Member of Parliament for Great Yarmouth in the Parliament of 1604–1611.
