= Canadian Alpine Journal =

Magazine

- front cover, 2004
- Categories: Climbing, Mountaineering, Ski mountaineering
- Frequency: Annual
- Publisher: Alpine Club of Canada
- Founded: 1907; 119 years ago
- Country: Canada
- Based in: Toronto
- Language: English, French
- Website: www.alpineclubofcanada.ca/caj/
- ISSN: 0068-8207

The Canadian Alpine Journal is the yearly magazine of the Alpine Club of Canada. It serves as a worldwide journal of record for achievements in climbing, mountaineering, ski mountaineering, and exploration of mountains. The magazine is headquartered in Toronto, Ontario.

Each issue contains feature stories about notable climbs, written by the participants, as well as short notes by climbers about new and noteworthy achievements. Some general articles about mountaineering, mountain medicine, the mountain environment, or other topics are also sometimes included. Each issue includes book reviews, memorials of deceased members, and club activities.

== History ==
The journal was founded in 1907, and during the early decades some volumes covered more than one year. Since 1947 (volume 30), the journal has been published annually.

== Similar journals ==
Other magazines of record for climbing include the American Alpine Journal published by the American Alpine Club, the Alpine Journal published by the Alpine Club (of the United Kingdom), the Himalayan Journal, and Iwa To Yuki, a Japanese journal. All of these journals are often used by climbers planning expeditions, especially those who wish to verify that a proposed route would be a new one. Entries in these journals (and others) concerning major Himalayan peaks are indexed in the Himalayan Index.
