= Fishing knife =

Pocket tool used in fly fishing

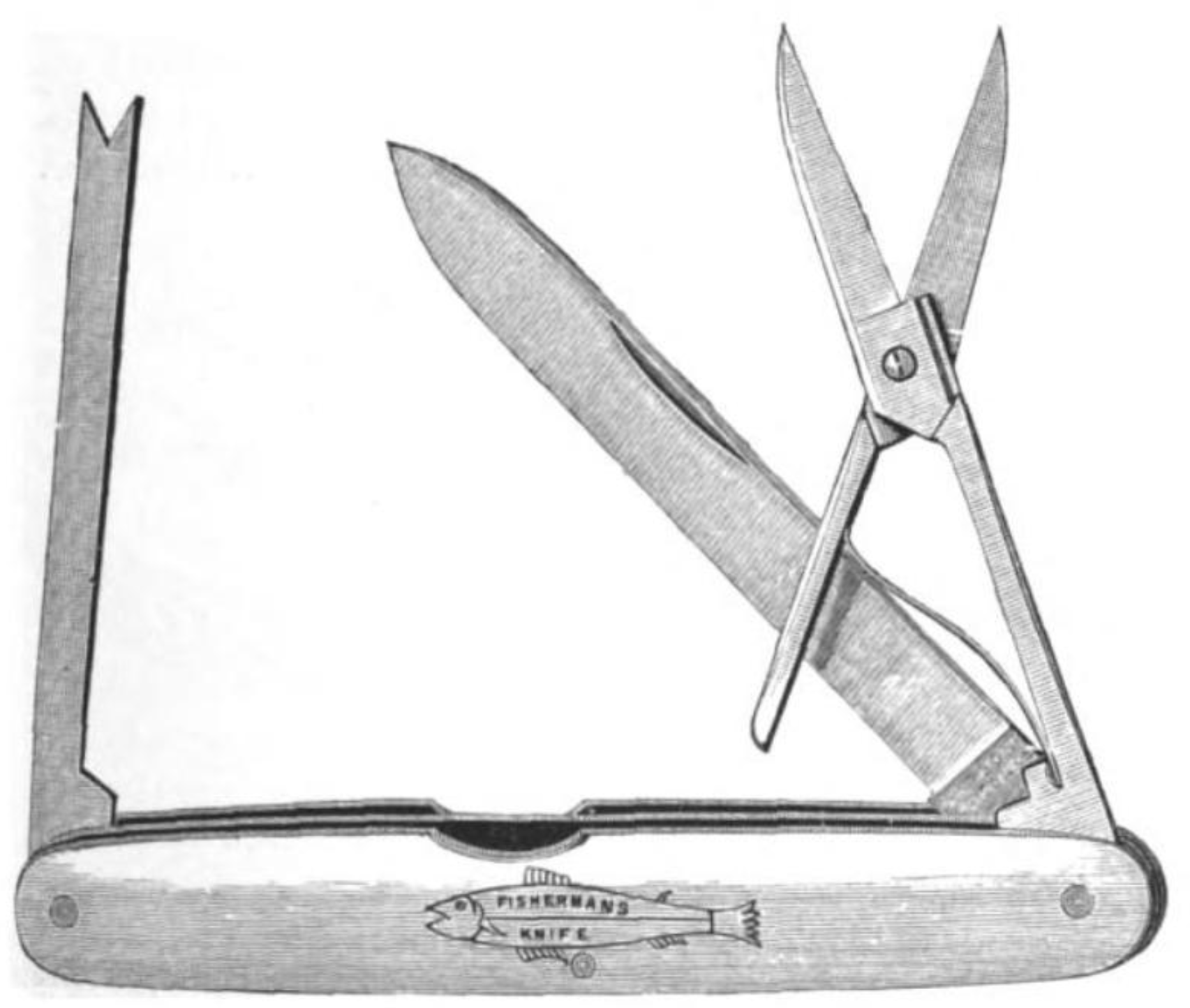
Fishing knife (19th century), disgorger is on the left

The fishing knife is a minor tool used when angling. It is a pocket knife that contains in addition to the knife blade, a disgorger and sometimes scissors. While sheath knives can be used for the purpose, they are not preferred. Henry Cholmondeley-Pennell, an inspector of fisheries, recommended additional implements to be kept inside the handle: a "pricker" for loosening tight knots, a minnow needle, a baiting needle, and suggested the knife to include, "last but not least", a corkscrew.

The convenience of one-handed operation of a switchblade design was advertised in the 19th century as an advantage for fishing (and hunting).

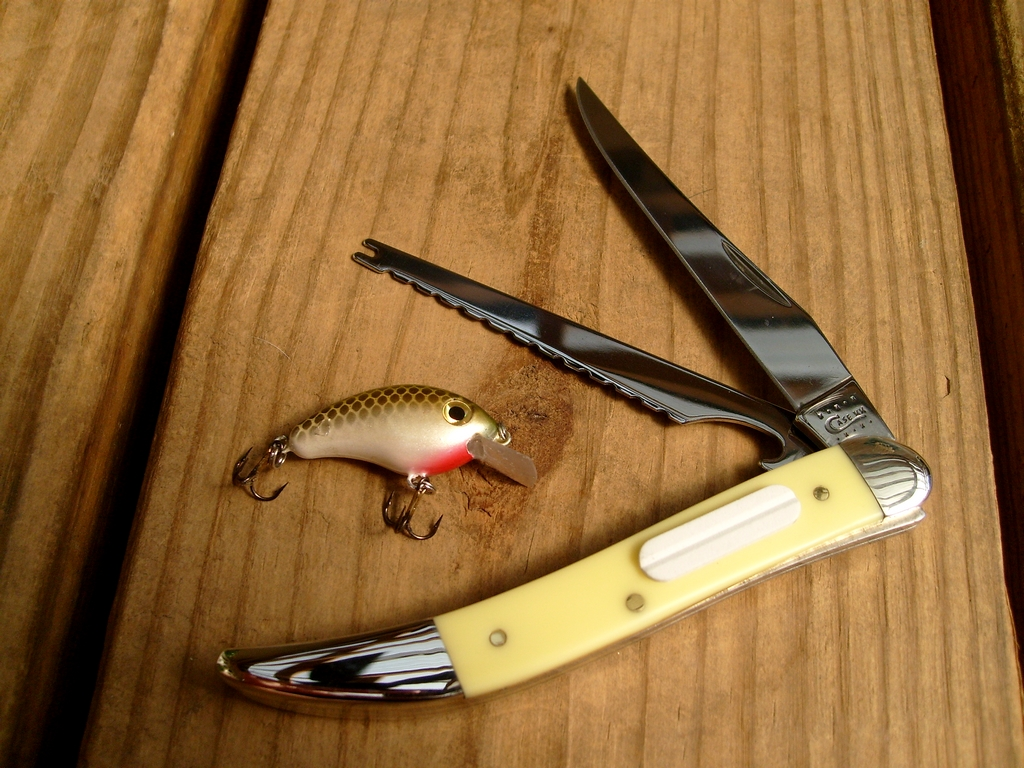
A modern fishing knife with a bottle opener

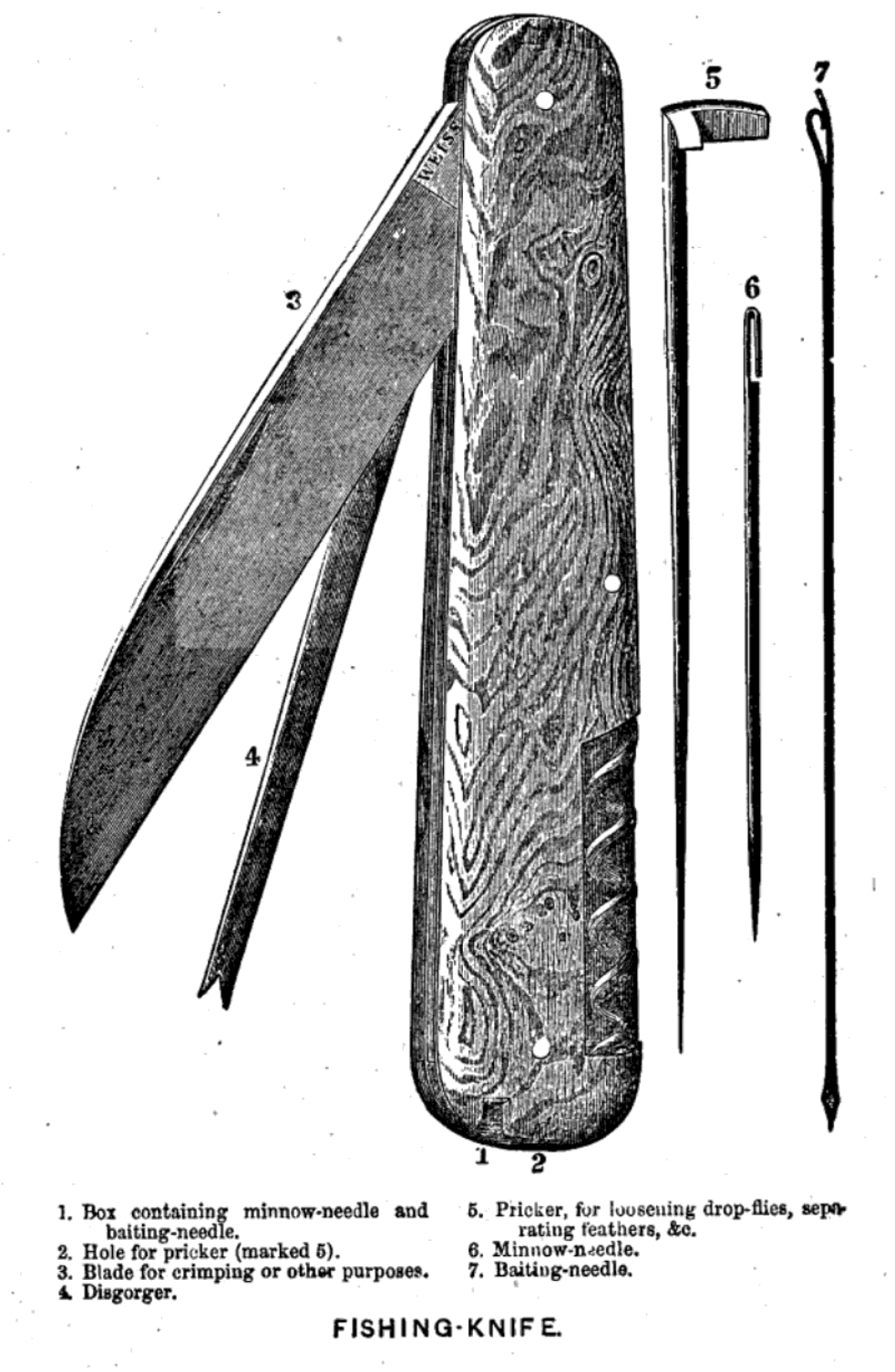
Fishing knife with additional tools, 19th century

== Sources ==
- Cholmondeley-Pennell, Henry (1876). Bottom Or Float-fishing. G. Routledge.
- Cholmondeley-Pennell, Henry (1885). Fishing: Salmon and trout. Longmans, Green, and Company.
- Poltroon, Milford "Stanley" (September 1983). "All About Fishing Knives". Field & Stream. LXXXVIII (5): 25–26.
- Jones, Adrian; Fuller, Dan (2024). "The Evolution of a Social Problem: The Case of the Switchblade Knife". Deviant Behavior. 45 (2): 287–299. doi:10.1080/01639625.2023.2245105. ISSN 0163-9625.
