= Disgorge =

Disgorge may refer to:

- Disgorge (American band), an American death metal band
- Disgorgement (law), a legal remedy
- Disgorger, a piece of fishing equipment
- Disgorging (dégorgement), a technique in sparkling wine production

== See also ==
- Regurgitation (disambiguation)
