= Frano Selak =

Croatian man known for near-death stories (1929–2016)

- Selak in 2010
- Born: 14 June 1929; Dubrovnik, Yugoslavia
- Died: 2016 (aged 86–87); Croatia
- Occupation: Music teacher
- Known for: Depictions about frequent brushes with death

Frano Selak or Frane Selak (14 June 1929 – 2016) was a Yugoslav music teacher, who was best known for his unverified stories about frequent brushes with death.

== Early life ==
Frano Selak was born in 1929, on either 3 June or 14 June, to Slavica and Martin Selak in Dubrovnik. He was born two months premature while his parents were on a boat in the Adriatic Sea while heading for Lokrum. His father cut the umbilical cord with a fishing knife. At eleven months, Selak had life-threatening intestinal problems, which was treated with calcium bromate. When he was eleven years old, Selak's nearly lost his eyesight, with him attributing his recovery to his mother's prayers to Saint Theresa and a nun's herbal medicine. However, Der Spiegel wrote in a 2003 article that nothing extraordinary had occurred in Selak's life before his 32nd birthday.

== Near death experiences ==
As an adult, Selak moved to Bosnia, first working as a music teacher in Modriča, learning how to play the piano and composing. He married and had a son before divorcing and marrying his second wife. Selak's first alleged near-death experience occurred in 1957, when he and a group of students were on a field trip to Odžak. Selak was riding the school bus after dropping the children off, the vehicle crashed into the Bosna river after the steering wheel failed to make a turn, subsequently breaking off in the driver's hands. Because the river was shallow, no one was harmed. The only ones on board at the time were Selak and the bus driver Ahmet, who Selak said "could't drive without half a litre of rakija, but never had accidents [before]". A similar incident was alluded to by Der Spiegel, but placed as having taken place following other near death experiences and otherwise only listed in detail by Croatian media after 2006.

In January 1962, Selak boarded a Ćiro train from Sarajevo to Dubrovnik on return from work. According to him, he was riding with the elderly mother of the mayor of Ston, who had entrusted her into Selak's care. While riding through a canyon near Jablanica during rainy weather, the train derailed after a mudslide caused rockfall to land on the bridge they were on, plunging the train into the Neretva below. Still holding onto his companion, Selak told her to hold onto him and hold her nose with the other before he broke the window of their cart with his elbow and swam towards land, where a male villager from Grabovica pulled them to safety. 17 other passengers drowned, with bodies reportedly found downstream as far as Metković. Selak suffered a broken arm and hypothermia. The incident earned him the nickname Srećković ("lucky one") by friends. In some retellings, Selak made no mention of a companion and stated that he swam to shore by himself. There are no records for the accident.

In 1963, while teaching at a school in Daruvar as part of his service in a military band of the Yugoslav People's Army, Selak received a call that his mother was hospitalized for complications with diabetes in Rijeka. He headed for Lučko Airfield near Zagreb and boarded a DC-8, which was taking off for its first flight with a total of seventeen passengers and four crew members. According to Selak, this was his first and only plane ride. During the flight, Selak exchanged glances with a flight attendant named Rozika and eventually left his seat to talk with her at the back of the plane, at the emergency door. Selak told reporters in 2006 that while over Čabar he heard a loud noise before the exit behind him opened, with the changing air pressure sucking him out. He fell 800 metres (2,600 ft), losing consciousness before landing in a haystack in Parg. According to Selak, he spent four days in a coma and woke up at the Department of Traumatology, where he learnt that he had no fractures or other serious injuries. He told the press that the door was blown open when the tailplane hit the hills of Gorski Kotar near Parg, reading in Vjesnik newspaper that the same strike caused a fire aboard, leading to a crash, with 19 of the plane's occupants being found "charred". Selak stated that the stewardess Rozika also survived, found in similar good health in a tree and recovered with military helicopters. He gave no last name for Rozika, but described her as hailing from Futog in Vojvodina, Serbia, and stated that the two remained friends for life. An early account by Der Spiegel claimed that Rozika, who was not identified by name, had also died as the twentieth victim. There are, however, no records of a plane crash in 1963 matching Selak's narrative. Freelance journalists Hilmar Poganatz and Stjepan Milcic also separately stated that both Croatian and international physical archives contained no mention of such an accident.

In 1966, Selak rode a bus to Split, which skidded off the road and into a river, drowning four passengers. Selak swam to shore with a few cuts and bruises.

According to a 2006 interview with Večernji list, in 1972, Selak was driving on the highway from Zagreb to Bosnia with his wife in their Lada car, when the latter noticed a strong gasoline smell. Selak assured her it was normal, saying "What would a car smell like? Certainly not like chocolate!" before the car caught fire. He was left unharmed besides some singed hair. During a drive in 1973, his wife again noted the smell of gas, though this time Selak pulled over and ran away before the car burst into flames. However, in a 2010 interview with The Daily Telegraph, Selak said that the first incident occurred in 1970, with the engine fire happening first and the interior fire second, with no mention of his wife. Describing the latter incident, Selak said that the engine of his car was doused with hot oil from a malfunctioning fuel pump, causing flames to shoot through the air vents, and that his hair was completely singed in the second incident.

In 1995, Selak was struck by a bus in Zagreb, but sustained only minor injuries. In 1996, he eluded a head-on collision with a United Nations Protection Force truck on a mountain curve between Gospić and Karlobag by swerving into a guardrail, which gave way under the force. Selak was not wearing a seatbelt and was ejected out of the car when the passenger side door blew open, clinging to a tree branch as he watched his vehicle fall 150 metres (490 ft). Selak stated that police and firefighters found and rescued him from the tree.

Selak also headed a jazz band, Mellody, which he described as the forerunner for the band Dubrovački trubaduri. He claims to have composed the song "Stan' Neretvo", which was featured in the 1969 partisan film Battle of Neretva; for "Stan' Neretvo", the composer is credited as Nikice Kalođera, with lyrics from Stevan Bulajić and performed by "Djevojke iz Kupresa" ("Girls from Kupres") and the choir Lado. Selak claimed authorship of several songs that were popular in 1970s Croatia, but a background check showed that his name never appeared in the credits of any.

== Lottery win and international attention ==
On 5 June 2002 or 16 June 2003, two days after his birthday, Selak won a lottery prize of either 6,000,000 (€800,000; £600,000), 6,500,000, or 7,000,000 kuna (€900,000; £702,920; US$1,110,000). Selak variously claimed to have played for forty years before without winning anything beyond four small cash prizes or that the ticket was the first one he had bought in forty years. After this win, Selak married for the fifth or sixth time. He sold his apartment in Zagreb to move to Petrinja, where he built a chapel dedicated to the Virgin Mary, attributing her protection to his survival. Besides the Petrinja property, he bought a boat, a weekend house in Senj for €120,000 and two apartments on Čiovo for €100,000 each, the latter being of ultimately lower value since the flats lacked windows.

Selak first gained fame for his stories in June 2003, after an interview with The Scotsman.

In 2004, Selak agreed to star in a Doritos commercial for Smith's Snackfood for AU$10,000, but first relented because he did not want to travel to Australia, refusing both aerial and nautical transportation. The 45 second ad, in which Selak recounts his near death experiences and lottery win to advertise the MegaWhat raffle while a fire spread to his curtains, was instead filmed near his home in Croatia. Selak stated that the amount of chips he ate were "enough to last [him] for life" and while driving home from the shoot, he hit a deer with his car.

In 2010, Selak decided to give most of the remaining money away to relatives, friends, music groups, and schools, buying the former 25 cars and several cows while providing instruments and furniture for the latter. He sold the Senj house for €70,000 and the two apartments for €30,000 each. He decided to live a frugal lifestyle and live off of his monthly military pension, which was either 1,800 kuna (€240) or 3,000 kuna (€400).

In 2014, Selak had a heart attack while out for a walk, checking himself into the nearby hospital of Sisak, where he spent 18 days before being released. In May of the same year, the New York-based YouTube channel This & That Visuals uploaded a three-minute animation of Selak's claims of near fatal accidents and later lottery win. According to Jutarnji list, Selak himself disliked the video for mixing up details, depicting him with a mustache, and calling him "the happiest man in the world", as he was actually unhappy about his small pension. He was also discontent with the monetization of his story and said the channel could "at least sent me $1000". The main animator, David Ransom, apologised for any offense and said he would "amend the video to more accurately represent his image, and add or remove any details he wants". Selak's wife subsequently told him to charge money for interviews.

== Skepticism ==
None of Selak's near-death experiences have ever been independently verified, and at times some of his accounts of his near-death experiences were inconsistent. Particularly the alleged 1963 plane crash could not be found in any records.

In 2012, a man identifying himself as Selak's son Željko told TheMetaPicture that his father had invented the near-death experiences to receive glory. According to him, Selak only experienced some car accidents and after winning the lottery, he paid a journalist to spread the accounts amongst foreign press correspondents in Croatia. However, the identity of the man claiming to be Željko Selak was also never confirmed. Author Joslan F. Keller was critical of the authenticity of Selak's accounts, citing the anonymous man's allegations, the inconsistencies in Selak's interviews and the lack of records for any of the described incidents. According to Keller, in an interview with Jutarnji list, Selak once talked of only six incidents rather than the usually reported seven, but then added a different seventh near-fatal incident involving a "mule kick" during his military service, never mentioned in previous interviews, apparently to invoke the lucky number seven. An anonymous neighbour of Selak described him as a "pathological liar who invents a new story every day". Journalist Anton Petrović, who was a personal friend of Selak, acknowledged that he did not verify any of his stories, but that the widespread international reporting later convinced him of their authenticity.

Vera Pache of Deutschlandfunk Nova stated that the varying details in the stories are likely the result of circular reporting. She contacted Hauke Goos, the journalist of the first German-language report in Der Spiegel, who told her that Selak had personally told him of his claims in basic German. Hilmar Poganatz, who interviewed Selak shortly after Der Spiegel, noted that he had a tendency to "embellish, change, expand, abridge" his retellings. In Selak's defence, Poganatz said that while the stories were the equivalent of "modern fairy tales", Selak's explanation for the lack of verifiability was that records of the accidents were destroyed in fires during the Yugoslav Wars. A phone interview was partially conducted with Selak, who still complained about his portrayal by the American cartoon and its factual mistakes, though no questions were asked by Pache since Selak demanded €500 (equivalent to $616 in 2023) in exchange.

== Death ==
In November 2016, Dnevnik reported that Selak died aged 87 "a little less than a year ago". Selak's wife confirmed his death in January 2017.
