= History of fisheries administration in the British Empire =

Fisheries authorities in Britain and its empire

The history of fisheries administration in the British Empire covers the growth of government authorities for the regulation of the sea and fresh-water fisheries in the United Kingdom and in its colonies and dominions during the nineteenth and early twentieth centuries. In England and Wales the central authority grew out of the two inspectors of fisheries, at first inspectors of salmon fisheries, appointed by the Home Secretary under the Salmon Fishery Act 1861. The first two, William Ffennell and Frederick Eden, came from the Irish fishery service; later holders included the naturalist Frank Buckland, the historian Spencer Walpole and, from 1881 to 1885, Thomas Henry Huxley. The Salmon and Freshwater Fisheries Act 1886 transferred them to the Board of Trade and made them inspectors of sea fisheries as well, and in 1903 the department passed to the Board of Agriculture and Fisheries. The actual regulation of the English sea fisheries was committed from 1888 to local sea fisheries committees of the county and borough councils, whose by-laws had no legal force until confirmed by the central authority, usually after a local inquiry held by an inspector. In Scotland the fisheries were administered from 1882 by the Fishery Board for Scotland; Ireland had a fisheries board from 1819 and, from 1899, a Fisheries Branch of the Department of Agriculture and Technical Instruction.

== England and Wales ==
=== Origins under the Salmon Fishery Act 1861 ===
By the middle of the nineteenth century the salmon catch of England and Wales had been falling for decades, at a time when the population was growing faster than the home supply of meat. The rivers were fished and used by groups whose interests conflicted: upstream owners and anglers, who wanted the spawning fish protected; downstream owners, whose nets took most of the catch; tidal fishermen; mill owners, whose dams blocked the fish; and factory owners, who used the rivers as drains. The old fishery statutes, some dating from the thirteenth century, had become so confused that the Royal Commission of 1861 found it hard to say what the law was, and magistrates often declined to act on it. The commission, one of whose three members was the Irish fishery reformer William Ffennell, looked to Ireland, where close seasons had been enforced since 1842 and regional boards licensed fishermen. It recommended consolidating the law, suppressing weirs and fixed engines, setting uniform close times, requiring fish passes on mill dams, paying for river management through licences, and appointing central inspectors with a system of by-laws to fit general rules to local conditions.

The government bill lost much of this in Parliament. Conservative members objected to fishery boards as an interference with property and to paying inspectors from public funds; the clause creating boards was dropped, and the Act as passed had thirty-six clauses in place of fifty-seven. It abolished fixed engines and required passes on new dams, but only allowed, and did not compel, owners to fit passes to existing ones. The inspectors it authorised had in strict law only the power to approve fish gratings and no power to prosecute. The Act also renewed the old power of justices to appoint conservators, without giving them defined duties or powers.

For most of the nineteenth century there was in England no actual supervisory staff or fisheries office, and it was not until 1886 that one was created. The Salmon Fishery Act 1861 had, however, made somewhat elaborate provision for the regulation of the fresh-water fisheries, and had placed their general superintendence under the Home Office. Two inspectors were appointed by the home secretary, who, with the local "conservators or overseers for the preservation of salmon", were entrusted with the task of carrying out the provisions of the Act. The first two inspectors were both Irish fishery officials: Ffennell, who had drafted the Irish salmon Act of 1848, and Frederick Eden, a fishery commissioner for Ireland. Both kept their posts as fishery commissioners in Scotland. In November 1861 the Home Office instructed them to visit and inspect the rivers of England and Wales, to consult the owners of fisheries, to decide which fixed engines might stay on the ground of long usage, to examine fish passes, weirs and nets, and to report every March. Their duties were to undertake the inquiries necessary for the administration of the fresh-water fisheries, and to prepare and lay before Parliament an annual report containing a "Statistical Account of the Fisheries, with such other information as may be collected, and suggestions for their regulation and improvement". This, in the words of the marine biologist James Johnstone, writing in 1905, "was the germ of the English central authority". The historian Roy MacLeod describes the two inspectors as the first permanent staff appointed to supervise the fisheries of England and Wales. He notes that a royal commission of 1878 regarded the Salmon Acts, with the later Alkali Acts, as the only Acts under which public money was spent on inspection mainly to protect private property.

The sea fisheries were another matter. The Sea Fisheries Act 1868, which gave effect to the recommendations of the Royal Commission of 1863, provided for their regulation only so far as the preservation of order or the interests of the navigation of fishing boats were concerned. It gave the Crown power to make Orders in Council for the policing of the territorial waters in the interest of the exclusive fishing rights of British subjects; for the registration, lettering, numbering and lighting of fishing boats; and generally for all matters connected with the actual conduct of fishermen at sea, but apart from the actual regulation of the methods of fishing. Commissioned officers of H.M. ships, British consular officers, and officers of Coastguard and Customs had powers to carry out the provisions of Orders made under the Act. Beyond this the Board of Trade's jurisdiction over the sea fisheries extended only to regulating the oyster and shell fisheries and to granting orders conferring rights of "several fishery", that is, the exclusive privilege of fishing on limited portions of the foreshore or sea-bed.

=== The Home Office inspectorate, 1861–1886 ===
The deficiencies of the Act became clear in a year. A fisherman still could catch salmon in the close time and export it to France, so this trade grew until a short amending Act of 1863 closed it. No way was established to pay for watching the rivers, or compensating a mill owner when his dam had to be altered. Ffennell and Eden grasped the obvious: whoever gained from protection ought to help pay for it. Thus they asked for, report after report, for establishment of a local body where every river interest had a say, funded through a combination of water rates (like in Scotland) and the sales of fishing licences (like in Ireland). The Salmon Fishery Act 1865 granted them their wishes. Elected boards of conservators now covered whole river systems; they could charge licence duty on fishing gear and send bailiffs to look over weirs, dams and fixed engines; passes on mill dams became compulsory; and a special commission of three was appointed to settle, once and for all, which fixed engines were lawful. The boards still lacked the power to make by-laws.

Then, inside a year, the office lost both of its men. Eden, ill since 1865, asked to retire. Ffennell, nearing sixty-seven, died in 1867. They were replaced by two very different figures. Frank Buckland, an outspoken proponent of fishing whose books and fishery museum had made fish culture a popular subject, started work in February 1867. Spencer Walpole, a twenty-eight-year-old War Office clerk, followed in March; after being appointed by the home secretary, Spencer Horatio Walpole, who also was his father (MacLeod suggests that the father's recommendation got the son his position). In a wider change, the new inspectors no longer sat as fishery commissioners for Scotland, and the idea of one set of inspectors looking after salmon on both sides of the border came to an end.

The sporting press had declared Buckland too much of an entertainer and Walpole too much of his father's son. In practice the pairing worked out well, and their first joint report was praised as a marked improvement on its predecessors. Buckland looked for facts: how salmon bred and travelled, how badly a river was fouled, which sort of ladder a fish would actually climb. He also began gathering sales figures from Billingsgate and the other big markets, brought in the chemist Edward Frankland to examine river water, and moved his Museum of Economic Fish Culture into the Science and Art Department's buildings at South Kensington, where he could try out new fish passes. Walpole, the quieter of the two, was dealing with gaps in the Acts of 1861 and 1865. In his opinion, the boards lacked real power to supervise their districts. Walpole argued for penalties for anyone who fouled a salmon river, for every watershed placed under a single board, and for every fishing instrument licensed.

Parliament looked at the whole question again in 1869 and 1870, when a select committee under J. P. Dodds, chairman of the Tees conservators, heard witnesses over twenty-one sittings. Most of what it recommended had been recommended before, by the Royal Commission of 1861. The new element was a call for a proper central authority, answerable to one of the departments of state, with power to alter and merge fishery districts and to keep the local boards in step with one another. Until the country's fisheries were thought large enough to deserve a department of their own, the committee said, the salmon inspectorate should go to the Board of Trade. Buckland and Walpole were not keen. They liked the loose rein they had under the home secretary, and feared that a big department would smother the personal persuasion on which their work depended. What came instead was another Act. The Salmon Fishery Act 1873 let the boards make by-laws, provided the home secretary approved them, made their membership representative, and did away with the special commissioners.

From 1873 the inspectors reached beyond salmon. In that year Walpole took over the oyster inspections previously carried out for the Board of Trade by H. Cholmondeley Pennell. In 1875 the inspectors studied the Norfolk crab, lobster and oyster fisheries, in 1877 the crab and lobster fisheries of the whole United Kingdom, and in 1878 the herring fisheries of Scotland. The Permanent Secretary of the Board of Trade, T. H. Farrer, complained that the Home Office was taking up sea-fishery matters without consulting his department.

Two public inquiries belong to this period. In 1878 the home secretary appointed a commission to examine into the state of the fisheries; its members were the two inspectors of salmon fisheries for England and Wales, Buckland and Walpole, and it reported in the following year. In 1878 Buckland and Walpole had also reported, with A. Young, Commissioner of Scottish Salmon Fisheries, on the herring fisheries of Scotland. The commissioners recommended that the powers exercised by the Home Office under the Salmon Fishery Act in respect of the fresh-water fisheries be extended to the sea fisheries, and that the home secretary should have power, after due inquiry, to issue provisional orders restricting trawling in defined areas. To carry out such inquiries some authority was necessary, and they advised that the powers possessed by the salmon inspectors should be extended so as to include the sea fisheries also. This was not done immediately.

One other recommendation of the commissioners led to the Clam and Bait Beds Act 1881, which empowered the Board of Trade to issue a provisional order prohibiting or restricting trawling on any area within the territorial limits where damage might be done to clam or bait beds. To obtain such an order, application had to be made to the board by the representatives of the fishermen or by certain local authorities; then, after a local inquiry by an inspector of the board, an order might be issued, but it required confirmation by an Act of Parliament before it could be enforced, and the expenses of these proceedings fell on the applicants. The difficulty and expense of obtaining powers under the Act were so great that, in Johnstone's words, "it became practically a dead letter"; it was repealed in 1888.

Buckland's proposals for other fish led to the Freshwater Fisheries Act 1878, which extended the salmon close-season rules to all freshwater fish and let conservators form boards for trout rivers, and Walpole's calls for consolidation of the law produced a consolidating Act in 1880. Buckland died in December 1880 after an inspection tour in wet weather; Walpole left in 1882 to become Lieutenant Governor of the Isle of Man. The home secretary, Sir William Harcourt, wanted a man of science rather than a sportsman for the vacancy, and offered the post, worth £700 a year, to Thomas Henry Huxley, presenting it as light work that would leave him time for other pursuits. Huxley took it early in 1881 on condition that he kept his other appointments. After Walpole left he served alone for a year, until Charles Edward Fryer was appointed assistant inspector in January 1883. Huxley's chief piece of work was a study of the salmon disease then spreading in the Conway, which he traced to the fungus Saprolegnia rather than to pollution; he found the hearing of disputes between net and rod fishermen tedious, and he resigned in May 1885. His successor from October 1885 was Arthur Davies Berrington, a former chairman of the Usk board of conservators, chosen to restore the close contact with the fishery boards that had lapsed under Huxley. By 1880 the salmon fisheries were valued at about £100,000 a year, against £18,000 in 1863.

=== Transfer to the Board of Trade ===
The Royal Commission on Trawling of 1885 advised that an authority similar to the Fishery Board for Scotland should be created for England, with money granted annually by Parliament to enable it to carry out scientific work and collect proper statistics. Instead of creating an English board on the Scottish model, the government instituted a Fisheries Department of the Board of Trade and, later, the system of local committees. The Salmon and Freshwater Fisheries Act 1886 transferred the powers and duties of the Home Office, with respect to the fresh-water fisheries, to the Board of Trade, and at the same time made the board take cognisance of the sea fisheries. The inspectors of salmon fisheries were made inspectors also of sea fisheries, and they were required to prepare an annual report to be laid before Parliament, containing a statistical account of the fisheries, with suggestions for their improvement. A definite government department, under the Board of Trade, was thus constituted in 1886, which took some cognisance of the sea fisheries. In making this change, Johnstone observed, "the Government legislated along the line of least resistance".

The transfer took effect in 1887, when Berrington and the salmon work were absorbed into the board's offices. MacLeod finds that the direct dealings between inspector and fishery boards were lost once every decision had to pass through a chain of officials, and cites the chairman of the Severn board, John Willis Bund, who complained of more correspondence and interference and poorer results. The Harbour Department was merged with the Fisheries Department in 1898.

From 1886 to 1903 the Board of Trade contained the department entrusted with the regulation of the fisheries. This central authority was a sub-department of the board which consisted practically of an assistant secretary and of three inspectors of fisheries. It was not directly concerned with the actual regulation of the industry, but exercised a kind of supervisory control over the working of the sea fisheries committees. A great portion of its work consisted of the administration of the Acts relating to the fresh-water fisheries, and this formed the subject of a separate official report. Two administrative series of annual reports were therefore laid before Parliament: the annual reports of the inspectors on the sea fisheries of England and Wales, and the annual reports of the inspectors of fisheries on the salmon and fresh-water fisheries. The sixteenth report of the sea-fisheries series was that for the year 1902. On the salmon side, the board's powers by the turn of the century extended to approving fish passes and gratings, supervising by-laws and licence duties, and certifying the formation of fishery districts. Where Buckland and Walpole had toured the country, the inspector now rarely left Whitehall, and the Treasury refused requests for more staff. Fryer told the Royal Commission on Salmon Fisheries of 1902 that he did not know what a Sunday or a holiday was.

=== Local inquiries and the sea fisheries committees ===
Besides the central authority there was a local regulation of the English fisheries, provided in 1888. Apparently, Johnstone suggested, it was on account of the satisfaction experienced by the government of the time in having passed the Local Government Act of that year that the same principle was applied to the fisheries; there was no precedent for such a course. The Sea Fisheries Regulation Act 1888 led to the establishment of a series of local fishery authorities, to whom the actual regulation of the English industry was committed, and under this Act and two others, the Sea Fisheries Act 1891 and the Sea Fisheries (Shell-fish) Regulation Act 1895, the English system of sea-fisheries regulation grew up. These Acts gave the county and borough councils powers to establish local fisheries committees for the regulation of the industry in defined areas. On application by one or more of these authorities, the Board of Trade (and from 1903 the Board of Agriculture and Fisheries) had power to issue an order for the creation of a district committee, and to define the area of sea-coast and sea under its jurisdiction. Usually this area was that portion of the sea out to the three-mile limit adjoining the coast of a single county, or several such areas, in which case the committee was a joint one. Each committee consisted of a certain number of members representing the county and borough councils within the contributory area, and of at least an equal number of members nominated by the central authority and representing various fishing interests: the local boards of salmon conservators, fishermen, fishing-boat owners, merchants and others.

A local committee was not in itself a legislative body. It might draft by-laws providing for the regulation of the fisheries under its charge, but before acquiring legal force these had to be confirmed by the central authority. A by-law, on being suggested, was advertised and submitted to the board, which might at once confirm or reject it; but usually a local inquiry was held by an inspector, and as a result of this the board either confirmed, or rejected, or suggested modifications of the proposed regulations. On confirmation of the by-law the local committee had powers to enforce its provisions and to exact penalties for their contravention. Much of the work of the central department accordingly consisted in holding local inquiries, either into the necessity for new by-laws proposed by the local committees, or in the consideration of applications for orders conferring rights of several fishery.

In order to carry out the provisions of their by-laws, the local committees might appoint superintendents and fishery officers, and might provide and maintain vessels for the purpose of marine superintendence. These local staffs were quite distinct from the central inspectors, and their strength was very unequal, "as a glance at the last report of the inspectors of fisheries for England and Wales will show", Johnstone remarked. The Lancashire and Western authority had an administrative staff consisting of a superintendent and about thirty fishery officers, and was provided with a steamer and some half-dozen sailing cutters for police superintendence at sea; in 1902 it obtained seventy-four convictions for infractions of the by-laws. In the Glamorgan district during the same year the administrative staff consisted of one officer, and no convictions at all were obtained. The districts of the new committees could take in estuaries and inland waters, and the committees sometimes clashed with the salmon conservators over the methods of fishing allowed at different seasons and over which authority dealt with pollution.

=== Annual reports ===
The function of the central Fisheries Department, Johnstone wrote, might be gathered from a perusal of the annual reports of the inspectors. Apart from the local inquiries, the reports formed the statutory statistical statements regarding the sea fisheries which the Acts demanded. They contained accounts of the working of the Sea Fisheries Acts giving effect to the international conventions, and of those provisions of the Merchant Shipping Acts which referred to fishing boats; returns from the local committees were published, and a summary of the returns made by the collectors of fishery statistics was appended. The Board of Trade had undertaken the collection of fisheries statistics in 1885, a step stated to have been taken on the initiative of the Duke of Edinburgh, then Admiral-Superintendent of Naval Reserves, on whose advice the Treasury consented to an annual expenditure of £500 on the acquisition of this information.

The principal defect in the constitution and working of the central authority lay, in Johnstone's view, in what one might call its intelligence department. The routine matters had apparently absorbed the whole time of the staff, and there had been neither opportunity nor inclination for original observation of the condition of the fisheries; it must frequently have happened that highly technical questions were submitted to the officials of the department with no resources available for their study. The Treasury made an annual subsidy of from £500 to £1,000 to the Marine Biological Association, on condition that the scientific men in its service should advise the board on fishery matters should occasion arise, but Johnstone was not aware that this advice had often been invited. The defect had been noticed very frequently in the reports of public inquiries into the fisheries. "As regards investigation," the Select Committee of 1900 had reported, "your Committee feel that the materials for forming a just conclusion upon such matters are not what they might be."

=== Transfer to the Board of Agriculture and Fisheries ===
During the last few years of the nineteenth century the condition of the department seems to have become very unsatisfactory, and, in response to a widespread demand for its reform, another transfer took place in 1903. Under the Board of Agriculture and Fisheries Act of that year the Board of Agriculture and Fisheries became the department responsible for the superintendence of the English sea fisheries. The change followed a recommendation of the Royal Commission on Salmon Fisheries of 1902, and brought the salmon and sea-fishery work together in one department. When this was suggested, hopes were entertained that the central fisheries authority would be provided with the means for investigation, so that it might form independent judgements respecting the necessity for changes in the law relating to fisheries. Johnstone, writing in 1905, found that this had not apparently been provided for, and that the Fisheries Department at the Board of Agriculture was "not much more satisfactory in this respect than when it was at the Board of Trade". By 1903 the department had a chief inspector of fisheries, who put before the Ichthyological Committee of that year an alternative scheme of North Sea fishery investigation. A number of "reliable captains" of trawlers were to furnish returns of their fishing operations to the Fisheries Department, while sample boxes of fish were to be bought from these vessels at the port of landing and examined by "trained experts", and, if necessary, sent to the biological laboratories.

Looking back over the salmon administration from 1861, MacLeod concludes that a bold start had lapsed into half measures: a short burst of improvement in the 1860s was followed within a decade by slow growth. He puts this down to the lack of knowledge of the natural history of the fish, to the unwillingness of Victorian governments to pay for the research that would have supplied it, and to the routine of the departments into which the inspectors were absorbed.

== Scotland ==
In Scotland the administration of the fisheries was carried out by the officials of the Fishery Board for Scotland, which the Fishery Board (Scotland) Act 1882 had constituted in place of the old Board of British White Herring Fishery. These officials were the secretary, the general inspector, two assistant inspectors, and a staff of fisheries officers. There were twenty-six fishery districts round the coast, in each of which there were one or more officers; the officers had to have been coopers by trade, and had to pass an examination before entering the service.

== Ireland ==
An Act of 1819 provided for the establishment of a fisheries authority and a bounty system on the coasts of Ireland. A board was created, consisting of twenty unpaid commissioners, with a secretary, three clerks and twenty-four inspectors. The years that followed were, according to J. R. Barry, "for long an Irish inspector of fisheries", "a period of unexampled prosperity". Irish fishery legislation was extremely complex, some forty enactments applying to the industry. The foundation of the code was the Fisheries (Ireland) Act 1842, of which the subsequent Acts might be regarded as amending or extending it; a great number of them imposed judicial duties on, and vested powers in, the inspectors. What Johnstone called "an infinitely more hopeful régime" was initiated when the Department of Agriculture and Technical Instruction was created under the Act of 1899. A Fisheries Branch formed an important section of the department; £10,000 was provided annually in the estimates for the expenses of its administration, and two inspectors and a scientific adviser, with several naturalists, formed the staff. William Spotswood Green, the first naturalist to be engaged in the investigation of the Irish seas promoted in the 1880s by the Royal Irish Academy and later by the Royal Dublin Society, afterwards became one of the inspectors of Irish fisheries.

== Notable inspectors ==
- William Ffennell and Frederick Eden, the first inspectors of salmon fisheries for England and Wales (1861–1867), both drawn from the Irish fishery service.
- Frank Buckland and Spencer Walpole, inspectors of salmon fisheries for England and Wales from 1867, who as commissioners produced reports on the herring fisheries of Scotland (1878) and the sea fisheries of England and Wales (1879).
- Thomas Henry Huxley, inspector of fisheries 1881–1885.
- Arthur Davies Berrington, inspector from 1885, who moved with the office to the Board of Trade in 1887.
- Charles Edward Fryer, assistant inspector from 1883 and later one of the English inspectors of sea fisheries, whose critical analysis of the methods and results of marine fish hatching appeared in the inspectors' reports for 1895 and 1897.
- William Spotswood Green, inspector of Irish fisheries.

== See also ==
- Walter Archer, head of the Fisheries Division of the Board of Agriculture and Fisheries from 1903

== Sources ==
This article incorporates text from this source, which is in the public domain: Johnstone's British Fisheries: Their Administration and Their Problems (1905), cited below

- Johnstone, James (1905). British Fisheries: Their Administration and Their Problems. A Short Account of the Origin and Growth of British Sea-Fishery Authorities and Regulations (PDF). London: Williams & Norgate – via Flanders Marine Institute (VLIZ). Digitised from the Cornell University copy scanned by the Internet Archive.
- MacLeod, Roy M. (1968). "Government and Resource Conservation: The Salmon Acts Administration, 1860–1886". Journal of British Studies. 7 (2): 114–150. doi:10.1086/385555.
