= Mount Green (New Zealand) =

Mountain in New Zealand

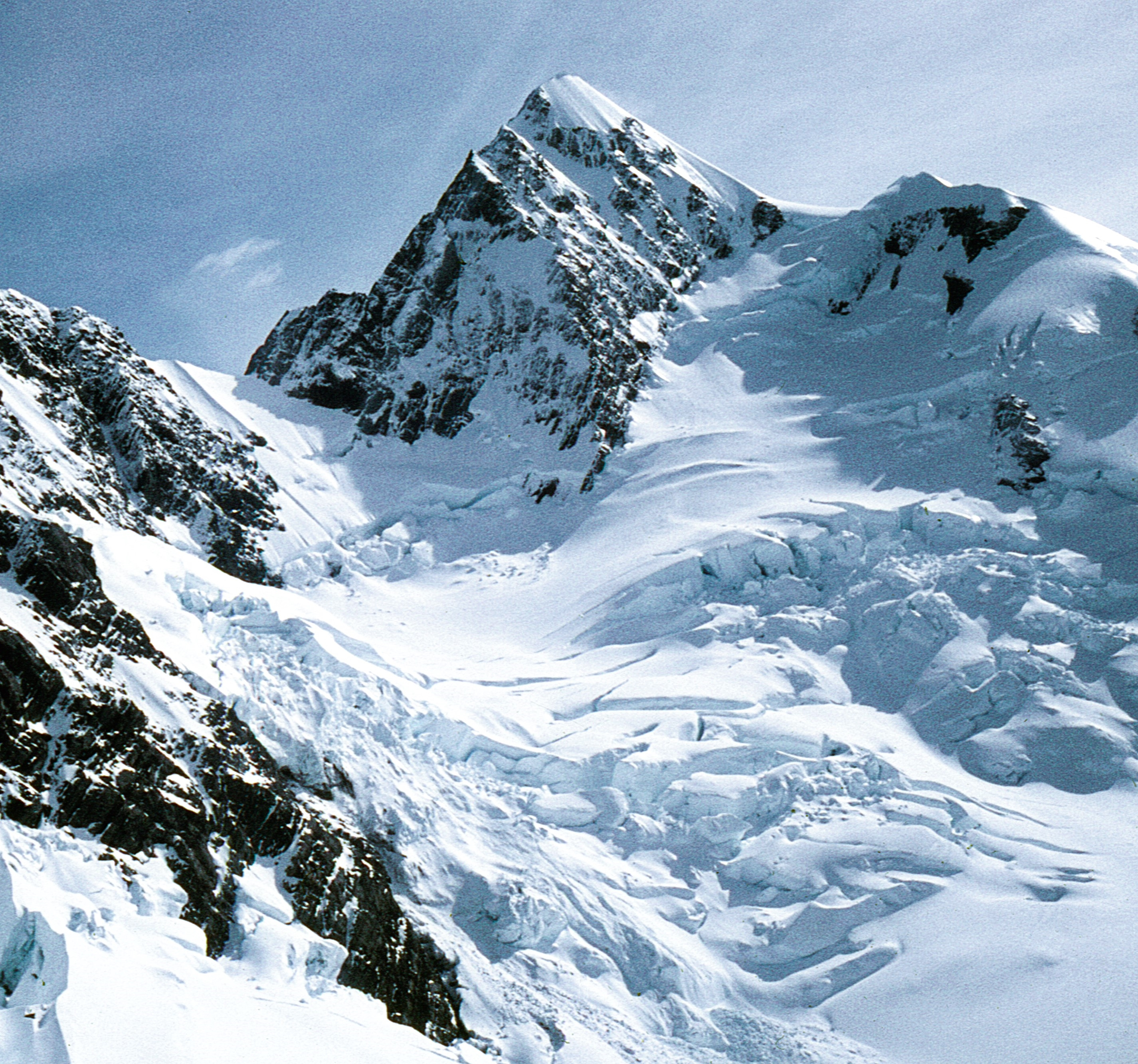
- South aspect

Highest point
- Elevation: 2,837 m (9,308 ft)
- Prominence: 156 m (512 ft)
- Isolation: 1.01 km (0.63 mi)
- Coordinates: 43°29′42″S 170°18′42″E

Naming
- Etymology: William Spotswood Green

Geography
- Location within New Zealand
- Interactive map of Mount Green
- Location: South Island
- Country: New Zealand
- Region: Canterbury / West Coast
- Protected area: Aoraki / Mount Cook National Park; Westland Tai Poutini National Park
- Parent range: Southern Alps
- Topo map(s): NZMS260 I35; Topo50 BX16

Climbing
- First ascent: 1909

Mount Green is a 2,837-metre-elevation (9,308-foot) mountain in New Zealand.

== Description ==
Mount Green is set on the crest or Main Divide of the Southern Alps and is situated on the boundary shared by the West Coast and Canterbury Regions of South Island. This peak is located 17 kilometres (11 mi) northeast of Aoraki / Mount Cook and set on the boundary shared by Aoraki / Mount Cook National Park and Westland Tai Poutini National Park. Precipitation runoff from the mountain drains north to the Callery River and south to the Tasman River. Topographic relief is significant as the summit rises 837 metres (2,746 feet) above the Tasman Glacier in one kilometre, and 537 metres (1,762 feet) above the Edwards Glacier in 0.5 kilometre. The nearest higher peak is Mount Walter, one kilometre to the northeast. The mountain's toponym was applied by Dr. Robert von Lendenfeld to honour William Spotswood Green (1847–1919), who made the first recorded attempt to climb Aoraki / Mount Cook with two companions in 1882, but less than 100 metres from the summit they were forced to turn back due to bad weather. There is also a Mount Green in Canada with the same namesake.

== Climbing ==
Climbing routes with the first ascents:

- East Face – North East Ridge – Alex Graham, Peter Graham, Ebenezer Teichelmann, F.W. Vollmann – (1909);
- West Ridge – D.A. Carty, L.J. Dumbleton, J.D. Willis, D.J. Stanton – (1938);
- South Ridge – D. Dawe, Hamish MacInnes, Dick Irwin – (1956);
- South East Buttress – Ian Cave, Mike Gill, John Nichols – (1960);
- South East Face – Kevin Carroll, John Andrews – (1971);
- The Pink Route – Phil Pitham, Mark Whetu – (1983);
- East Face, Left Hand Trinity – Mike Smith, Tony Dignan – (1986);
- Eaton's Run (West Face) – Greg Duley, Emil Hansen, Don French – (2021);
- Chocolate Cake (West Face) – Adam Sanders, Justin Wimmer – Kevin Carroll, John Andrews – (2023).

== Climate ==
Based on the Köppen climate classification, Mount Green is located in a marine west coast (Cfb) climate zone, with a subpolar oceanic climate (Cfc) at the summit. Prevailing westerly winds blow moist air from the Tasman Sea onto the mountains, where the air is forced upward by the mountains (orographic lift), causing moisture to drop in the form of rain or snow. This climate supports the Edwards, Stevenson, and Tasman glaciers surrounding the peak. The months of December through February offer the most favourable weather for viewing or climbing this peak.

== See also ==
- List of mountains of New Zealand by height

== Gallery ==
Mount Elie de Beaumont (left) and Mount Green (right) viewed from the north.

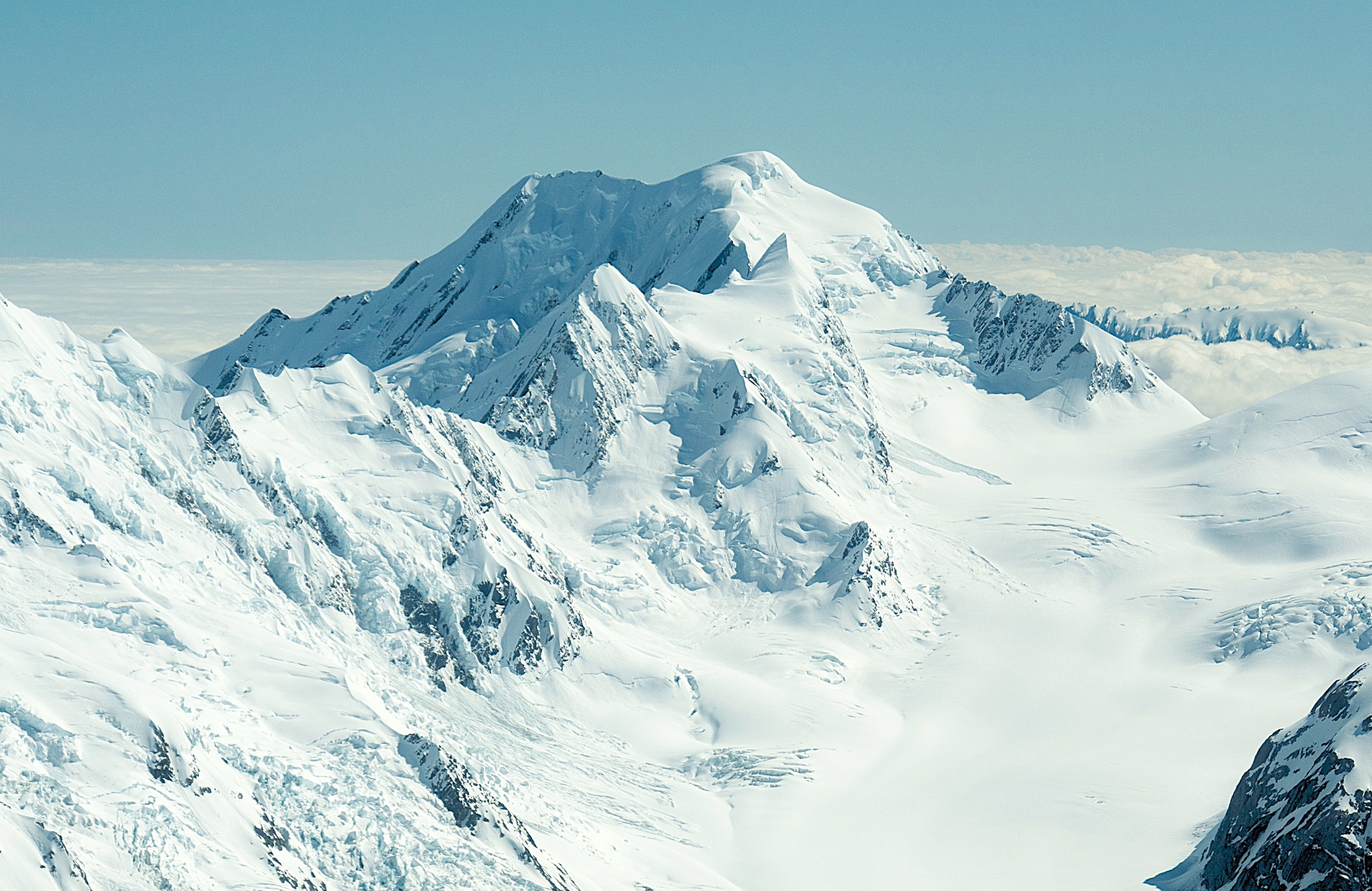
Mount Green, Mount Walter, and Mount Elie de Beaumont.
Aerial view from south.

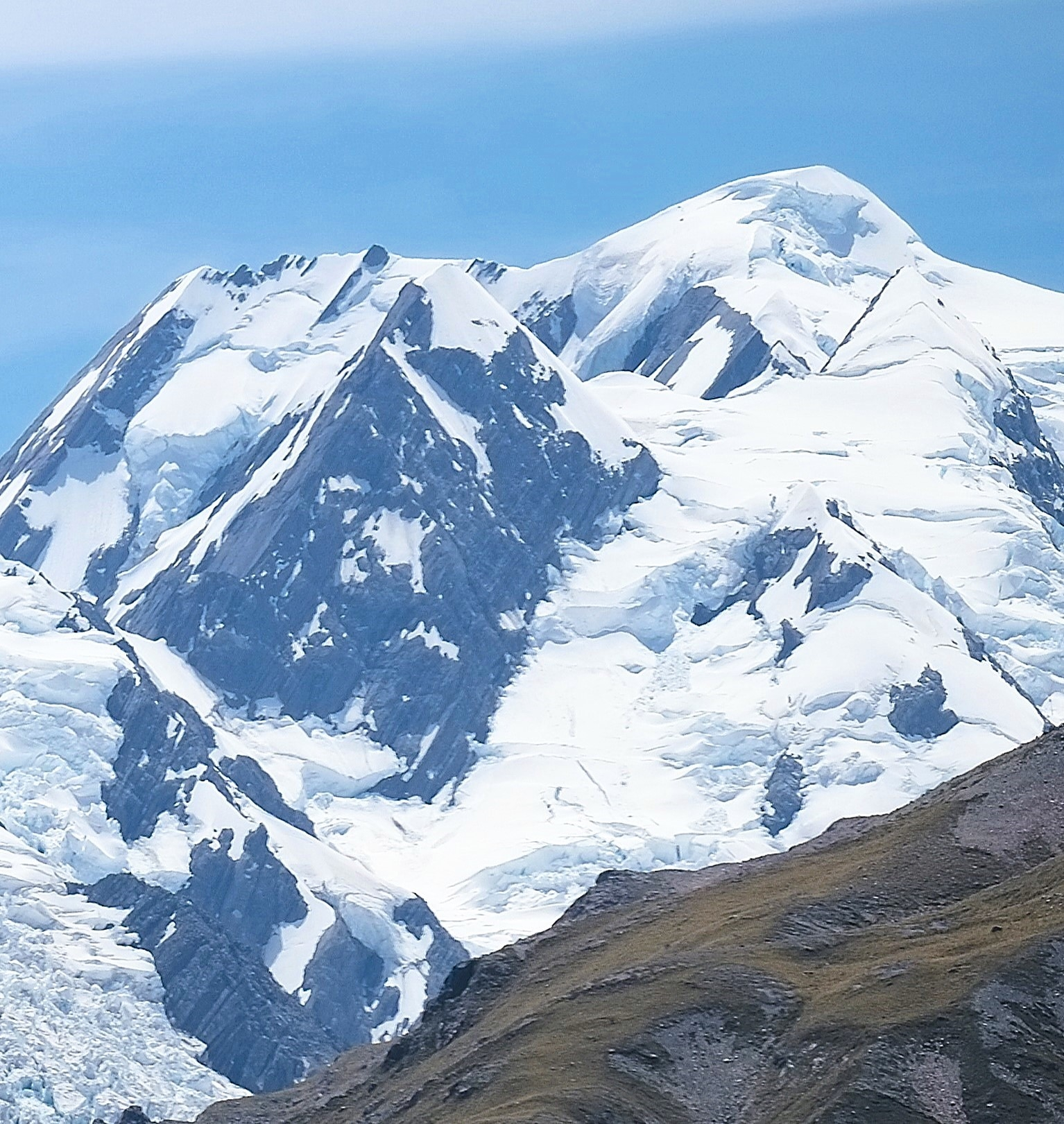
Mount Green (large area of dark rock to left), Mount Walter (right), and Mount Elie De Beaumont (in back)
