= Mount Swanzy =

Mountain in British Columbia, Canada

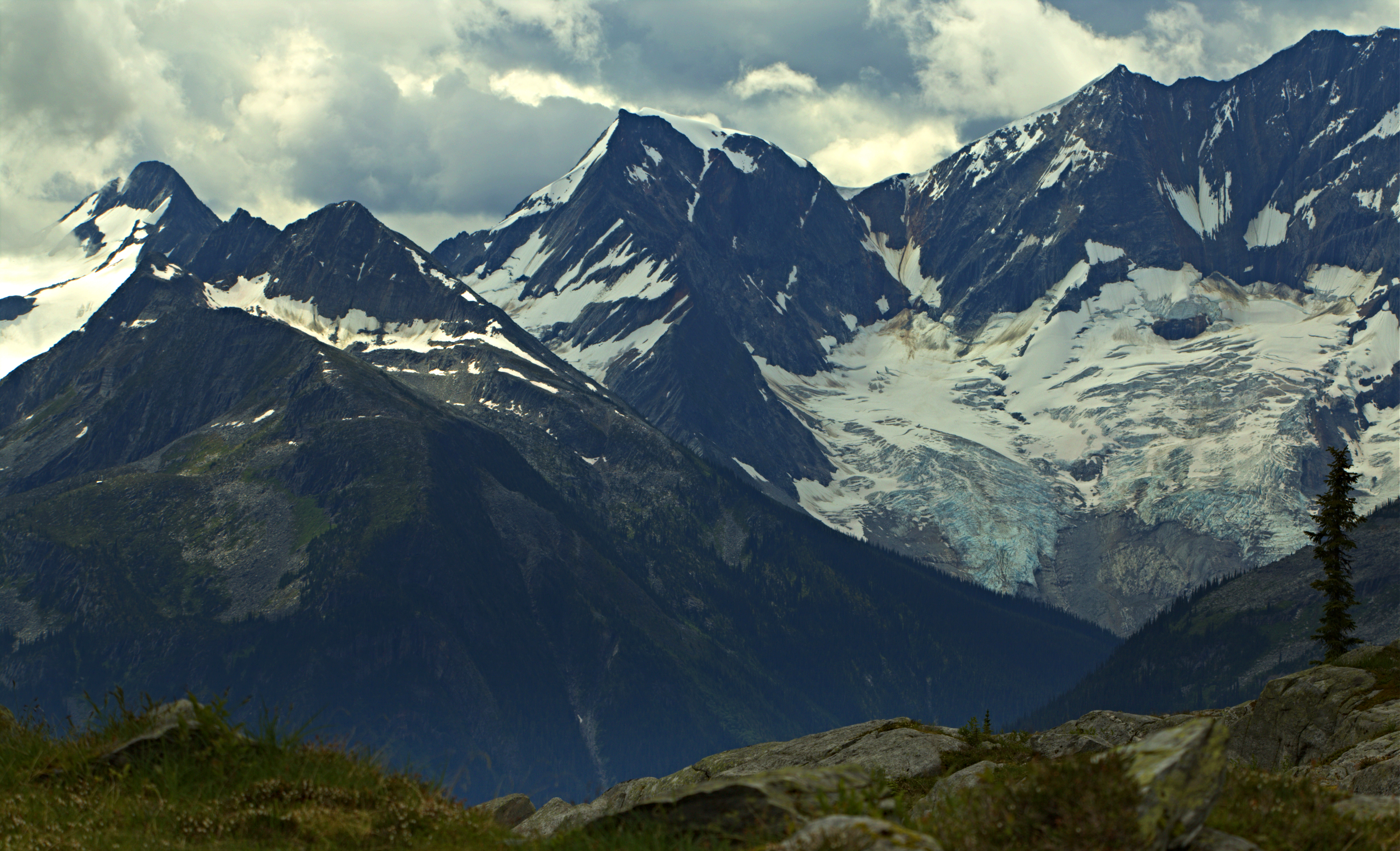
- Mount Swanzy (center) and Bonney Glacier

Highest point
- Elevation: 2,891 m (9,485 ft)
- Prominence: 146 m (479 ft)
- Parent peak: Mount Bonney (3100 m)
- Listing: Mountains of British Columbia
- Coordinates: 51°12′30″N 117°31′06″W

Geography
- Location within British Columbia Location within Canada
- Interactive map of Mount Swanzy
- Country: Canada
- Province: British Columbia
- District: Kootenay Land District
- Protected area: Glacier National Park
- Parent range: Duncan Ranges ← Selkirk Mountains
- Topo map: NTS 82N4 Illecillewaet

Climbing
- First ascent: 1900 Arthur Michael, Sydney Spencer, Edouard Feuz Sr, Friedrich Michel
- Easiest route: Scrambling YDS 3

Mount Swanzy is a 2,891-metre (9,485-foot) mountain summit located in Glacier National Park in the Selkirk Mountains of British Columbia, Canada. Mount Swanzy is surrounded by ice including the Bonney Glacier, Clarke Glacier, and Swanzy Glacier. Its nearest higher peak is Mount Bonney, 1.0 km (0.62 mi) to the west.

== History ==
The mountain was named in 1895 by Messrs. Abbot, Fay, and Thompson, for the Reverend Henry Swanzy, who with the Reverend William Spotswood Green introduced the world to the Selkirk Mountains following their 1888 first ascents of Mount Bonney and others.

The first ascent of the mountain was made in 1900 by Arthur Michael, Sydney Spencer, Edouard Feuz Sr, and Friedrich Michel.

The mountain's name was officially adopted in 1932 when approved by the Geographical Names Board of Canada.

== Climate ==
Based on the Köppen climate classification, Mount Swanzy is located in a subarctic climate zone with cold, snowy winters, and mild summers. Temperatures can drop below −20 °C with wind chill factors below −30 °C. Precipitation runoff from the mountain and meltwater from the surrounding glaciers drains north into the Illecillewaet River, or south into the Incomappleux River.

== Gallery ==
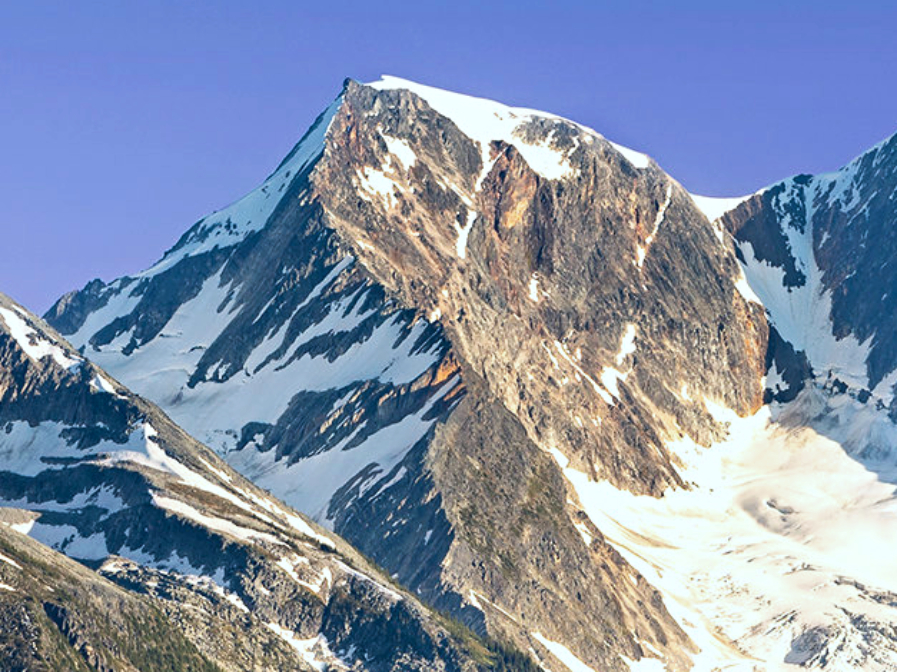
Mount Swanzy

== See also ==
- Geography of British Columbia
