= Swanzy =

Swanzy is a surname. It may refer to:

- Henry Swanzy (1915–2004), British radio producer
- Henry Rosborough Swanzy (1843–1913), Irish ophthalmic surgeon
- Mary Swanzy (1882–1978), Irish artist

== Other uses ==
- Mount Swanzy, a summit located in Glacier National Park in the Selkirk Mountains of British Columbia, Canada
- Swanzy, Michigan, an unincorporated community in Marquette County, Michigan, United States

== See also ==
- Swansea, Massachusetts, a town in Bristol County, Massachusetts, United States
- Swanzey, New Hampshire, a town in Cheshire County, New Hampshire, United States
