= Regurgitation =

Regurgitation or regurgitate may refer to:

- Regurgitation (circulation)
- Regurgitation (digestion)
- Regurgitate (band)

== See also ==
- Disgorge (disambiguation)
