= Mount Green =

Mountain summit in Canada

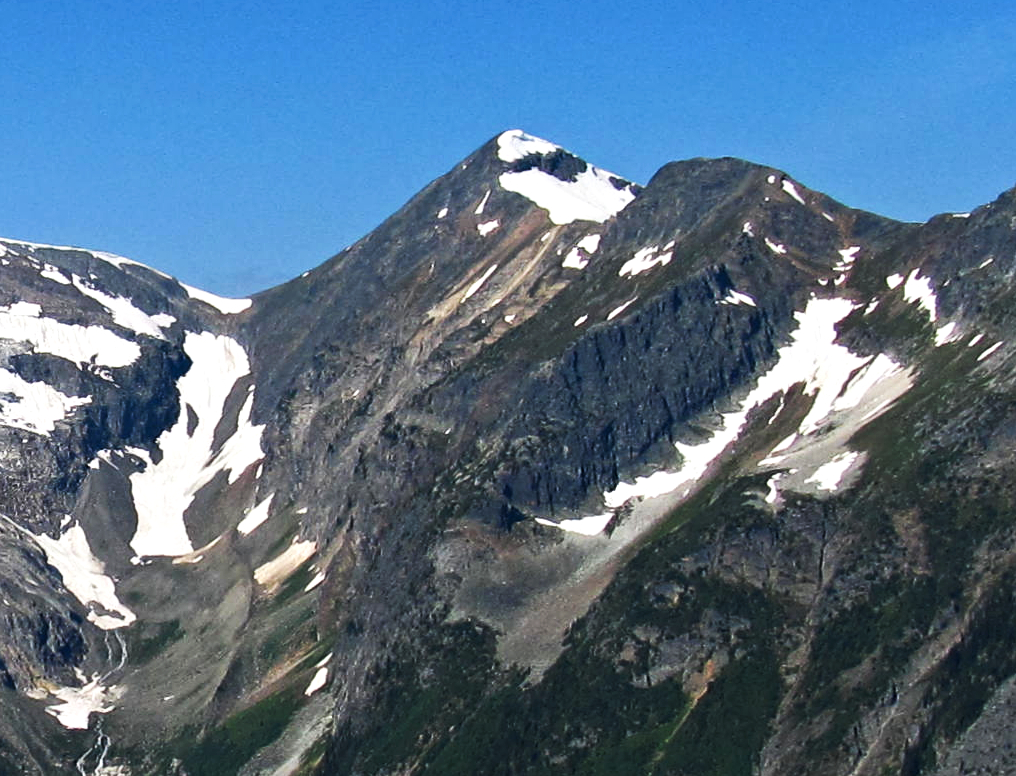
- Mount Green, east aspect

Highest point
- Elevation: 2,692 m (8,832 ft)
- Prominence: 218 m (715 ft)
- Parent peak: Mount Bonney (3100 m)
- Coordinates: 51°13′42″N 117°34′48″W

Geography
- Location within British Columbia Location within Canada
- Interactive map of Mount Green
- Country: Canada
- Province: British Columbia
- District: Kootenay Land District
- Protected area: Glacier National Park
- Parent range: Selkirk Mountains
- Topo map: NTS 82N4 Illecillewaet

Climbing
- First ascent: 1910, Alexander McCoubrey, Ernest Feuz
- Easiest route: YDS 3 Scrambling

Mount Green is a 2,692-metre (8,832-foot) mountain summit located in Glacier National Park, in the Selkirk Mountains of British Columbia, Canada. It is situated 4 km (2.5 mi) north-northwest of Mount Bonney, 10 km (6.2 mi) southwest of Rogers Pass, 52 km (32 mi) northeast of Revelstoke, and 44 km (27 mi) west of Golden. The mountain was named by Arthur Oliver Wheeler for Rev. William Spotswood Green (1847–1919), who explored, mapped, named, climbed, and wrote about the Selkirk Mountains. His book "Among the Selkirk Glaciers", published in 1890, introduced the world to the Selkirk Mountains. He is credited with recommending the location for a small chalet to the Canadian Pacific Railway that would grow to become the Chateau Lake Louise hotel, as well as making the first ascent of Mount Bonney. The mountain's name was officially adopted September 8, 1932, when approved by the Geographical Names Board of Canada. The first ascent of the mountain was made August 25, 1910, by Alexander A. McCoubrey and Ernest Feuz who climbed the south ridge and descended the north ridge.

== Climate ==
Based on the Köppen climate classification, Mount Green is located in a subarctic climate zone with cold, snowy winters, and mild summers. Temperatures can drop below −20 °C with wind chill factors below −30 °C. Precipitation runoff from the mountain drains north into the Illecillewaet River.

== See also ==
- List of mountains of Canada
- Geography of British Columbia
