= Spencer Walpole =

English historian and civil servant (1839–1907)

Sir Spencer Walpole KCB FBA
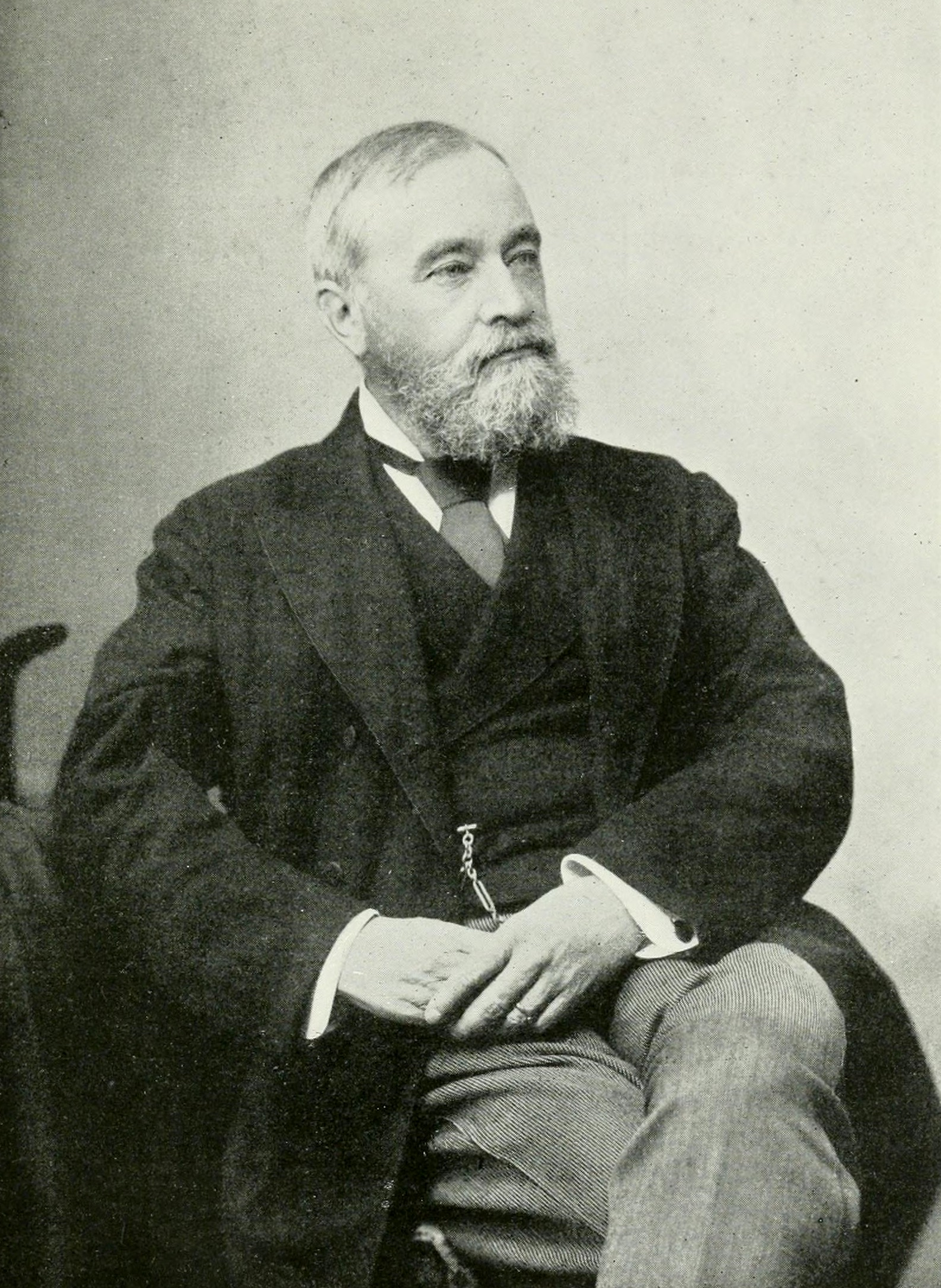

10th Lieutenant Governor of the Isle of Man
- In office 1882–1893
- Monarch: Victoria
- Preceded by: The Lord Loch
- Succeeded by: Sir West Ridgeway

Personal details
- Born: Spencer Walpole; 6 February 1839
- Died: 7 July 1907 (aged 68)
- Spouse: Marion Jane Murray
- Children: One son and one daughter

Sir Spencer Walpole KCB, FBA (6 February 1839 – 7 July 1907) was an English historian and civil servant.

== Background ==
He came of the younger branch of the de facto first prime minister, Robert Walpole who revived the Whig Party, being a patrilineal descendant of one of his brothers, the 1st Baron Walpole of Wolterton. His father Spencer Horatio Walpole (1807–1898) was three times Home Secretary under the 14th Earl of Derby. Through his mother he was a grandson of Spencer Perceval, the Tory prime minister. The only mainstream political parties in his lifetime which were at that time taking shape as the Liberal and Conservative parties were therefore closely connected to him at birth, and each party icon formed one half of his name.

== Career ==
Spencer Walpole was educated at Eton, and from 1858 to 1867 was a clerk in the War Office, then becoming an inspector of fisheries. In 1867 he married Marion Jane Murray; they had one son and one daughter. In 1882 he was made lieutenant-governor of the Isle of Man, and from 1893 to 1899 he was secretary to the Post Office. In 1898 he was knighted.

A most efficient public servant and in private life well-conversed, Walpole became a successfully published historian. His family connections gave him a natural affinity for the study of public affairs, and their mingling of Whig and Tory policies of past and present contributed to a deliberately reasoned, judicious and balanced view of English political figures – he inclined, however, to the Whig or moderate Liberal side, including in his writing. His principal work, A History of England from the Conclusion of the Great War in 1815 (1878–1886), in five volumes, was carried down to 1858, and was continued in his History of Twenty-Five Years (4 vol. 1904).

Among his other publications come his lives of Spencer Perceval (1894) and Lord John Russell (1889), and a volume of valuable Studies in Biography (1906).

His name is commemorated in Walpole Park in Ealing, formerly the grounds of his family home Pitzhanger Manor, both of which were purchased by Ealing Council in 1899.

== Bibliography ==
- Walpole, Spencer. A History of England from the Conclusion of the Great War in 1815 (5 vol., Longmans, Green, and Company, 1878–1886).
- Walpole, Spencer. History of Twenty-Five Years (4 vol.; 1904–1908) covers 1856–1880; online free; WorldCat holdings in 228 libraries worldwide.

Government offices
Preceded by Lord Loch	Lieutenant Governor of the Isle of Man; 1882–1893	Succeeded by Sir West Ridgeway
