= Disgorger =

Tool for removing fish hooks

Disgorger at the bottom, baiting needle at the top (mid-19th century)

A disgorger, also called an unhooker or hook remover, is a fishing tool for extracting a fish hook lodged too deeply in a fish's mouth to be reached easily with the fingers. It is used in coarse fishing and may be made of plastic or metal. Disgorgers are generally used for small fish; forceps and long-nose pliers are used for larger fish.

== Use ==
A disgorger is fitted around the fishing line and slid into the fish's mouth until its tip reaches the bend of the hook. Pushing the tool towards the fish releases the hook, which can then be withdrawn.

== Historical descriptions ==
The 1858 edition of Delabere Pritchett Blaine's An Encyclopaedia of Rural Sports described the disgorger as an implement used in both bottom fishing and fly fishing. Its forked tip released the hook by pressing against it. Blaine noted that a simple disgorger could be made from split cane, hard wood, or the handle of a horn or metal spoon, with a fork formed at one end. He also described his own steel version, which combined a fork at one end with a circular cutting blade at the other.

In Fishing: Pike and Other Coarse Fish (1903), Henry Cholmondeley-Pennell recommended disgorgers for pike fishing because of the risks posed by the fish's teeth and by the multiple hooks used in spin fishing. He illustrated the danger of unhooking a fish by hand with an account of a pike driving a hook into his finger while another hook remained attached to the fish. He also criticised ordinary disgorgers as too short and lacking a handle that provided a firm grip.
