= Land and Water =

British magazine

Land & Water
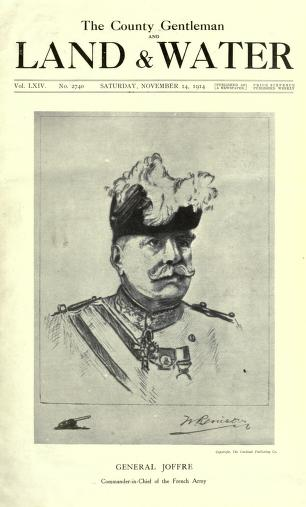
- The County Gentleman and Land & Water. Vol. 64, whole no. 27411. 14 November 1914.
- Native name: Sporting Gazette (1862–1878); Sporting Gazette and Agricultural Journal (1879); Country Gentleman, Sporting Gazette and Agricultural Journal (1880–1903); Country Gentleman (1903–1905); The Country Gentleman and Land & Water (1905–1915); Land & Water (1916–1920)
- Frequency: Weekly
- Founded: 1862
- Final issue: 1920
- Country: United Kingdom
- Language: English
- OCLC: 63924619

Land and Water was the title of a British magazine best known for its commentary on the First World War and its aftermath. The title was also used in earlier magazines about country sporting life. Tracing the title is challenging due to limited availability and miscataloguing of the magazines.

== Title history of Land and Water ==
Hon. Charles Brand (1855-1912), from The Country Gentleman, Sporting Gazette and Agricultural Journal, October 1881. Lithograph published by Vincent Brooks, Day & Son, Ltd.

The British Library's catalogue traces the magazine that became Land and Water back to 1862, with the founding of the "town and country newspaper" known as The Sporting Gazette. According to the British Library's tracing, the magazine continued in 1879 as The Sporting Gazette and Agricultural Journal, in 1880 as The County Gentleman, Sporting Gazette and Agricultural Journal, then in 1903 as The County Gentleman, in 1905 as The County Gentleman and Land and Water.

However, between 1866 and 1905 at least, Land and Water existed as a separate title – "Land and Water, The Landed Interest, Field Sports, & County Families Organ", and featured a mix of advertisements and articles ranging from London clubs to venues and dates for hare coursing. The Saturday 17 July 1897 issue was marked Vol LXIV No 1643. The issue dated Saturday 9 February 1901 was Vol LXXXI no 1,829, and bore the same header although by then it was printed in blue ink rather than black.

The earliest mention of a Land and Water magazine in the British Library catalogue is for "a journal of field sport, sea, river fisheries and practical natural history, incorporated with The Country Gentleman", beginning in 1866. (A "nature magazine" of the same name was started by Irish fishery reformer William Joshua Ffennell in that same year.) It is unclear whether "Country Gentleman" in the catalogue indicates a typographical error or a separate publication; there were other magazines that used that title, including the London-based Country Gentleman's Magazine, and the American Country Gentleman, a popular magazine of the time. While many reference sources today continue to confuse "Country Gentleman" and "County Gentleman", page scans from the start of World War I clearly show the title The County Gentleman and Land & Water.

Another wholly unrelated magazine sharing the same title was published by Amy Dencklau from 1974 to 2017 in Fort Dodge, Iowa.

== Land and Water: The World's War ==
In 1914, the magazine's coverage shifted to World War I. The change was initiated by James Murray "Jim" Allison, then advertisement manager of The Times. Until 1916, the magazine would continue to be published as County Gentleman and Land & Water, but issues from the start of the war onward were later bound in volumes titled Land and Water, subtitled "The World's War". Issues of the magazine from 1916 onward were simply titled Land and Water.

The World War I Land and Water was edited by the well-known Catholic writer Hilaire Belloc. Editing it was the only steady employment ever held by Belloc, who otherwise "lived by his pen". Belloc made numerous trips to the Western Front on behalf of the paper, and also collected information from well-placed friends in the ranks of the Army. The journal gained quick popularity and within a short time of being launched its circulation passed the hundred thousand mark.

Belloc, always a forthright and bellicose writer, excelled in warlike editorials and stirring articles. He had always had considerable dislike for the Germans, going back to his French antecedents and to having served in the French Army at the time when French bitterness over the loss of Alsace-Lorraine was at its peak. During the war, this was very much in tune with prevailing British attitudes. In various articles Belloc characterised the war being fought as a duel between "Pagan Barbarism" and "Christian Civilization", stating that the nominally Christian German Empire was ruled by “Prussianism”, which he later characterised as “an anti-Christian attitude which takes the form of an Army”. He expressed regret that numerous fellow-Catholics were fighting on the opposite side, especially from thoroughly Catholic Austria, stating his belief that Austria’s local troubles had been used by the Germans as a springboard to launch a World War.

The journal was charged with highly inflated estimates of enemy casualties, and Belloc's over-optimistic estimates of when the war would end with an Allied victory were several times proved premature – which did not harm its popularity. On one occasion during the war Belloc is known to have confidentially told G. K. Chesterton, his longtime friend and collaborator, that "it is sometimes necessary to lie damnably in the interests of the nation".

During the war the magazine also employed Arthur Pollen as writer on naval issues.

After the end of the war, the journal continued covering world events, such as the Treaty of Versailles and the Russian Civil War, where Belloc strongly supported an intervention to crush the Bolsheviks. However, in 1920 it ceased publication, and was absorbed by The Field, thus returning to its sporting roots. The Field is still published today.
