= William Joshua Ffennell =

Irish fishery reformer

- Born: 16 August 1799; Ballybrado, County Tipperary, Kingdom of Ireland
- Died: 12 March 1867 (aged 67); London, United Kingdom
- Organization: Suir Preservation Society
- Known for: Fishery reform
- Spouse: Margaret Catherine Prendergast (m. 1830)
- Children: 9

William Joshua Ffennell (1799–1867), was an Irish fishery reformer.

Ffennell was the eldest son and second of sixteen children of Joshua William and Elizabeth Ffennell, was born 16 August 1799, at Ballybrado, three miles below Cahir on the River Suir. The family had been members of the Society of Friends almost from the time of George Fox, but Ffennell's father, a hospitable country gentleman, was excluded from the society on account of undue conformity to the world. William Joshua resented this sentence (which was afterwards reversed), and with his five brothers joined the established church. He had a desultory education, and spent much time in hunting, shooting, and fishing. He became especially expert in angling for salmon; and his attention was drawn to the decay of the fishing in the Suir and other rivers.

== Career ==
In 1824 Ffennell took a lease of Carrigataha, which adjoins Ballybrado on the Suir. After carefully studying the habits of the fish and making himself acquainted with the old acts of parliament, he endeavoured to rouse public attention, with a view to legislative reform. He had difficulties with the poachers in the upper waters, and with the proprietors of the "stake weirs" in the tideway. An act passed in 1826 had forbidden the constabulary to interfere for the protection of salmon. In 1834 he was appointed to the commission of the peace, and by firmness and tact obtained the full confidence of the people in spite of his tory politics. He thus managed to improve the state of the Suir and to obtain the support of public opinion. In 1837 a petition upon the Irish fisheries was presented to parliament by the Earl of Glengall, a friend and neighbour of Ffennell, who spoke upon the subject in the House of Lords (19 June). Lord Glengall and Ffennell became chairman and secretary of the Suir Preservation Society, founded in the same year. It was due to their exertions that an act was passed in 1842, embodying many of Ffennell's proposals, but unfortunately giving privileges to the stake weirs, which long hindered the development of the fishery.

In 1844 an act was passed authorising police protection for the rivers; and in 1845 another salmon act was passed, and Ffennell was appointed fishery inspector under the board of works. His office included the inspection of sea fisheries, and during the Great Famine he visited Scotland, examined the process of fish-curing, and tried to introduce it among the starving population of the west coast of Ireland. In 1848 the act commonly called "Ffennell's Act" was passed. This is the initial act of modern salmon legislation, which provides funds and machinery for carrying the law into practice, by making the local administration of the salmon acts self-supporting. He now became a commissioner at the Office of Public Works for the superintendence of the newly formed fishery districts. In 1853 he exhibited working models of salmon passes at the Dublin exhibition of that year, which attracted general attention. His advice was frequently sought in England and Scotland; and in 1860 he was appointed one of the royal commissioners to examine the salmon fisheries of England and Wales. Their report led to an act passed in 1861, under which Ffennell was appointed inspector of salmon fisheries for England and Wales. In 1862 he was appointed commissioner of fisheries for Scotland.

Ffennell started a nature magazine, Land and Water, in 1866.

=== Salmon Act ===
In 1863 a salmon act for Ireland was passed, which at last got rid of the stake weirs. A pamphlet written by him contributed to securing this measure. A similar act was passed for England in 1865. In 1866 he started Land and Water, in conjunction with his friend Francis T. Buckland, with a special eye to the fisheries.

== Personal life and death ==
Ffennell married Margaret Catherine (née Prendergast) in 1830. He had nine children.

He died in London 12 March 1867. His chief power lay in his practical knowledge of the salmon fishery question in its minutest details, and his singularly clear and effective method of bringing forward the subject at public meetings.
