= William Spotswood Green =

Irish naturalist (1847–1919)

William Spotswood Green CB (10 September 1847 – 22 April 1919) was an Irish naturalist, who specialised in marine biology.

Born at Youghal and educated at Trinity College Dublin, he was ordained a priest in 1873. He had already worked on marine biology before he left the services of the Church in 1890: in the 1880s, he participated as a leading member in several research expeditions sponsored by the Royal Irish Academy. In 1892, he became the Inspector of Fisheries. Combined with this work he was a Commissioner on the Congested Districts Board, where his intimate knowledge of human conditions in western Ireland was of great service. In 1914 he shook off the trammels of office, and retired to Westcove House, Caherdaniel, County Kerry. There he died five years later.

Green was also a member of the Alpine Club and became a mountain climber well-known especially in Canada and New Zealand. In 1882, he attempted with two Swiss guides a first ascent of Mount Cook in New Zealand, but the party was forced back by bad weather shortly before they reached the top. At a dinner in their honour he proposed the "founding of a New Zealand Alpine Club", which eventually occurred in 1891. In the late 1880s Green did survey work in the Rocky Mountains of British Columbia, including the first ascent of Mount Bonney in 1888. Mount Green in Glacier National Park of the Selkirk Mountains is named in his honour, as well as Mount Green in New Zealand.

He was appointed a Companion of the Order of the Bath (CB) in the 1907 Birthday Honours.

== Selected publications ==
- Green, W. S.: The High Alps of New Zealand. Or a Trip to the Glaciers of the Antipodes With an Ascent of Mount Cook. Macmillan & Co., London 1883.
- Green, W. S.: Among the Selkirk glaciers: being the account of a rough survey in the Rocky Mountain regions of British Columbia, Macmillan & Co., London 1890.
- Green, W. S. (May 1906). "The Wrecks of the Spanish Armada on the Coast of Ireland". The Geographical Journal. 27 (5): 429–451.
