= Henry Cholmondeley-Pennell =

English poet and writer on angling (1837–1915)

Henry Cholmondeley-Pennell

Henry Cholmondeley-Pennell (1837–1915) was an English poet, civil servant and writer on angling.

== Career ==
Cholmondeley-Pennell served in several departments of the Admiralty before being selected to carry out commercial reforms for the Khedive of Egypt. He edited and contributed articles to the Fisherman's Magazine and Review in 1864–1865. Pennell was an inspector of fisheries between 1866 and 1875.

== Writings ==
His poetry publications included Puck on Pegasus, The Crescent and From Grave to Gay. He also edited The Muses of Mayfair (1874), an anthology of nineteenth-century vers de société.

His books on angling and ichthyology included The Angler-Naturalist: A Popular History of British Fresh-Water Fish (1863) and The Modern Practical Angler: A Complete Guide to Fly-Fishing, Bottom-Fishing & Trolling (1870). He also wrote two volumes on fishing for the Badminton Library.

== Fly design ==
Cholmondeley-Pennell designed three wingless trout flies, in green, brown and yellow. In The Modern Practical Angler, he argued that these were sufficient for trout fishing in Britain and elsewhere. According to the angling writer Sylvester Nemes, these designs brought him fame.

He chose the three colours because he considered them predominant among mayflies and caddisflies. He rejected artificial wings on the grounds that feathers and other available materials could not reproduce the insects' transparent wings. He retained tail fibres, arguing that they resembled the natural insects' tails, concealed the hook and helped prevent the fly from swimming tail-down.

Nemes calls the proposal "revolutionary" and says it drew a good deal of attention and argument in the angling press. He quotes a piece in the Fishing Gazette of 19 February 1881 whose author thought the theory was well known among anglers but doubted it had won many over. The writer suggested that using only the three patterns would make fly fishing simpler, but would also put professional fly dressers out of work.
