= Baiting needle =

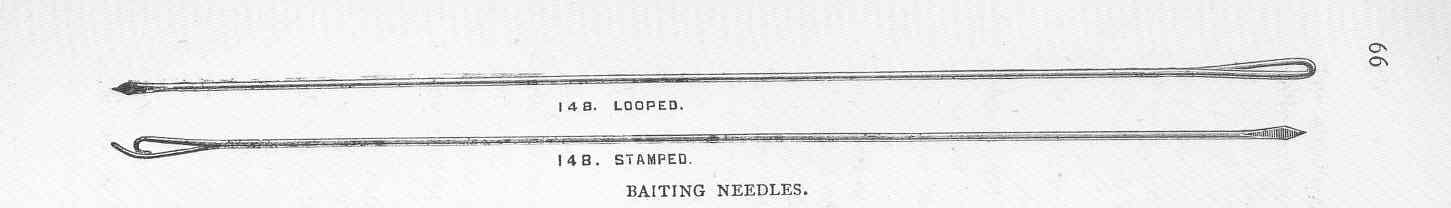

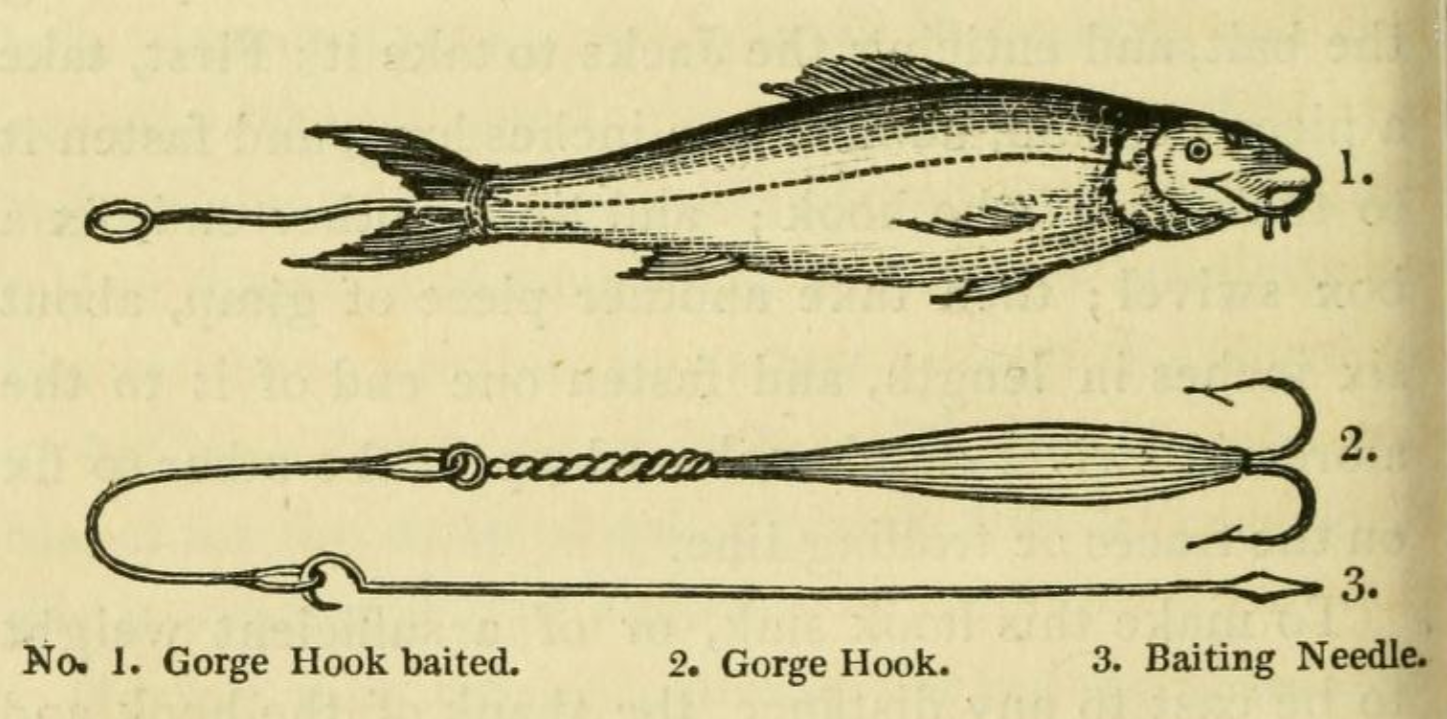
Baiting using the needle: at the bottom, a gorge hook is attached to the baiting needle, at the top, fully baited hook after the needle is detached

A baiting needle is a tool used in angling to thread the bait onto the hook. It is shaped as a long steel needle with a sharp point on one end and a loop on another.

Baiting needles are made in different sizes to match the size of the bait, named after small fish sizes, like "minnow needle" for fathead minnow that is frequently used as a bait.

== Sources ==
- Niven, Richard (1892). "Baiting Needle". The British Angler's Lexicon. W. J. Cummins. p. 39.
- Salter, Thomas Frederick (1833). The Angler's Guide: Being a Plain and Complete Practical Treatise on the Art of Angling for Sea, River, and Pond Fish ... John Wicksteed.
