= Mount Bonney =

Mountain summit in British Columbia, Canada

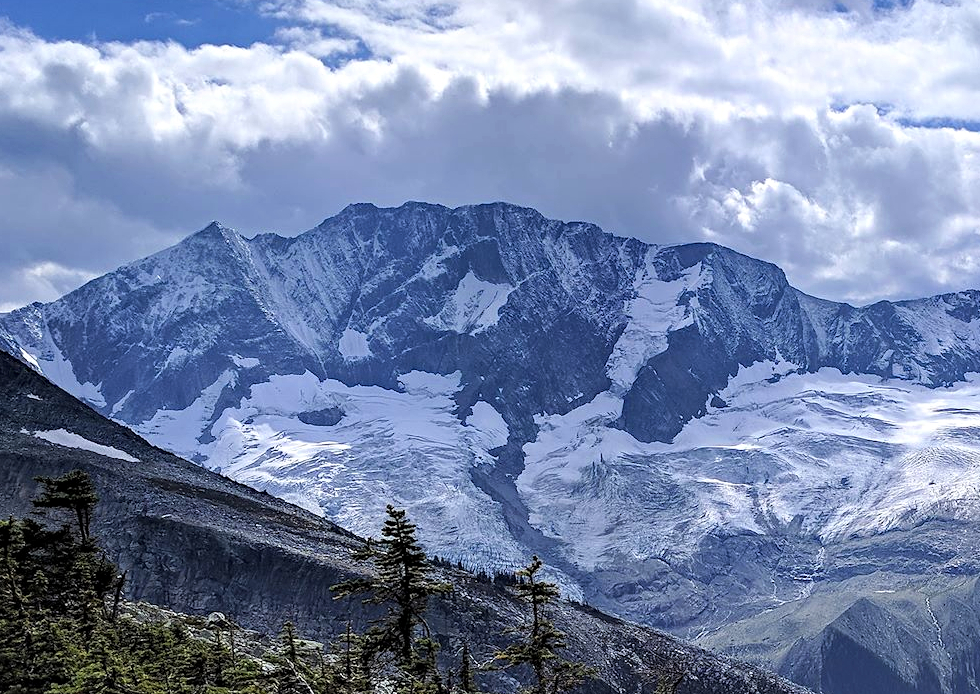
- Mount Bonney featuring Bonney Glacier

Highest point
- Elevation: 3,100 m (10,200 ft)
- Prominence: 750 m (2,460 ft)
- Parent peak: Mount Sir Donald (3284 m)
- Listing: Mountains of British Columbia
- Coordinates: 51°12′17″N 117°32′28″W

Geography
- Location within British Columbia Location within Canada
- Interactive map of Mount Bonney
- Location: Glacier National Park; British Columbia, Canada
- District: Kootenay Land District
- Parent range: Duncan Ranges → Selkirk Mountains
- Topo map: NTS 82N4 Illecillewaet

Climbing
- First ascent: 1888 William S. Green, Henry Swanzy
- Easiest route: Scrambling YDS 3

Mount Bonney, is a 3,100-metre (10,200-foot) mountain summit located in Glacier National Park in the Selkirk Mountains of British Columbia, Canada. Mount Bonney is surrounded by ice including the Bonney Glacier, Clarke Glacier, Swanzy Glacier, and Bonney Névé. Its nearest higher peak is Mount Sir Donald, 10.0 km (6.2 mi) to the northeast. Mount Bonney is visible from Highway 1, the Trans-Canada Highway at Rogers Pass.

== History ==
The first ascent of the mountain was made in 1888 by Reverend William S. Green and Rev. Henry Swanzy. The first ascent by a lady was in 1904 by Henrietta L. Tuzo with guide Christian Bohren.

Mount Bonney, Bonney Glacier, and Bonney Névé were each named in 1888 by Reverend Green for Thomas George Bonney (1833–1923), president of the Geological Society of London and president of the Alpine Club of London.

The mountain's name was officially adopted in 1932 when approved by the Geographical Names Board of Canada.

== Climate ==
Based on the Köppen climate classification, Mount Bonney has a subarctic climate with cold, snowy winters, and mild summers. Winter temperatures can drop below −20 °C with wind chill factors below −30 °C. Precipitation runoff from the mountain drains north into the Illecillewaet River, or south into the Incomappleux River.

== Gallery ==
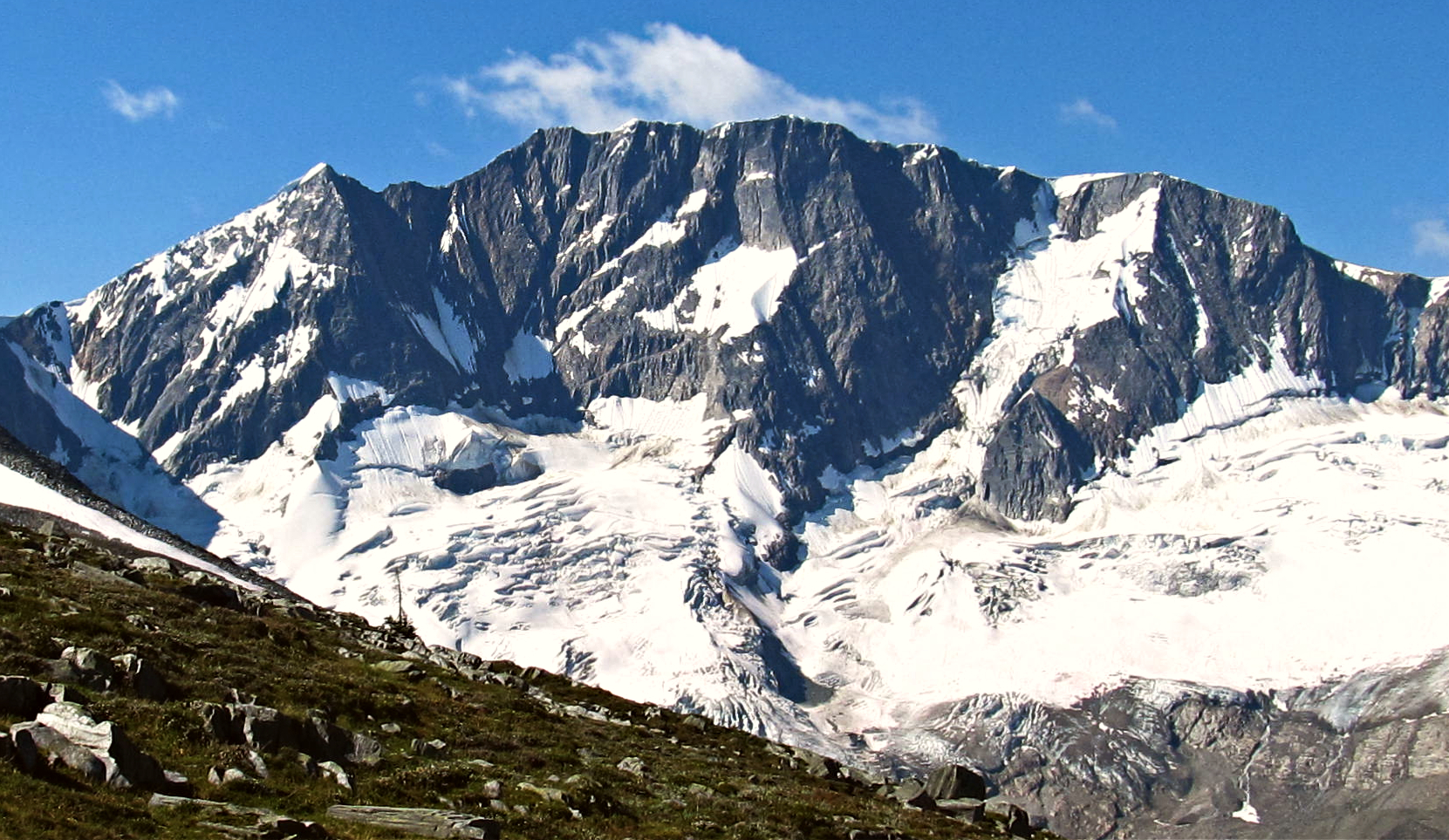
Mount Bonney

== See also ==
- Geography of British Columbia
