= Mount Ogden (British Columbia) =

Mountain in Canada

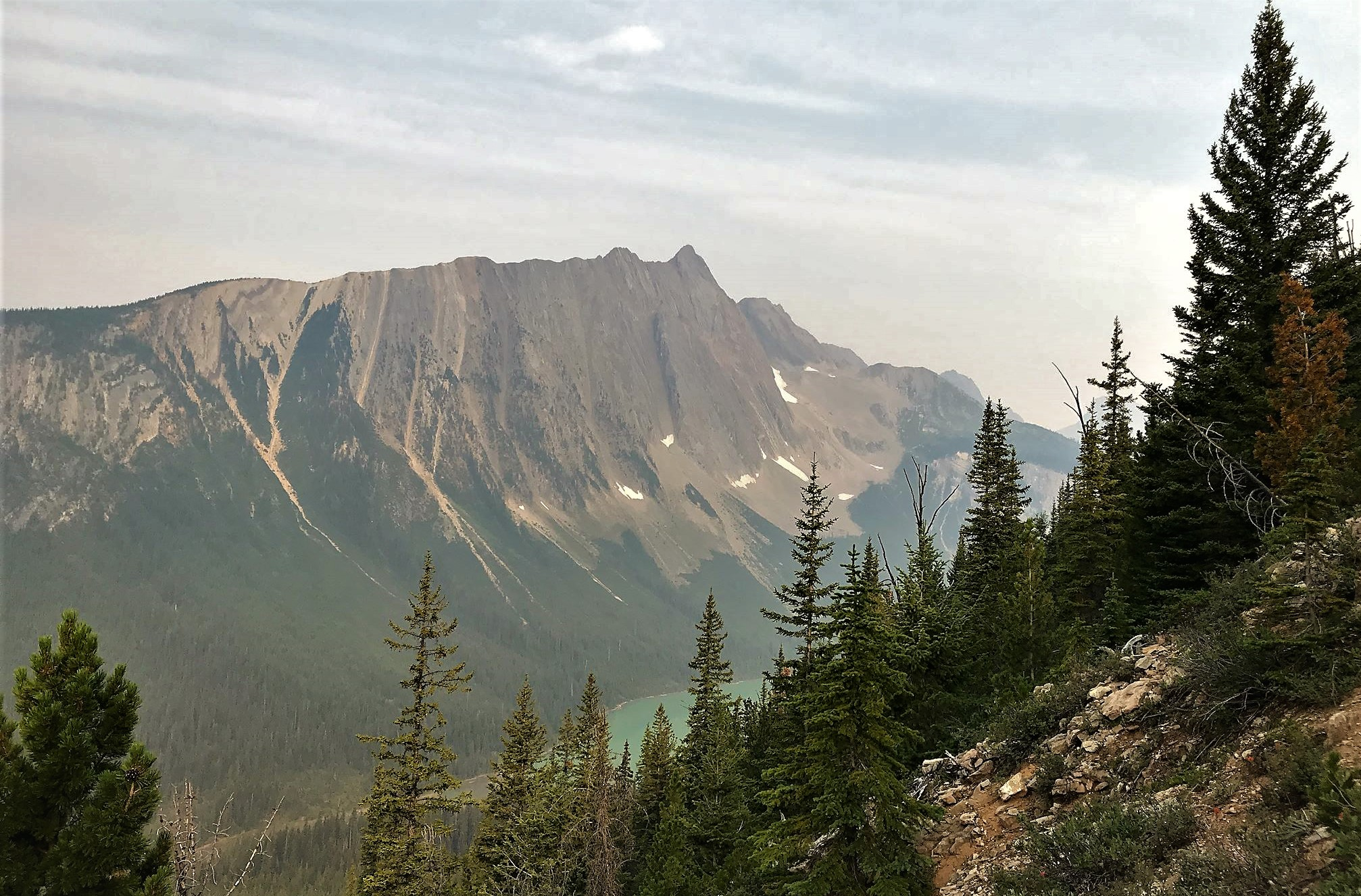
- Southeast aspect, from Paget Peak Trail

Highest point
- Elevation: 2,702 m (8,865 ft)
- Prominence: 122 m (400 ft)
- Parent peak: Mount Niles (2,967 m)
- Isolation: 3.27 km (2.03 mi)
- Listing: Mountains of British Columbia
- Coordinates: 51°27′43″N 116°24′33″W

Naming
- Etymology: Isaac Gouverneur Ogden

Geography
- Location within British Columbia Location within Canada
- Interactive map of Mount Ogden
- Location: Yoho National Park; British Columbia, Canada
- District: Kootenay Land District
- Parent range: Waputik Range; Canadian Rockies
- Topo map: NTS 82N8 Lake Louise

Geology
- Rock age: Cambrian
- Rock type(s): sedimentary rock, limestone

Climbing
- Easiest route: Scrambling via South ridge

Mount Ogden is a mountain in the Canadian Rockies of British Columbia, Canada.

== Description ==
Mount Ogden is a 2,702-metre (8,865-foot) summit located in Yoho National Park. The peak is situated 3.5 km west of the Continental Divide in the Waputik Range. Takakkaw Falls is six km to the northwest, and Sherbrooke Lake lies immediately below the southeast slope. Precipitation runoff from Mount Ogden drains west into the Yoho River and east into Sherbrooke Creek, which are both tributaries of the Kicking Horse River. Topographic relief is significant as the summit rises over 1,300 meters (4,265 feet) above Yoho Valley in two kilometers (1.2 mile). Mt. Ogden is visible from the Trans-Canada Highway (Highway 1) which traverses the southern base of the mountain. The nearest higher peak is Mount Niles, 4.86 km (3.02 mi) to the north.

== History ==
The name "Ogden Mountain" was adopted June 30, 1904, and the toponym was changed to "Mount Ogden" June 30, 1911. The mountain is named after Isaac Gouverneur Ogden (born October 10, 1844), vice president of the Canadian Pacific Railway. The mountain's toponym was officially adopted in 1924 by the Geographical Names Board of Canada.

Owing to frequent accidents and expensive helper engines associated with railroading at Kicking Horse Pass, in 1909 the Canadian Pacific Railway built the Spiral Tunnels, one of which loops 887 metres (2,910 ft) within the interior of Mt. Ogden. A railway employee once played a small piano loaded onto a handcar as it coasted through this tunnel.

== Geology ==
Mount Ogden is composed of sedimentary rock laid down during the Precambrian to Jurassic periods. Formed in shallow seas, this sedimentary rock was pushed east and over the top of younger rock during the Laramide orogeny.

== Climate ==
Based on the Köppen climate classification, Mount Ogden is located in a subarctic climate zone with cold, snowy winters, and mild summers. Winter temperatures can drop below −20 °C with wind chill factors below −30 °C. This climate supports several ice climbing routes on the peak's west slope.

== Gallery ==
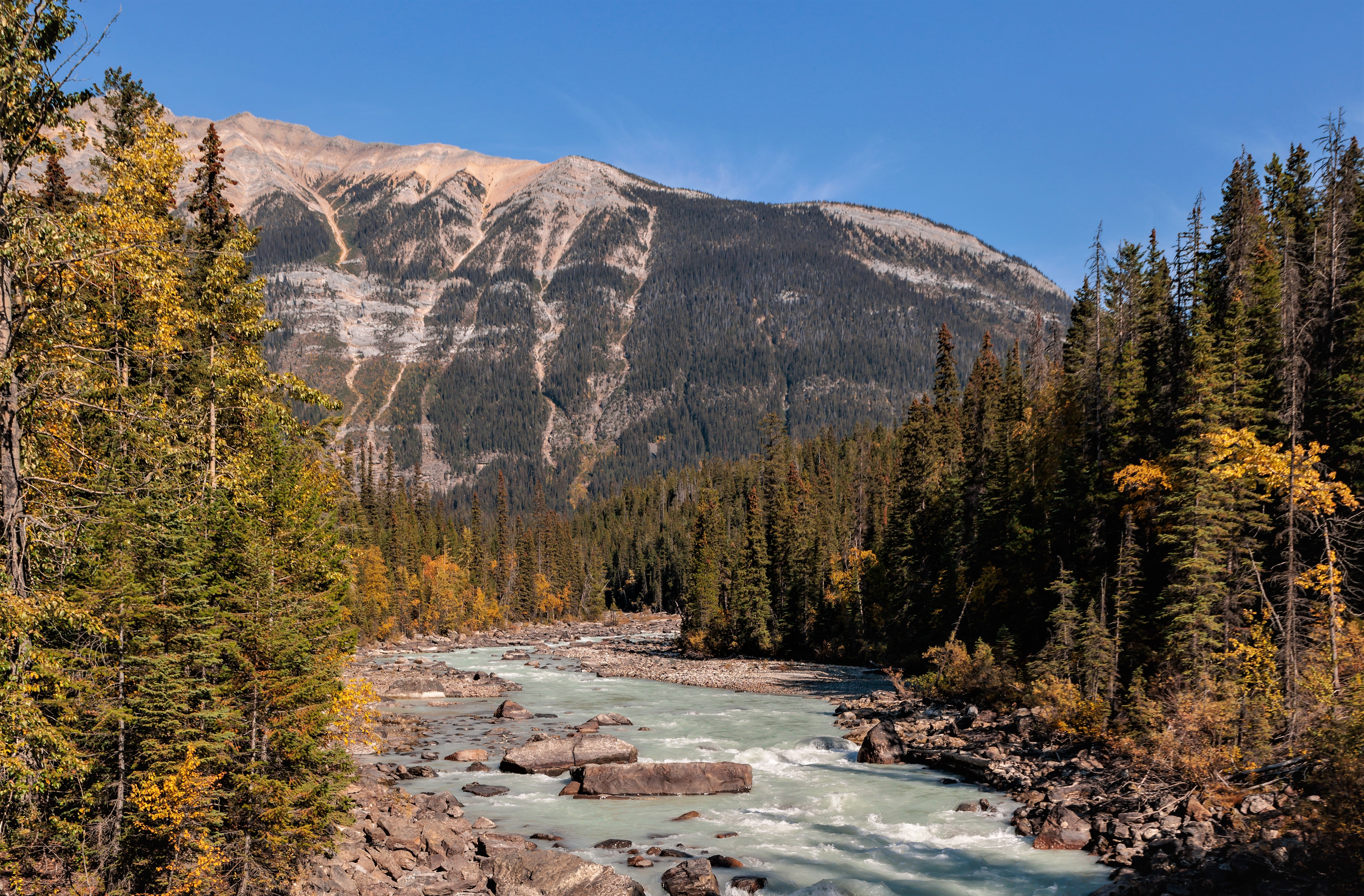
Ogden's South ridge and Kicking Horse River

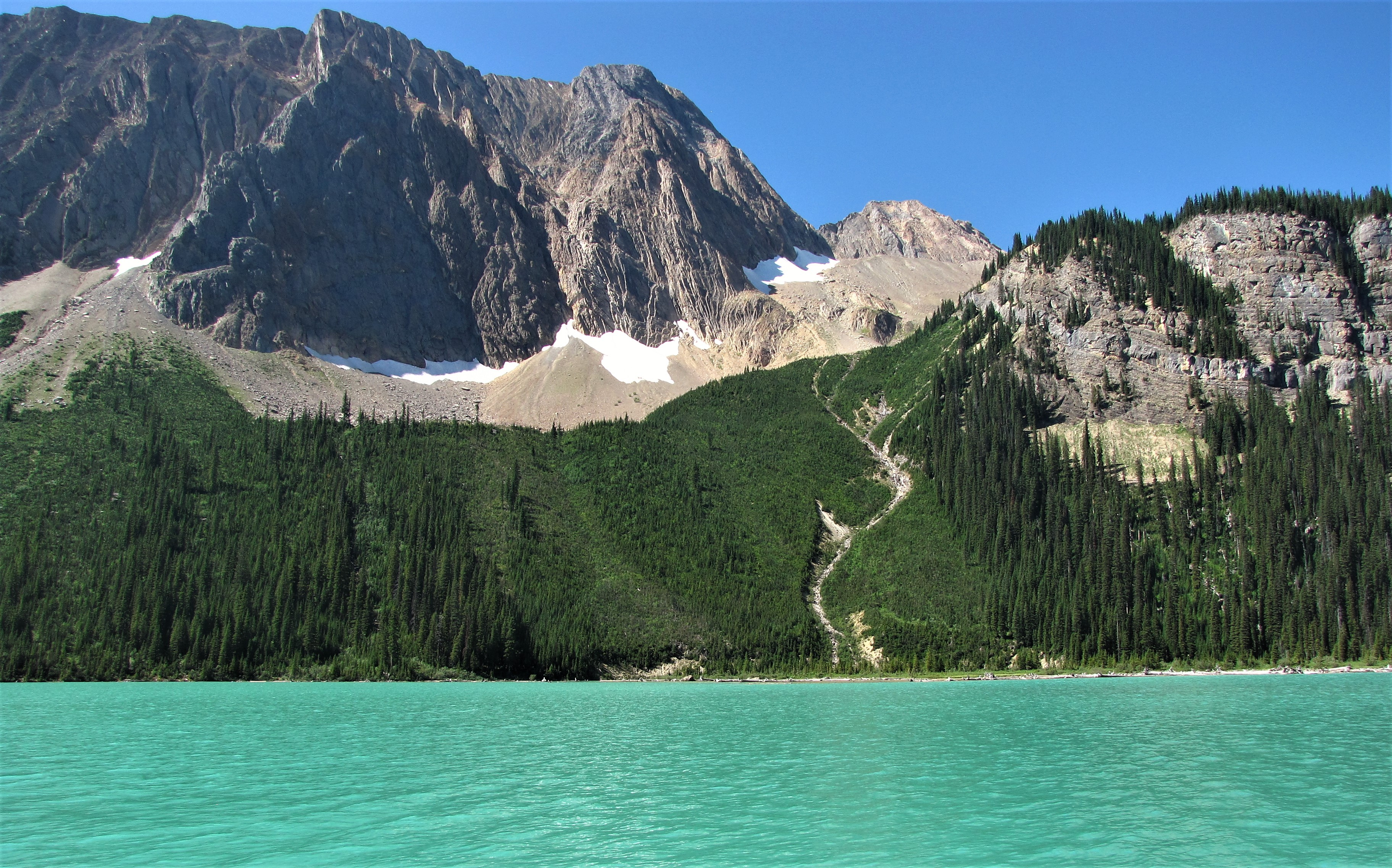
Mount Ogden from Sherbrooke Lake

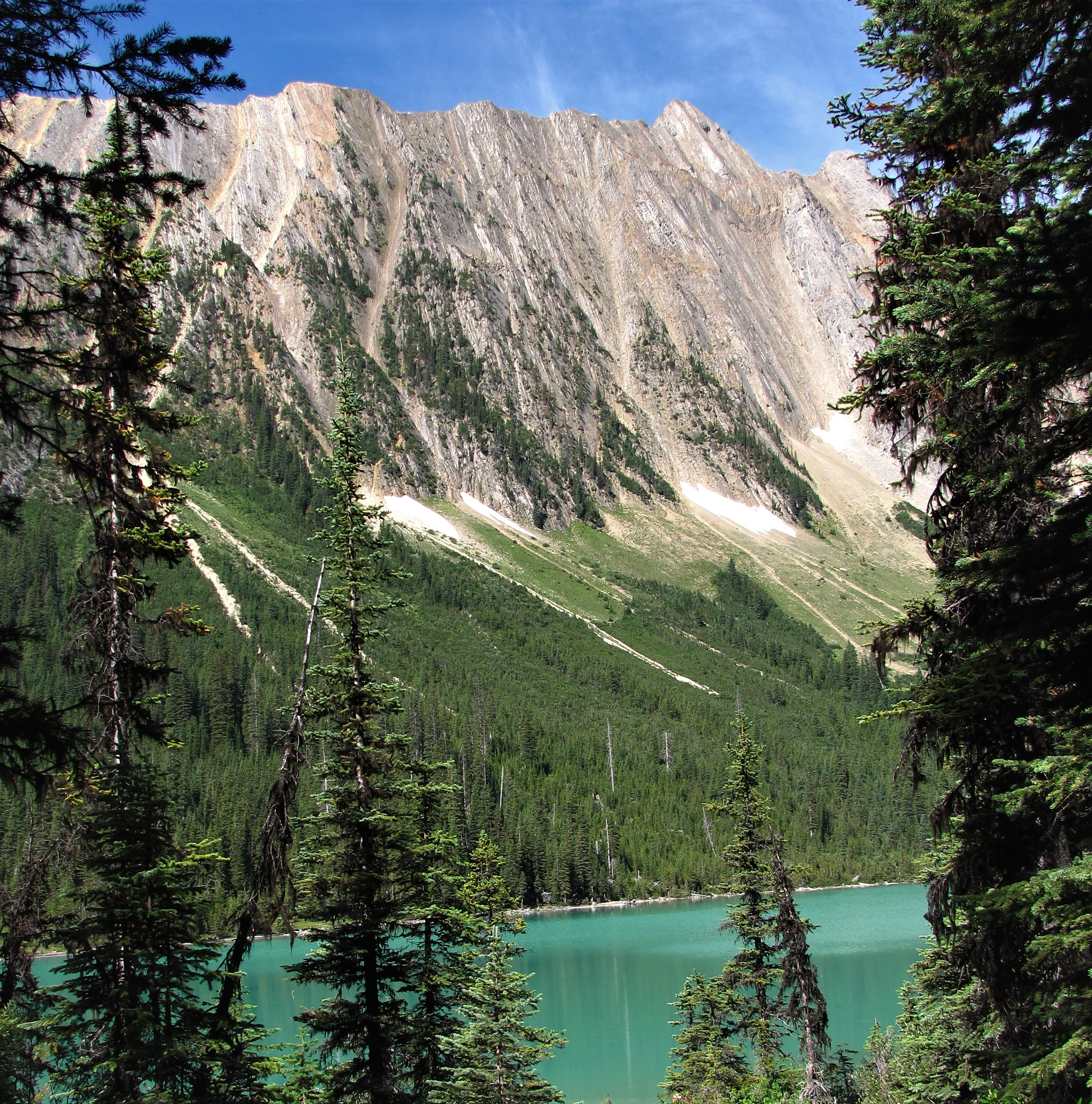
Mount Ogden and Sherbrooke Lake. The summit is far right along edge of tree.

== See also ==
- Geography of British Columbia
