= Paget Peak =

Mountain in Yoho NP, British Columbia, Canada

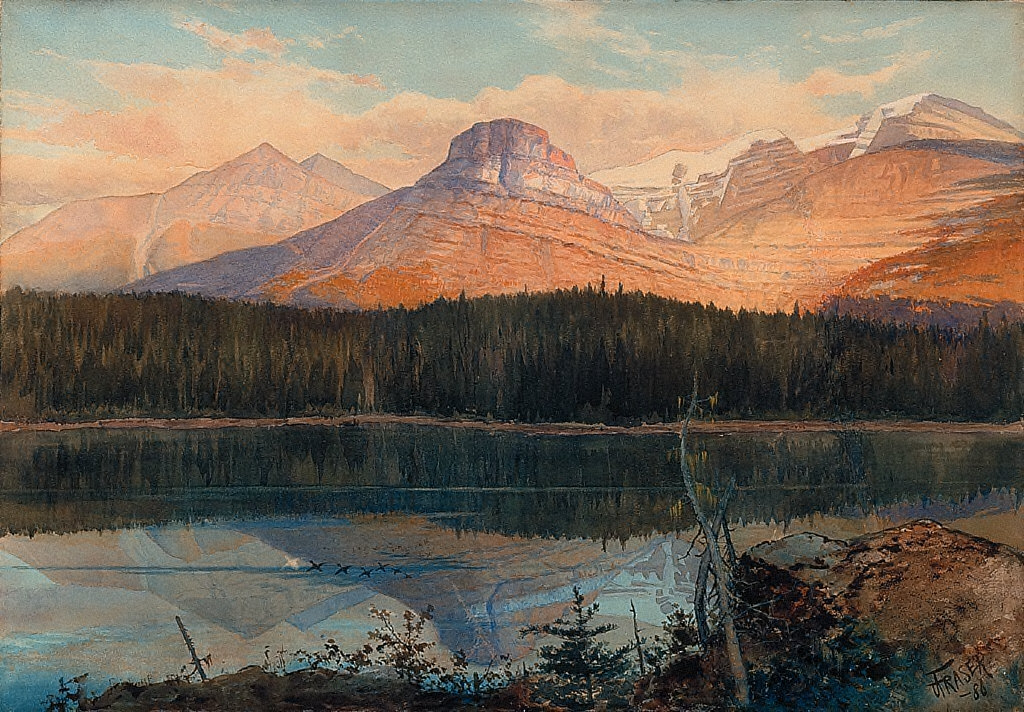
- Summit Lake near Lenchoile, Bow River, Canadian Pacific Railway, by John Arthur Fraser. Possibly Paget Peak and Sherbrooke Lake in British Columbia

Highest point
- Elevation: 2,560 m (8,400 ft)
- Coordinates: 51.46110°N 116.3639°W

Geography
- Location within British Columbia
- Interactive map of Paget Peak
- Location: Yoho National Park, British Columbia, Canada
- District: Kootenay Land District
- Topo map: NTS 82N8 Lake Louise

Climbing
- First ascent: Dean Paget

Paget Peak is a mountain in Yoho National Park, British Columbia, Canada. It is readily accessible via a hiking trail.

== Description ==
Paget Peak has an elevation of 2,560 metres (8,400 ft). It is in Yoho National Park, British Columbia, at the southern end of the Mount Daly Range, beside Mount Bosworth. It is just south of the Continental Divide of the Americas and 2 kilometres (1.2 mi) north of Wapta Lake. It overlooks this lake and Sherbrooke Lake. It is named after Dean Paget, the first to record ascending the peak, one of the founders of the Alpine Club of Canada (ACC). He reached the summit with a group of ACC members. The surveyor James J. McArthur ascended the peak in 1886. The peak gives its name to Paget limestone, found at a type location on the southeast slope of the peak.

== Access ==
The mountain may be accessed from the parking lot on the north side of the Trans-Canada Highway opposite Wapta Lake, just west of the Alberta border. Access is via the Sherbrooke Lake trail for 1.8 kilometres (1.1 mi) and then the Paget Lookout trail. This is a hiking trail that leads to a disused fire lookout on the southern slope, one of the first to be built in the park. The lookout was built after two seasons of serious forest fires in the late 1930s and early 1940s, and was used until the late 1970s. The round trip is 11.3 kilometres (7.0 mi) with an elevation gain of 985 metres (3,232 ft) and is rated moderate. The trail is best used from June to September. The peak may be reached by a scramble from the lookout.

== Sources ==
- "James Joseph McArthur", Summit Search
- Maps: Yoho National Park, Parks Canada
- Paget Peak, AllTrails, Inc.
- "Paget Peak", SummitPost.org
- Shea, Gerry (2011-08-01), The Aspiring Hiker's Guide 2: Mountain Treks in British Columbia, Rocky Mountain Books, ISBN 978-1-926855-85-1
- Wilmarth, M. Grace (1938), Lexicon of Geologic Names of the United States: M-Z, U.S. Government Printing Office
