= Daly =

Daly or DALY may refer to:

== Places ==
=== Australia ===
- County of Daly, a cadastral division in South Australia
- Daly River, Northern Territory, a locality
- Daly River (Northern Territory), the river
- Electoral division of Daly, an electorate in the Northern Territory
- Daly, Northern Territory, a locality
- Victoria Daly Regional Council, a local government area in the Northern Territory

=== Elsewhere ===
- Daly (lunar crater), a crater on the Moon
- Daly (Martian crater), a crater on Mars
- Daly, Russia, a village (selo) in the Sakha Republic, Russia
- Daly City, California, United States
- Rural Municipality of Daly, Manitoba, Canada
- Daly College, India
- Daly Range, Greenland

== People ==
=== Given name ===
- Daly Cherry-Evans (born 1989), Australian Rugby League player
- Daly Santana (born 1995), Puerto Rican indoor volleyball player

=== Surname ===
- Daly (surname)

== Other uses ==
- Daly detector, a type of mass spectrometry detector
- Daly languages, group of Australian aboriginal languages
- Disability-adjusted life year (DALY), a measure of burden of disease
- Mount Daly, several mountains in Canada and the United States
- USS Daly (DD-519), a Fletcher-class destroyer

== See also ==
- Daily (disambiguation)
- Dailey, surname
- Daley (disambiguation)
- Dealey (disambiguation)
- Daly Waters (disambiguation)
- Douglas-Daly (disambiguation)
- Justice Daly (disambiguation)
