= Sherbrooke Lake (British Columbia) =

Lake in British Columbia, Canada

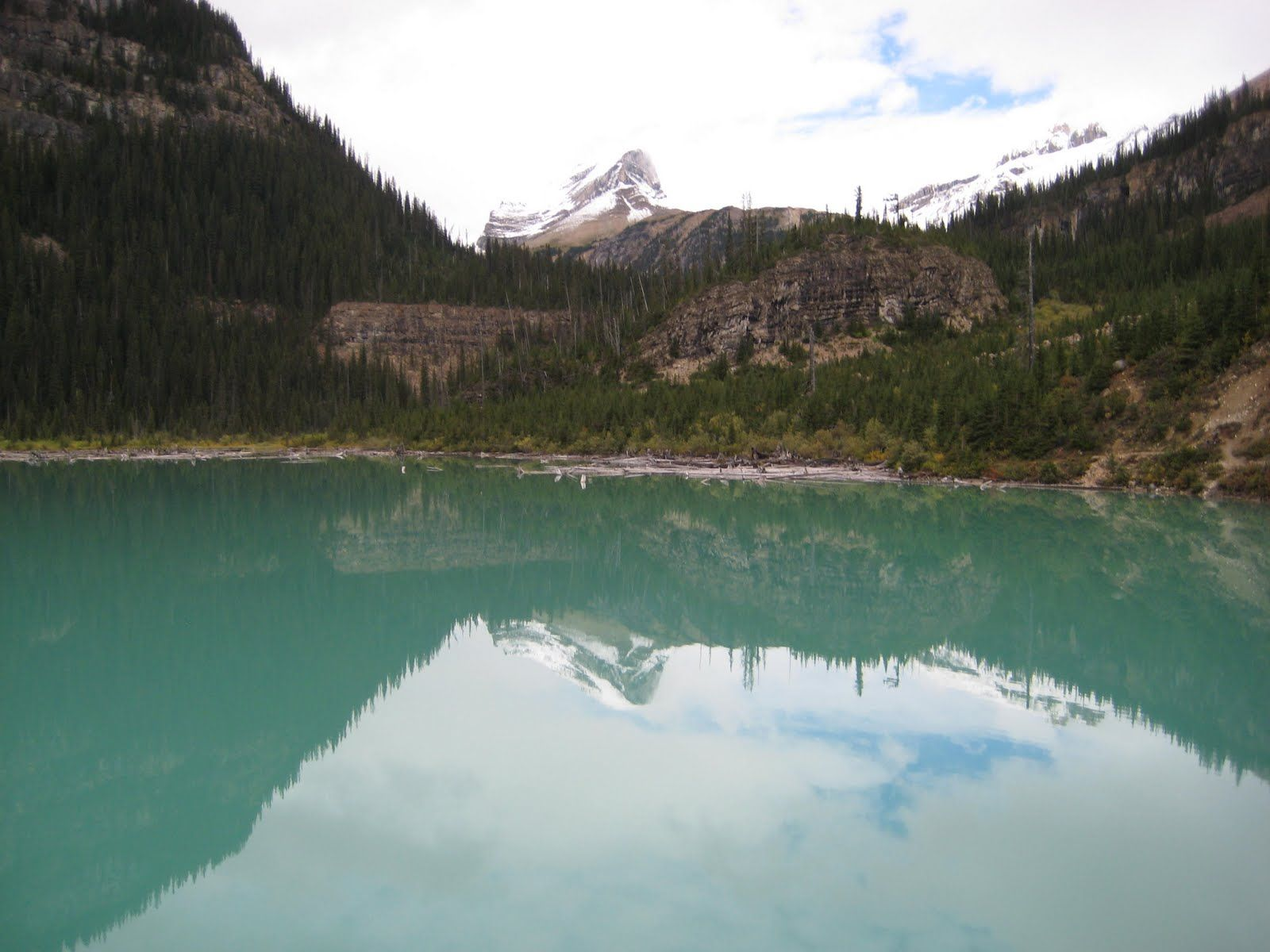
- Sherbrooke Lake

- Location within British Columbia
- Location: Yoho National Park
- Coordinates: 51°27′30″N 116°23′16″W
- Primary inflows: Sherbrooke Creek
- Primary outflows: Sherbrooke Creek
- Basin countries: Canada
- Settlements: None

Sherbrooke Lake is a lake in Yoho National Park, British Columbia, Canada. The lake is bounded on the west by Mount Ogden 2,695 m (8,842 ft), Mount Niles 2,972 m (9,751 ft) to the north, and Paget Peak on the east side. The lake can be reached by following a three km hiking trail that begins from the Trans-Canada Highway across from Wapta Lake.

Sherbrooke Lake also serves as an access point for mountaineering access to the Waputik Icefield and the Scott Duncan Hut.

== See also ==
- List of lakes of Yoho National Park
