= Leanchoil station =

Former railway station in British Columbia, Canada

Leanchoil
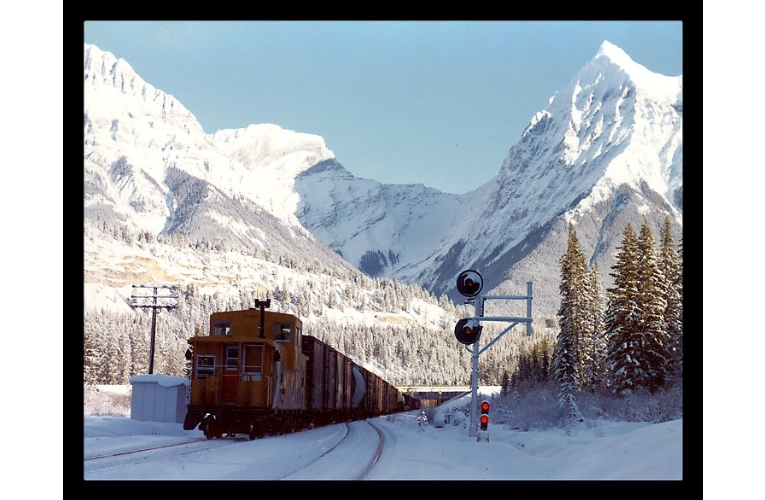
- CP train departing station

General information
- Location: British Columbia; Canada
- Coordinates: 51°13′18.3″N 116°37′06.9″W
- Train operators: Canadian Pacific Railway

Former services
| Preceding station | Canadian Pacific Railway | Following station |
|---|---|---|
| Golden toward Vancouver | Main Line | Field toward Montreal Windsor |
Location

Leanchoil station was a railway station near Golden, British Columbia on the Canadian Pacific Railway. It bears the name of the farm near Forres, Scotland where Lord Strathcona had grown up with his mother.

The government of British Columbia geographic names website describes the location as "On Canadian Pacific Railway, NW. of junction of Beaverfoot and Kicking Horse Rivers, Kootenay Land District".
