= Mount Daly (Colorado) =

Mount Daly (Colorado) may refer to:

- Mount Daly (Gunnison County, Colorado) in Gunnison County, Colorado, United States
- Mount Daly (Pitkin County, Colorado) in Pitkin County, Colorado, United States
