= Dealey =

Dealey may refer to:

- Dealey Plaza, a square in downtown Dallas, Texas, named for George B. Dealey, and known as the scene of the John F. Kennedy assassination on November 22, 1963.
- George Bannerman Dealey Montessori Academy, an elementary school and located in the Preston Royal area of north Dallas, Texas.
- USS Dealey, a US Navy destroyer escort ship, named for Medal of Honor Commander Sam Dealey

== People ==
- Dealey (surname)

== See also ==
- The Dealey Lama, a character in The Illuminatus! Trilogy
- Daly (disambiguation)
- Daley (disambiguation)
- Deeley
