= Mount Daly =

Mount Daly may refer to:

- Mount Daly (Waputik Range) in Yoho National Park, Alberta/British Columbia, Canada
- Mount Daly (Cascade Range) in British Columbia, Canada
- Mount Daly (Gunnison County, Colorado) in Gunnison County, Colorado, United States
- Mount Daly (Pitkin County, Colorado) in Pitkin County, Colorado, United States
