= Mount Niles =

Mountain in Yoho NP, BC, Canada

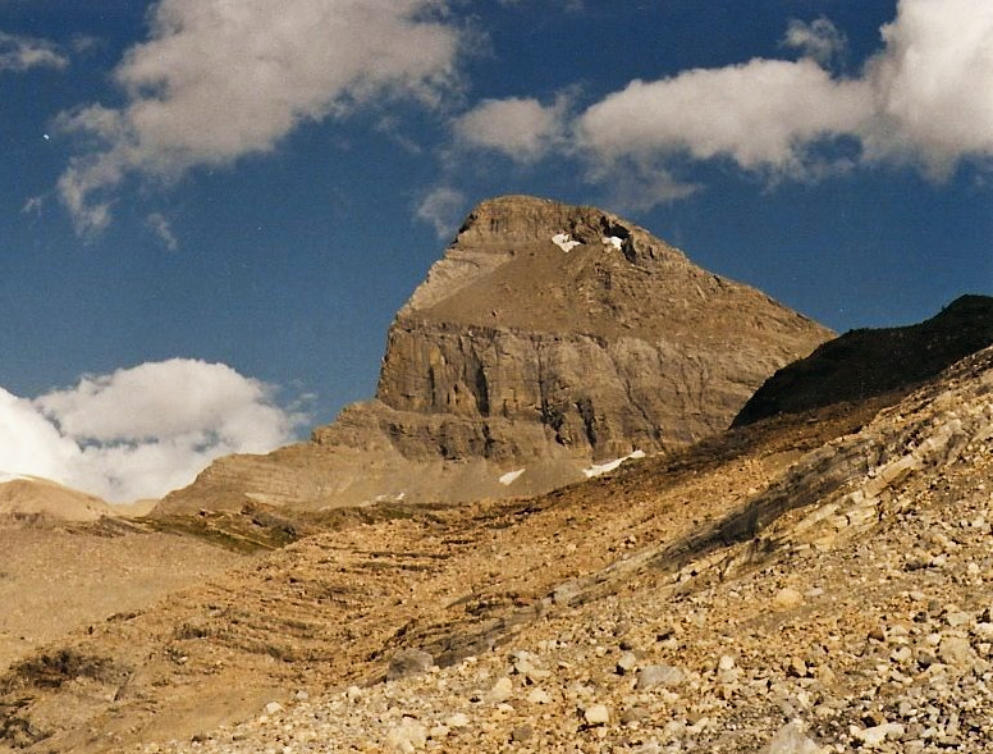
- Mount Niles

Highest point
- Elevation: 2,967 m (9,734 ft)
- Prominence: 362 m (1,188 ft)
- Parent peak: Mount Daly (3148 m)
- Listing: Mountains of British Columbia
- Coordinates: 51°30′18″N 116°25′16″W

Geography
- Location within British Columbia Location within Canada
- Interactive map of Mount Niles
- Location: Yoho National Park; British Columbia, Canada
- District: Kootenay Land District
- Parent range: Waputik Range; Canadian Rockies
- Topo map: NTS 82N9 Hector Lake

Geology
- Rock age: Cambrian
- Rock type: sedimentary rock

Climbing
- First ascent: 1898 D. Campbell, C.E. Fay
- Easiest route: Scrambling

Mount Niles is a 2,967-metre (9,734-foot) summit located in the Waputik Range of Yoho National Park, in the Canadian Rockies of British Columbia, Canada. The nearest higher peak is Mount Daly, 1.63 km (1.01 mi) to the immediate northeast. Takakkaw Falls is situated four km to the west, the Waputik Icefield lies to the north, and Sherbrooke Lake lies to the south. Precipitation runoff from Mount Niles drains into the Yoho River and Niles Creek, both tributaries of the Kicking Horse River. Topographic relief is significant as the summit rises approximately 1,500 meters (4,920 feet) above Yoho Valley in four kilometers (2.5 mile).

== History ==
Charles Sproull Thompson (1869–1921) named the peak in 1898, for William H. Niles (1838–1910), president of the Appalachian Mountain Club and Professor of Geology at Massachusetts Institute of Technology who also did some mountaineering in the area.

The first ascent of the mountain was made in 1898 by D. Campbell and Charles E. Fay.

The mountain's toponym was officially adopted in 1924 by the Geographical Names Board of Canada.

== Geology ==
Mount Niles is composed of sedimentary rock laid down during the Precambrian to Jurassic periods. Formed in shallow seas, this sedimentary rock was pushed east and over the top of younger rock during the Laramide orogeny.

== Climate ==
Based on the Köppen climate classification, Mount Niles is located in a subarctic climate zone with cold, snowy winters, and mild summers. Winter temperatures can drop below −20 °C with wind chill factors below −30 °C.

== Gallery ==
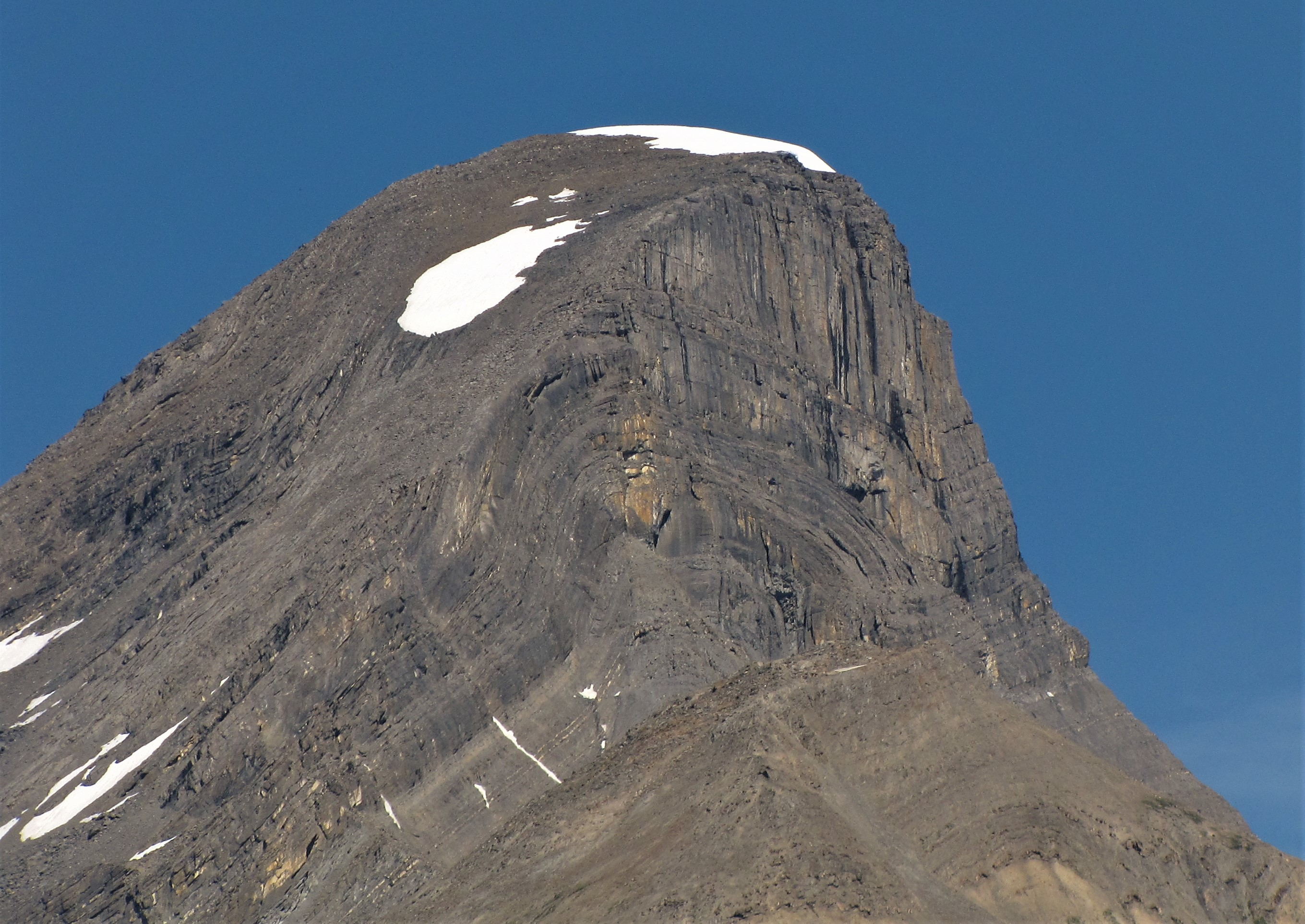
Mount Niles' south aspect seen from Sherbrooke Lake

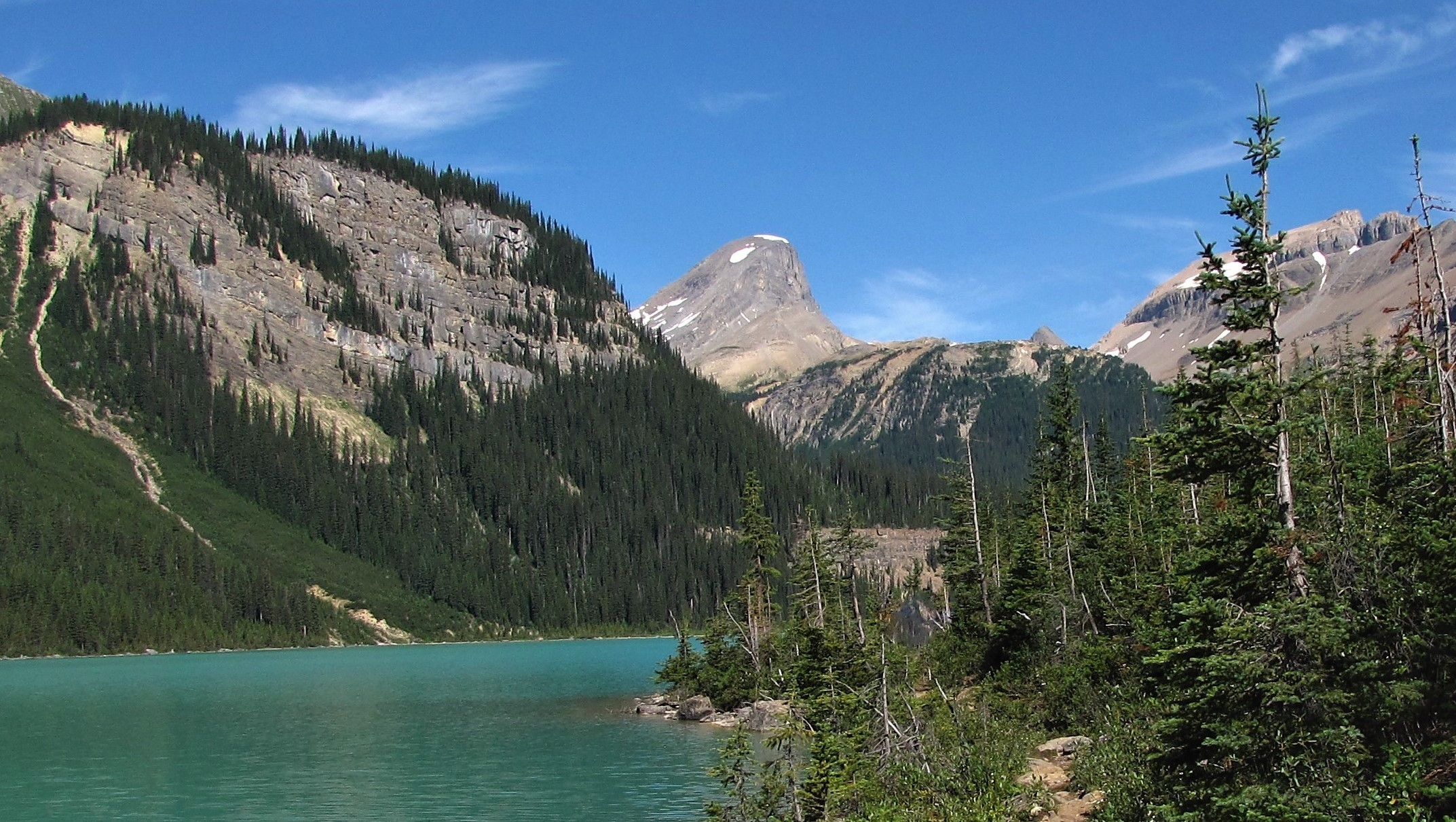
Mount Niles (centered in the distance) seen from Sherbrooke Lake

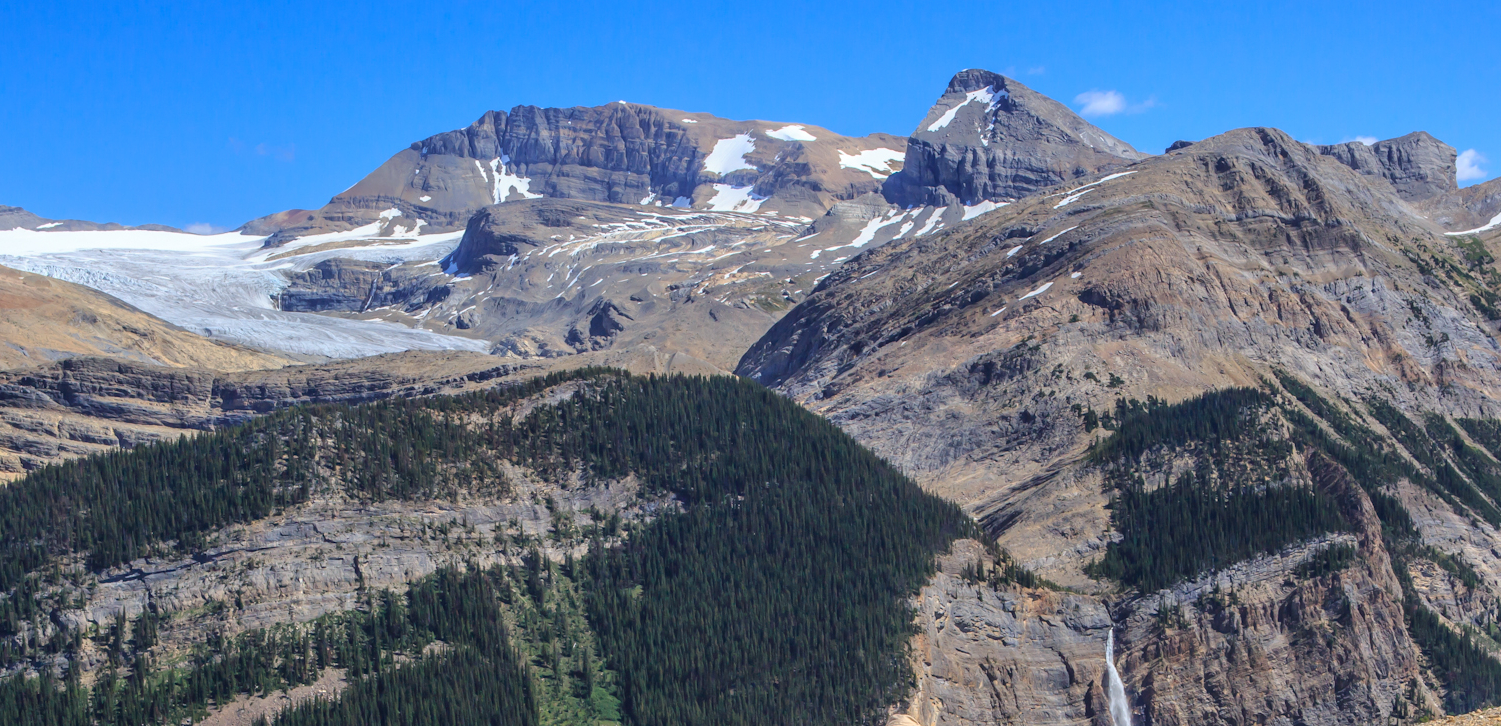
Mount Niles right of center with Mount Daly and Daly Glacier to left, and Takakkaw Falls in lower right, as seen from Iceline Trail

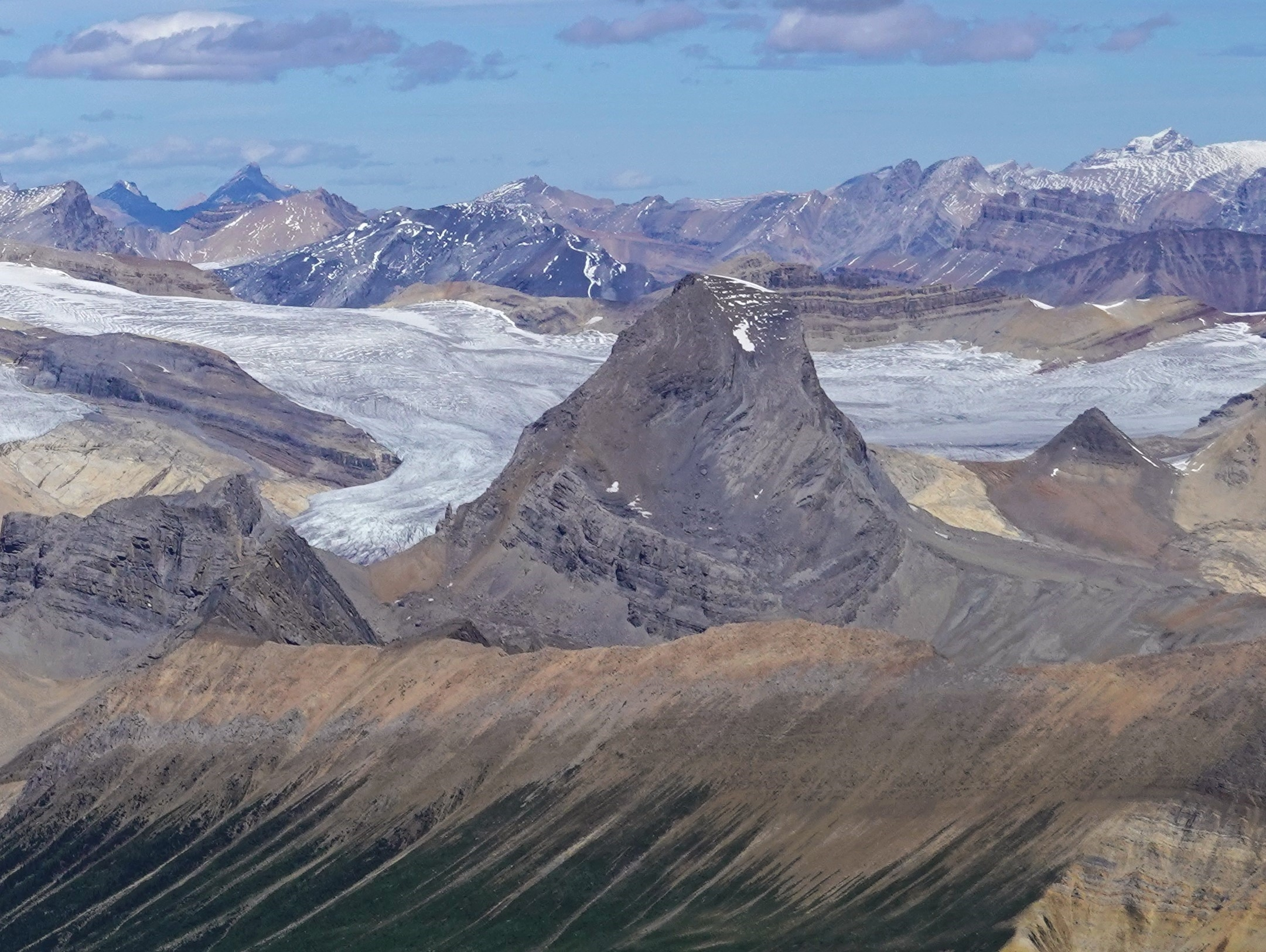
South aspect of Mount Niles viewed from Mount Stephen

== See also ==
- Geography of British Columbia
