= Wapta Falls =

Waterfalls on Kicking Horse River in Yoho National Park, British Columbia, Canada

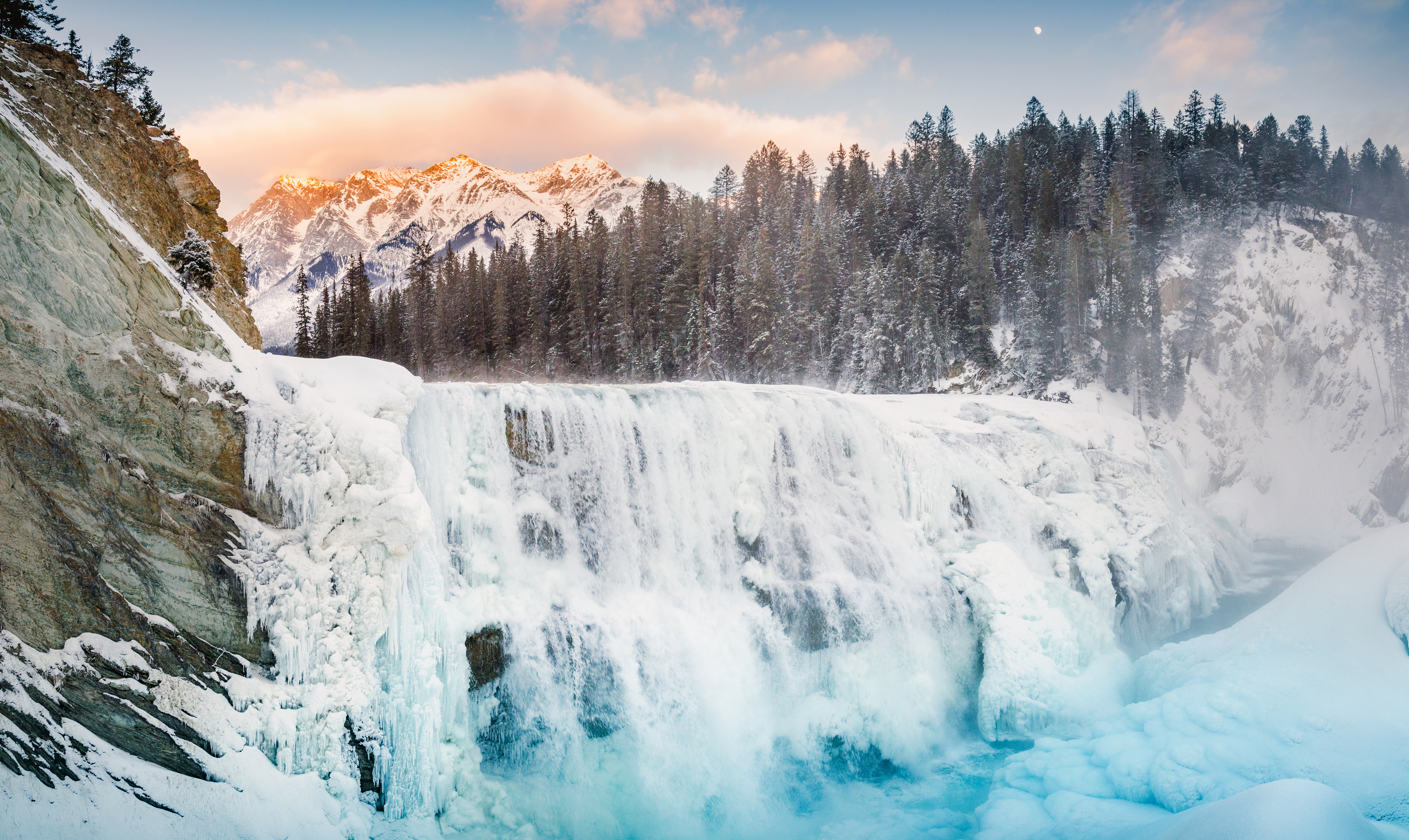
- Winter sunset by Wapta Falls
- Interactive map of Wapta Falls
- Location: Field, British Columbia, Canada
- Coordinates: 51°11′13″N 116°34′34″W
- Type: Block
- Total height: 18 m (59 ft)
- Number of drops: 1
- Total width: 107 m (351 ft)
- Average width: 101 m (331 ft)
- Watercourse: Kicking Horse River
- Average flow rate: 96 m (315 ft)

Wapta Falls is a waterfall of the Kicking Horse River located in Yoho National Park in British Columbia, Canada. It is the largest waterfall of the Kicking Horse River, at about 18 metres (59 ft) high and 107 metres (351 ft) wide. Its average flow can reach 96 cubic metres per second (3,400 cu ft/s). The name stems from a Nakoda word meaning "river".

== Use in a film ==
Le Ruffian, (1983) - Actors; Lino Ventura, Bernard Giraudeau, Claudia Cardinale, Beatrix Van Til, Pierre Frag.

== See also ==
- List of waterfalls
- List of waterfalls of Canada
- List of waterfalls in British Columbia
