= Daly Waters =

Daly Waters may refer to:

- Daly Waters, Northern Territory, a town and locality in Australia
- Daly Waters Airfield, an airfield in the Northern Territory of Australia
- Daly Waters frog, species of frog

== See also ==
- Daly (disambiguation)
