= Kicking Horse Pass =

Mountain pass in Canada, between Alberta and British Columbia

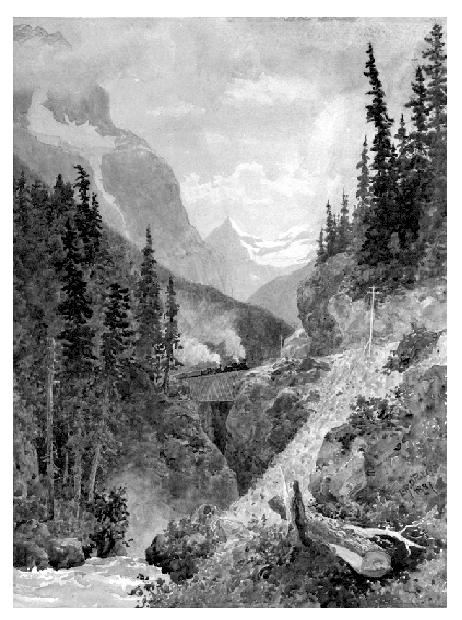
- 1887 painting

- Location within Alberta Location within British Columbia Location within Canada
- Elevation: 1,627 metres (5,338 ft)
- Traversed by: Trans-Canada Highway; Canadian Pacific Railway

Third Approach
- Location: Banff National Park, Alberta / Yoho National Park, British Columbia, Canada
- Range: Canadian Rockies
- Coordinates: 51°27′09″N 116°17′09″W
- Topo map: NTS 82N8 Lake Louise

National Historic Site of Canada
- Official name: Kicking Horse Pass National Historic Site of Canada
- Designated: 1971

Kicking Horse Pass (el. 1,627 metres; 5,338 ft) is a high mountain pass across the Continental Divide of the Americas of the Canadian Rockies on the Alberta–British Columbia border, and lying within Yoho and Banff national parks. Divide Creek forks onto both sides of the continental divide.

== Explorers ==
First Nations had known and used the pass, but it was first explored by Europeans in 1858 by the Palliser Expedition led by Captain John Palliser. It and the adjacent Kicking Horse River were named after James Hector (Hector's Branch Expeditions, 3 August 1858 – 26 May 1859), was kicked by his horse while attempting rescue of another horse that had gone into the river. Hector was led to the pass by his Stoney Nakoda guide Hector Nimrod.

From Hector's summary, which appears on pages 105–106 of Palliser's diary,

Here we met a very large stream, equal in size to Bow River where we crossed it. This river descends the valley from the north-west, and, on entering the wide valley of Beaverfoot River, turns back on its course at a sharp angle, receives that river as a tributary, and flows off to the south-west through the other valley. Just above the angle there is a fall about 40 feet [12 m] in height, where the channel is contracted by perpendicular rocks.

A little way above this fall, one of our pack horses, to escape the fallen timber, plunged into the stream, luckily where it formed an eddy, but the banks were so steep that we had great difficulty in getting him out. In attempting to recatch my own horse, which had strayed off while we were engaged with the one in the water, he kicked me in the chest, but I had luckily got close to him before he struck out, so that I did not get the full force of the blow. However, it knocked me down and rendered me senseless for some time...

31 August.— Every morning just now we have dense fogs, that generally last till nine or ten o'clock, but the evening's are fine and clear. After travelling a mile along the left bank of the river from the N.W., which because of the accident the men had named Kicking Horse River, we crossed to the opposite side.

== Railway ==
A National Historic Site of Canada, the main line of the Canadian Pacific Railway (CPR) was constructed between Lake Louise, Alberta, and Field, British Columbia, using this route in 1884, in preference to the original survey through the more northerly Yellowhead Pass.

The original section of the CPR between the summit of the pass near Wapta Lake and Field was known as "The Big Hill". With a ruling gradient of 4.5% (1 in 23), it was the steepest stretch of main-line railroad in North America.

Owing to frequent accidents and expensive helper engines associated with railroading in the pass, the CPR built the two Spiral Tunnels that opened in 1909, replacing the direct route. Although they add several kilometres, they reduce the ruling grade to a more manageable 2.2% (1 in 46). Accidents still occur, including a major derailment in 2019 that killed three CPR employees.

== Road ==
The pack train trail over the pass, established at the time of the railway, gradually became a wagon road. In 1928, the Golden–Lake Louise highway, which essentially followed the CPR route, was completed.

British Columbia Highway 1, part of the Trans-Canada Highway was built in 1962, following a more northerly placement along the eastern approach. It reaches its highest point at Kicking Horse Pass at an elevation of 1,643 metres (5,390 ft).

The original stretch of Highway 1 through the canyon was two lanes wide with sharp corners, uneven grade and a risk of falling rocks. It had twice the provincial average of incidents and accidents. Since the 2000s, 25 kilometres of road have been rebuilt in phases to modern standards, with 4 lanes and the removal of sharp corners. The final phase was completed in August 2024.

The Golden Triangle cycling route includes the pass.

== Television ==
Dave Broadfoot played The Honourable Member for Kicking Horse Pass in the CBC Television satirical series Royal Canadian Air Farce and in his personal standup routines.

== Gallery ==
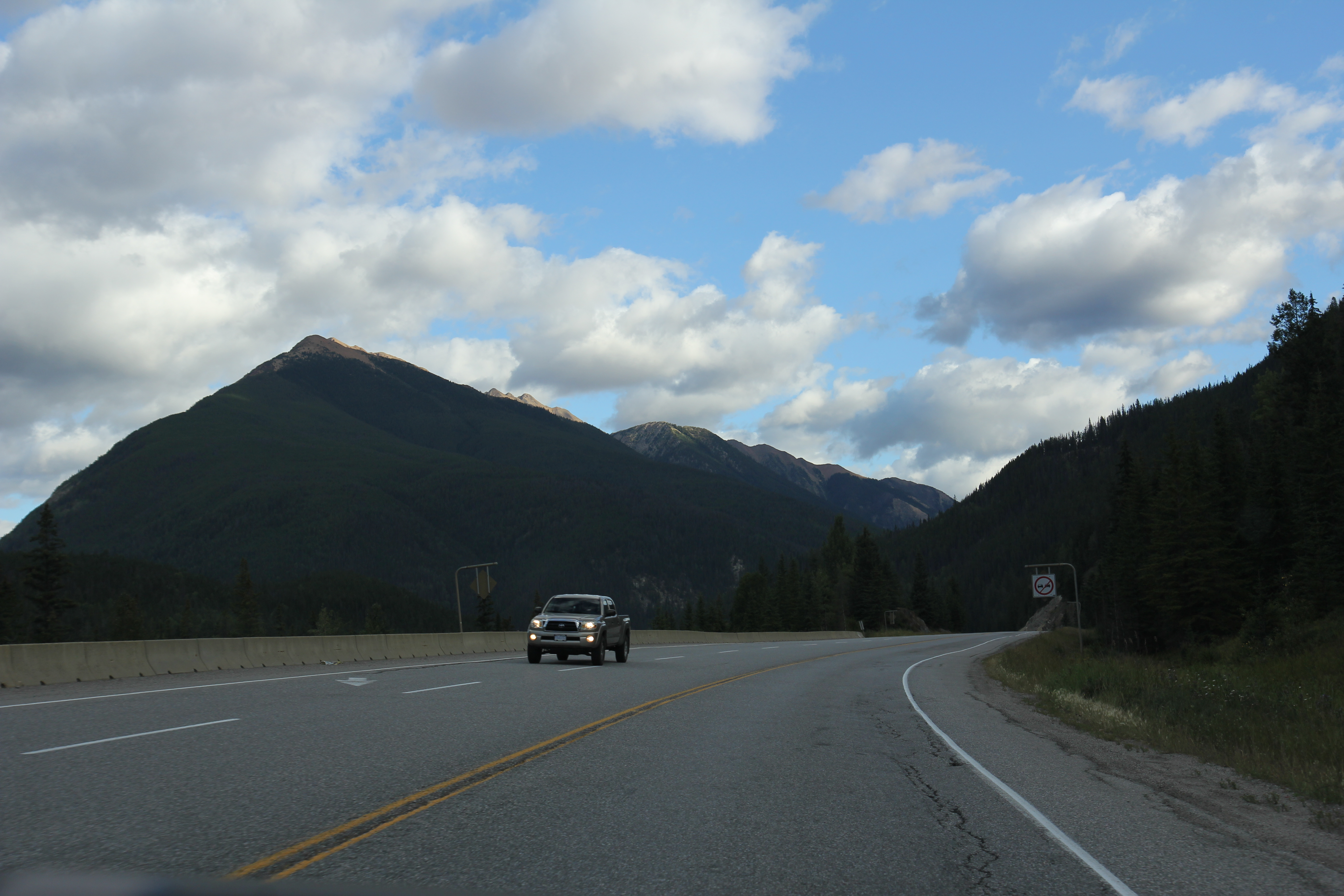
Looking east at Kicking Horse Pass from the Trans-Canada Highway

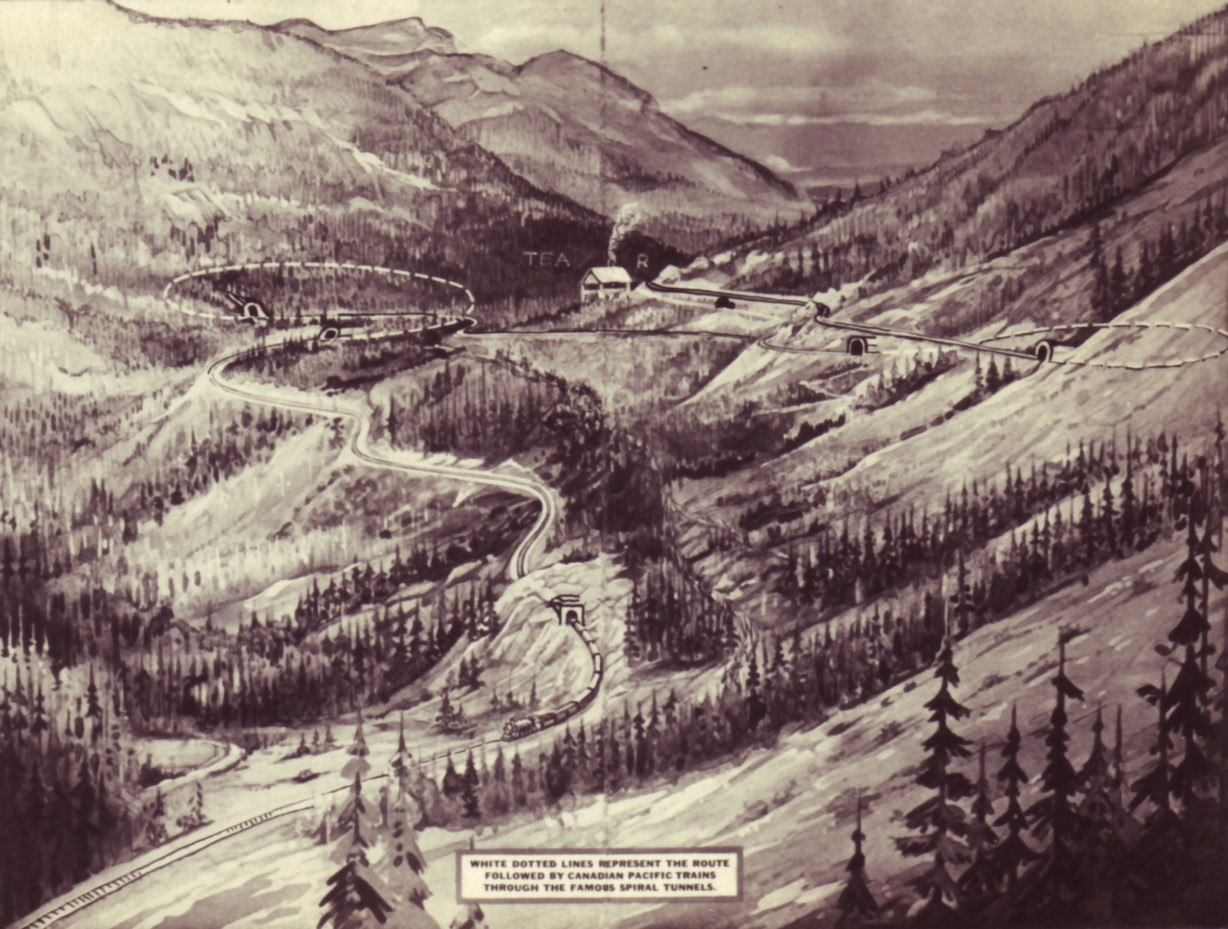
Panorama of the tunnels from the west, 1908 The Big Hill on the Canadian Pacific Railway

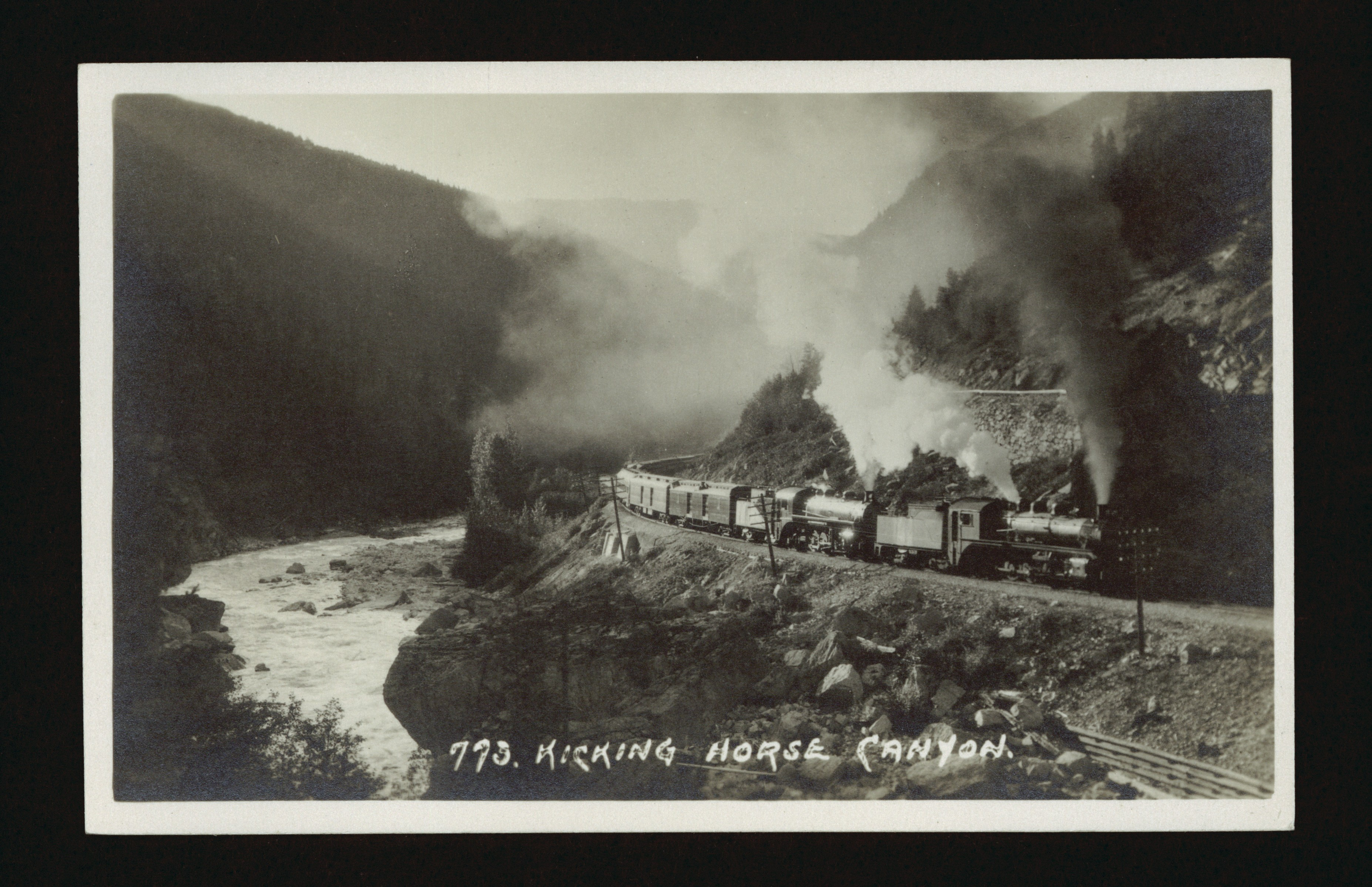
The train runs along the embankment at the side of the Kicking-Horse River pre-1942

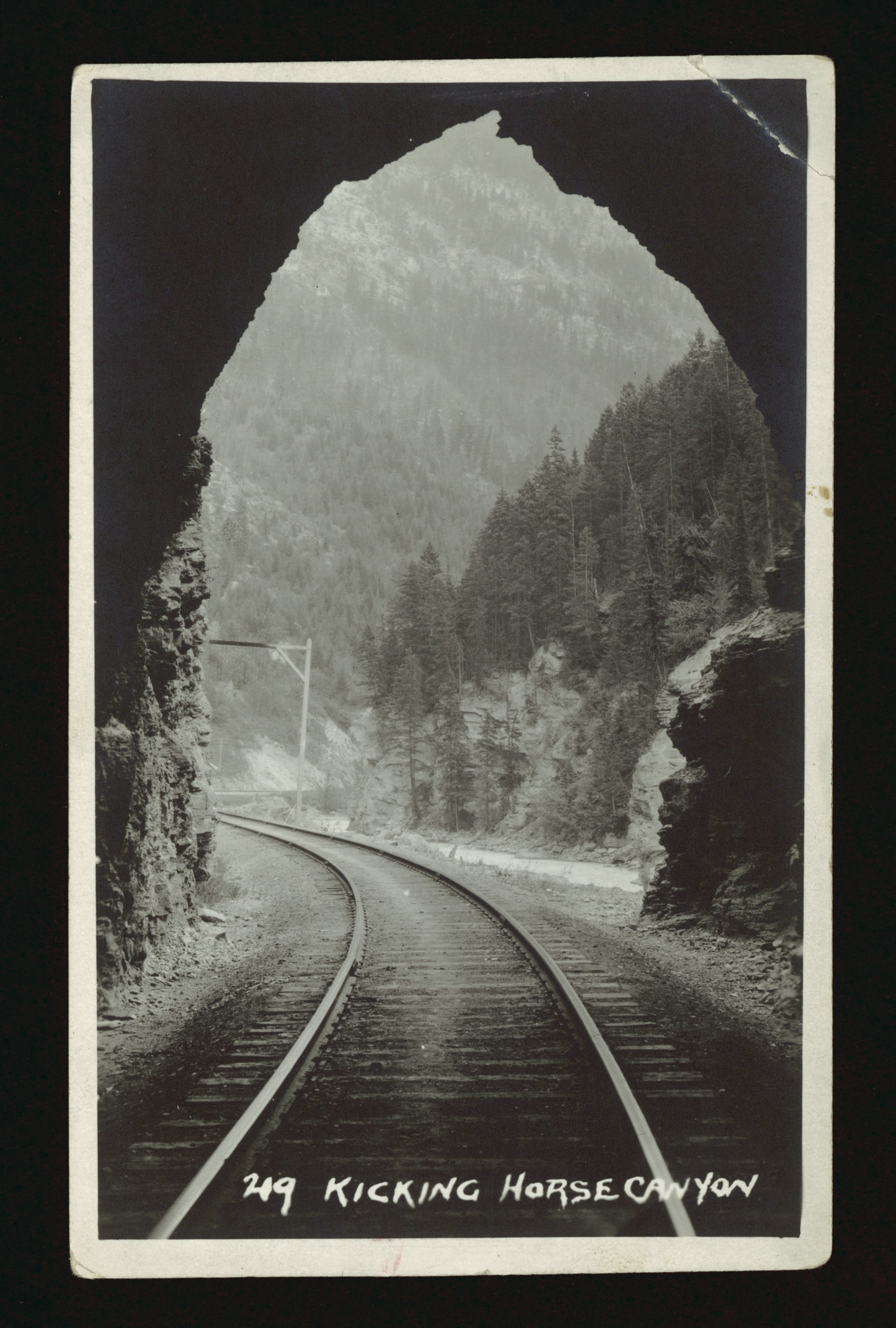
View from the tracks through a tunnel along the Canadian Pacific Railway pre-1942

== See also ==
- List of railroad crossings of the North American continental divide
- List of Rocky Mountain passes on the continental divide
