= Deeley =

Deeley is an Irish surname. Notable people with the surname include:

- Andy Deeley, New Zealand international soccer player
- Cat Deeley (born 1976), English television presenter and model
- James Deeley (born 1871), English professional soccer player
- Michael Deeley (born 1932), British film producer
- Norman Deeley (1933–2007), English professional soccer player
- Patrick Deeley (born 1953), Irish poet
- Peter Deeley, British journalist
- Richard Deeley (1855-1944), British engineer
- Trevor Deeley, Canadian motorcycle racer

== See also ==
- Mallaby-Deeley Baronets
  - Sir Harry Mallaby-Deeley, 1st Baronet (1863–1937), British politician
- Anson & Deeley boxlock action
- Deeley boppers
- Mount Deeley, Antarctic mountain
- Dealey (disambiguation)
