= Little Yoho River =

Location
- Country: Canada
- Province: British Columbia
- District: Kootenay Land District

Physical characteristics
- Source: Kiwetinok Lake
  - location: Rocky Mountains, Yoho National Park
  - coordinates: 51°31′00″N 116°35′56″W
  - elevation: 8,054 ft (2,455 m)
- Mouth: Yoho River
  - location: Upstream from Takakkaw Falls, Yoho National Park
  - coordinates: 51°31′52″N 116°30′20″W
  - elevation: 5,226 ft (1,593 m)

The Little Yoho River is a short river in British Columbia that flows east from Kiwetinok Lake, which is the highest named lake in Canada, and into the Yoho River about 4.4 kilometres (2.7 mi), upstream from the mouth of the creek that Takakkaw Falls is on. It is probably best known for Laughing Falls, an impressive plunge just above the river's mouth that is seen on the way to Twin Falls.

== See also ==
- List of rivers of British Columbia
