= Yoho River =

- Mouth of Yoho River

Location
- Country: Canada
- Province: British Columbia
- District: Kootenay Land District

Physical characteristics
- Source: Yoho Glacier
  - location: Rocky Mountains, Yoho National Park
- Mouth: Kicking Horse River
  - location: West of Big Hill, Yoho National Park
  - coordinates: 51°26′9″N 116°25′12″W
  - elevation: 1,320 m (4,330 ft)
- Discharge
  - average: 317 cuft/s

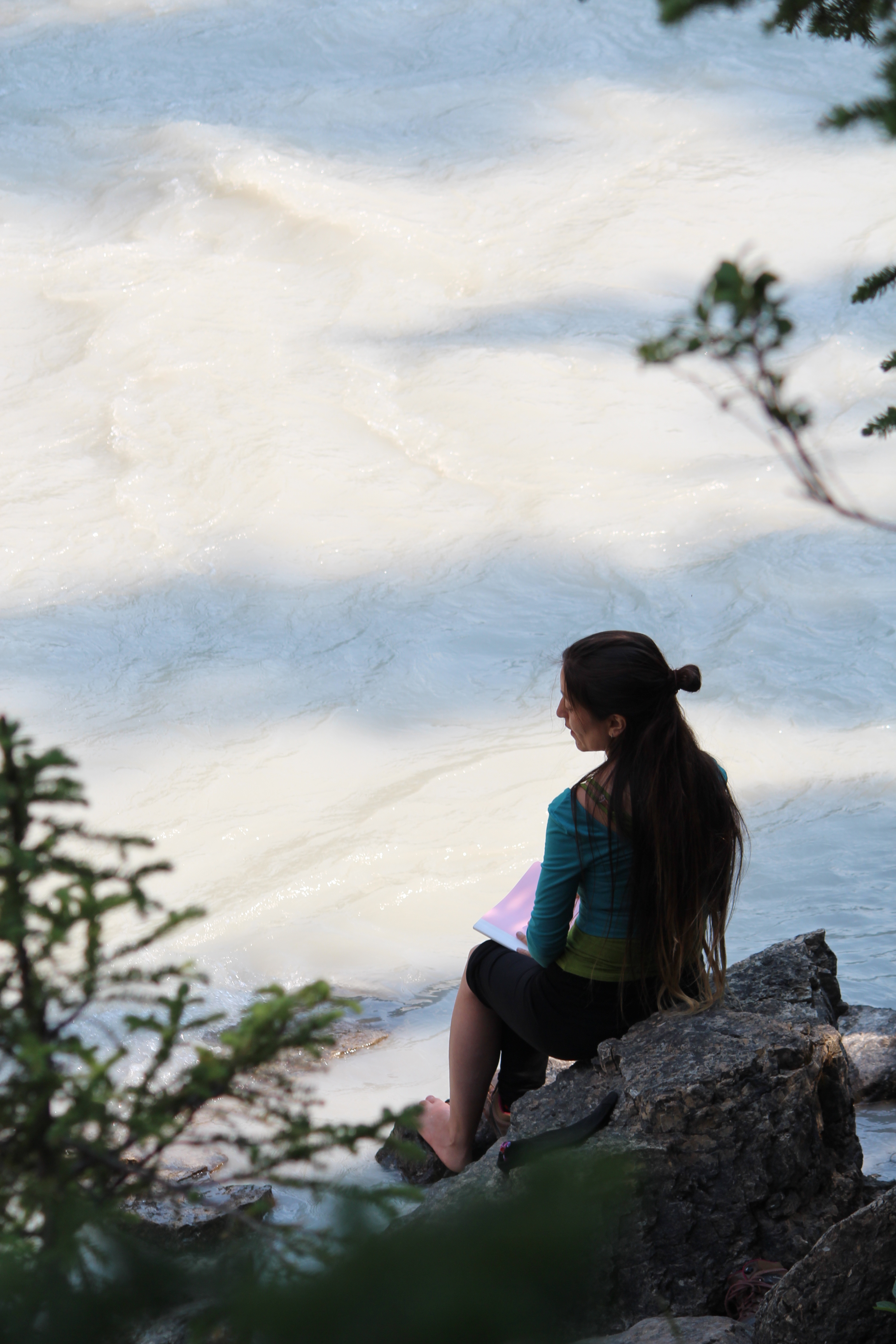
On the bank of the Yoho River

The Yoho River, until 1901 known as the North Fork Wapta River or the North Fork Kicking Horse River, is a silty, swift tributary of the Kicking Horse River in the Canadian province of British Columbia. The river is entirely within Yoho National Park.

== Course ==
The Yoho River originates at the north end of Yoho National Park and flows generally south to join the Kicking Horse River some distance northeast of Field. It begins at the toe of the Yoho Glacier and flows within 5.8 kilometres (3.6 mi) from its source it has already received the waters of Waves Creek, Twin Falls Creek, Fairy Creek & the Little Yoho River. It continues south for another 4.4 kilometres (2.7 mi) to its confluence with the stream Takakkaw Falls is on. Along that stretch is a significant canyon in which the river drops over at least one major waterfall. The river also picks up the waters of Whiskey-Jack Creek near Takakkaw Falls. From there it flows another 7.8 kilometres (4.8 mi) to its confluence with the Kicking Horse River. At the confluence, the Yoho is actually the bigger of the two rivers. It is also the siltier of the two at the time, and most of the silt the Kicking Horse has comes from the Yoho.

== See also ==
- List of rivers of British Columbia
