= Golden Triangle (cycling route) =

Cycling route in western Canada

The Golden Triangle is a major 330 kilometres (210 mi) cycling route located in western Canada along the border between British Columbia and Alberta, forming a triangle with Lake Louise, Golden, and Radium Hot Springs as its points. It crosses the Continental Divide of the Americas twice, through the Kicking Horse Pass between Lake Louise and Golden, and the Vermilion Pass between Radium Hot Springs and Lake Louise. The Triangle can be "extended" by riding to Jasper on the Icefields Parkway from Lake Louise. At its highest points the trail reaches elevations of 1,640 metres (5,380 ft).
