= Mount Bosworth =

Mountain in the country of Canada

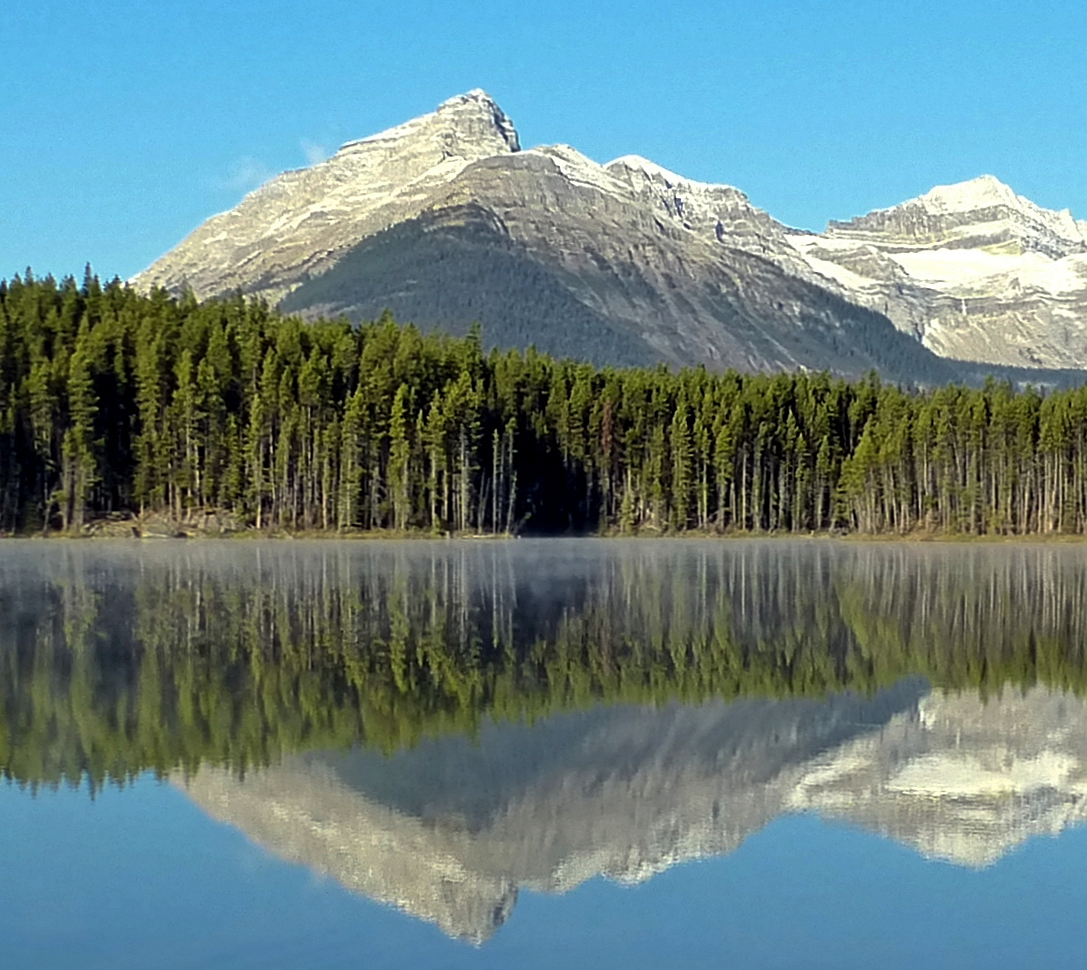
- Mount Bosworth reflected in Herbert Lake

Highest point
- Elevation: 2,769 m (9,085 ft)
- Prominence: 159 m (522 ft)
- Listing: Mountains of Alberta; Mountains of British Columbia
- Coordinates: 51°27′53″N 116°20′01″W

Geography
- Location within Alberta Location within British Columbia Location within Canada
- Country: Canada
- Provinces: Alberta and British Columbia
- Parent range: Park Ranges; Canadian Rockies
- Topo map: NTS 82N8 Lake Louise

Climbing
- First ascent: 1903 Dominion Topographic Survey
- Easiest route: Scrambling Routes

Mount Bosworth is located in the Canadian Rockies on the border of Alberta and British Columbia. The mountain is situated immediately northwest of Kicking Horse Pass and straddles the shared border of Banff National Park with Yoho National Park. It was named in 1903 after George Morris Bosworth, an executive and long-time employee of the Canadian Pacific Railway.

== Geology ==
Mount Bosworth is composed of sedimentary rock laid down during the Precambrian to Jurassic periods. Formed in shallow seas, this sedimentary rock was pushed east and over the top of younger rock during the Laramide orogeny.

== Climate ==
Based on the Köppen climate classification, Mount Bosworth is located in a subarctic climate with cold, snowy winters, and mild summers. Temperatures can drop below −20 °C with wind chill factors below −30 °C.

== See also ==
- List of peaks on the Alberta–British Columbia border

== Gallery ==
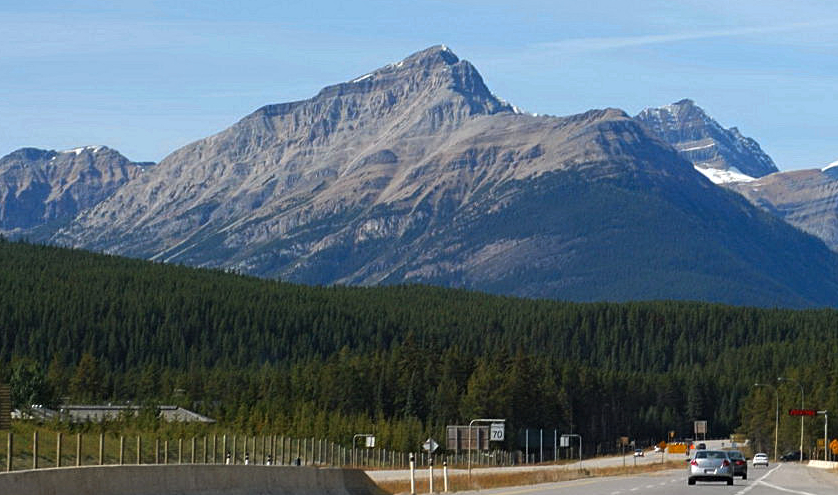
Mount Bosworth seen from Highway 1 near Lake Louise
