= Dealey (surname) =

Dealey is a surname. Notable people with the surname include:

- Edward Musgrove Dealey (1892–1969), American journalist and publisher
- George Bannerman Dealey (1859–1946), American businessman and publisher of The Dallas Morning News
- Sam Dealey, American journalist
- Samuel David Dealey (1906–1944), American submarine commanding officer during World War II
