= Justice Daly =

Justice Daly may refer to:

- Edward J. Daly (1892–1959), associate justice of the Connecticut Supreme Court
- Gene B. Daly (1917–1998), associate justice of the Montana Supreme Court

== See also ==
- Joseph E. Daily (1888–1965), associate justice of the Illinois Supreme Court
- Rudolph J. Daley (1918–1990), associate justice of the Vermont Supreme Court
