= Mount Daly (Waputik Range) =

Mountain in Yoho National Park, Canada

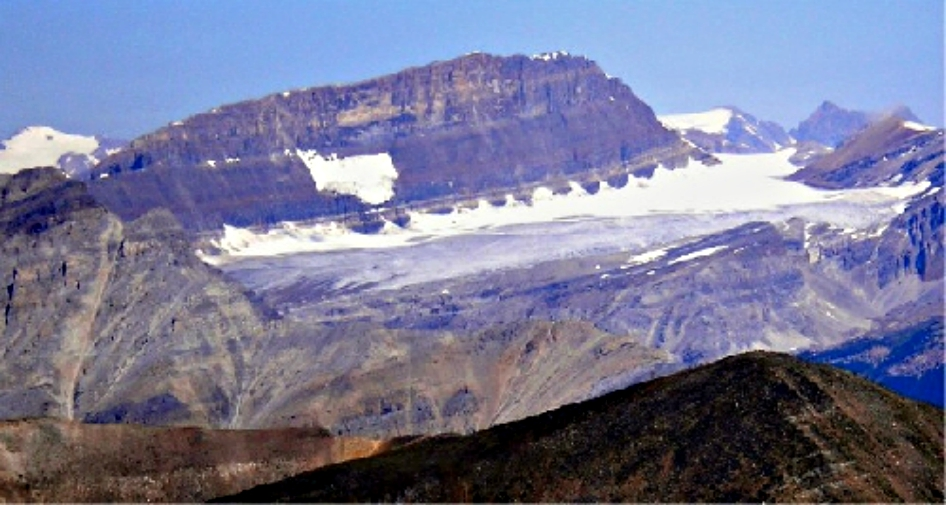
- Mount Daly and Bath Glacier

Highest point
- Elevation: 3,148 m (10,328 ft)
- Prominence: 368 m (1,207 ft)
- Parent peak: Mount Balfour (3,272 m)
- Listing: Mountains of Alberta; Mountains of British Columbia
- Coordinates: 51°31′07″N 116°23′44″W

Geography
- Location within Alberta Location within British Columbia Location within Canada
- Country: Canada
- Provinces: Alberta and British Columbia
- Parent range: Park Ranges
- Topo map: NTS 82N9 Hector Lake

Climbing
- First ascent: 1903 J.H Batcheller, C.E. Fay, E. Tewes, C. Bohren, C. Hasler Sr.

Mount Daly is located on the border of Alberta and British Columbia. It was named in 1898 by Charles E. Fay after Charles P. Daly, a geographer. Mount Niles is located two km southwest of Daly.

== Geology ==
Like other mountains in Banff Park, Mount Daly is composed of sedimentary rock laid down during the Precambrian to Jurassic periods. Formed in shallow seas, this sedimentary rock was pushed east and over the top of younger rock during the Laramide orogeny.

== Climate ==
Based on the Köppen climate classification, Mount Daly is located in a subarctic climate with cold, snowy winters, and mild summers. Temperatures can drop below -20 °C with wind chill factors below -30 °C.

== See also ==
- List of peaks on the Alberta–British Columbia border
