= Mount Daly (Gunnison County, Colorado) =

Mountain in the state of Colorado

- Location within Colorado Location within the United States

Highest point
- Elevation: 12,615 ft (3,845 m)
- Coordinates: 39°06′12″N 107°09′01″W

Geography
- Country: United States
- State: Colorado
- County: Gunnison
- Parent range: Rocky Mountains; Elk Mountains
- Topo map: USGS Marble

Mount Daly is a mountain summit in Gunnison County, Colorado, United States.

== See also ==
- Mountains of Gunnison County, Colorado
