= Kicking Horse River =

Kicking Horse River Wapta River
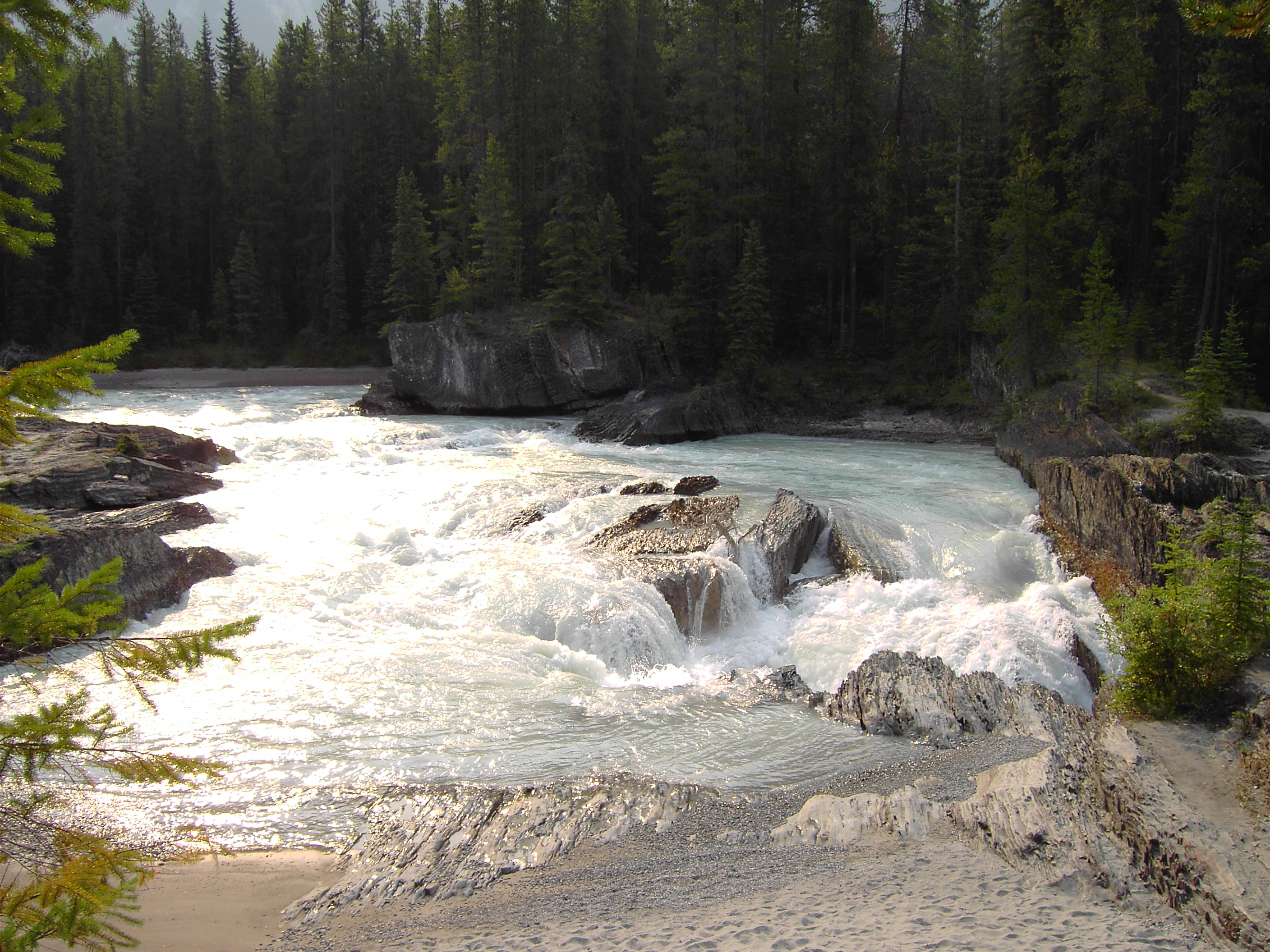
- Kicking Horse River

- Location in British Columbia

Location
- Country: Canada
- Province: British Columbia
- District: Kootenay Land District

Physical characteristics
- Source: Wapta Lake
  - location: Yoho National Park
- Mouth: Columbia River
  - location: Golden
  - coordinates: 51°18′N 116°59′W
- Discharge
  - location: near Golden
  - average: 40.9 m^{3}/s (1,440 cu ft/s)
  - minimum: 2.25 m^{3}/s (79 cu ft/s)
  - maximum: 402 m^{3}/s (14,200 cu ft/s)

The Kicking Horse River is in the Canadian Rockies of southeastern British Columbia, Canada. The river was named in 1858, when James Hector, a member of the Palliser Expedition, reported being kicked by his packhorse while exploring the river. Hector named the river as a result of the incident. Until 1901, the river was also sometimes known as the Wapta River.

The associated mountain pass, Kicking Horse Pass, which connects through the Rockies to the valley of the Bow River, was the route through the mountains subsequently taken by the Canadian Pacific Railway when it was constructed during the 1880s. The railway's Big Hill and associated Spiral Tunnels are in the Kicking Horse valley and were necessitated by the steep rate of descent of the river and its valley.

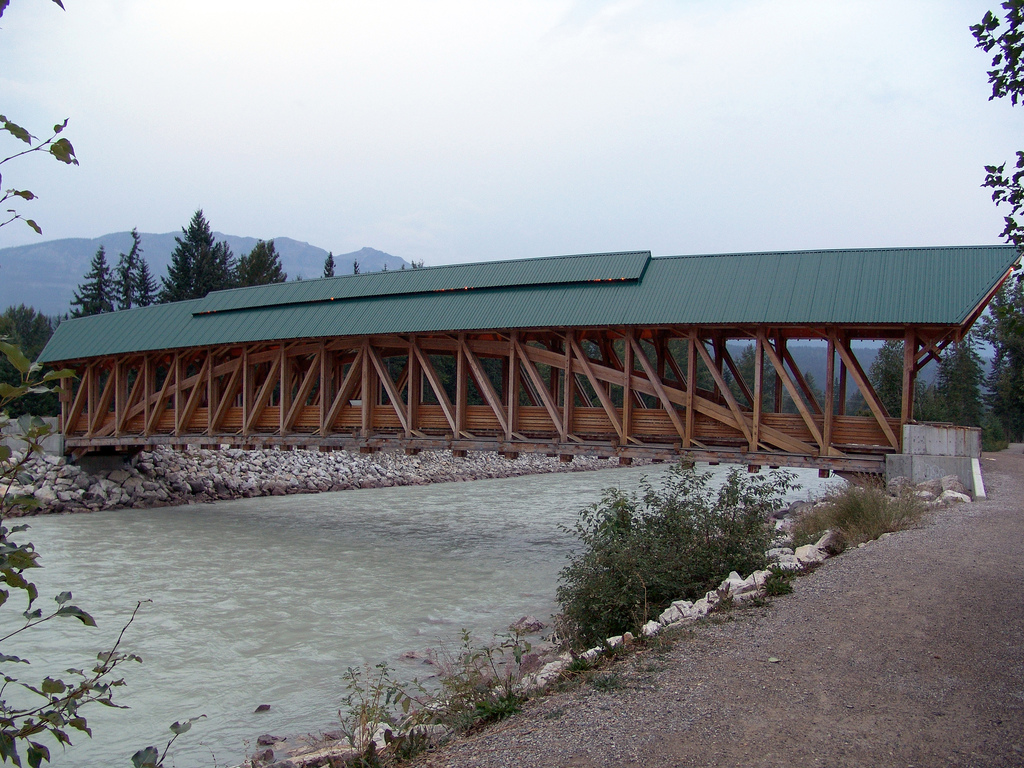
Kicking Horse Pedestrian Bridge

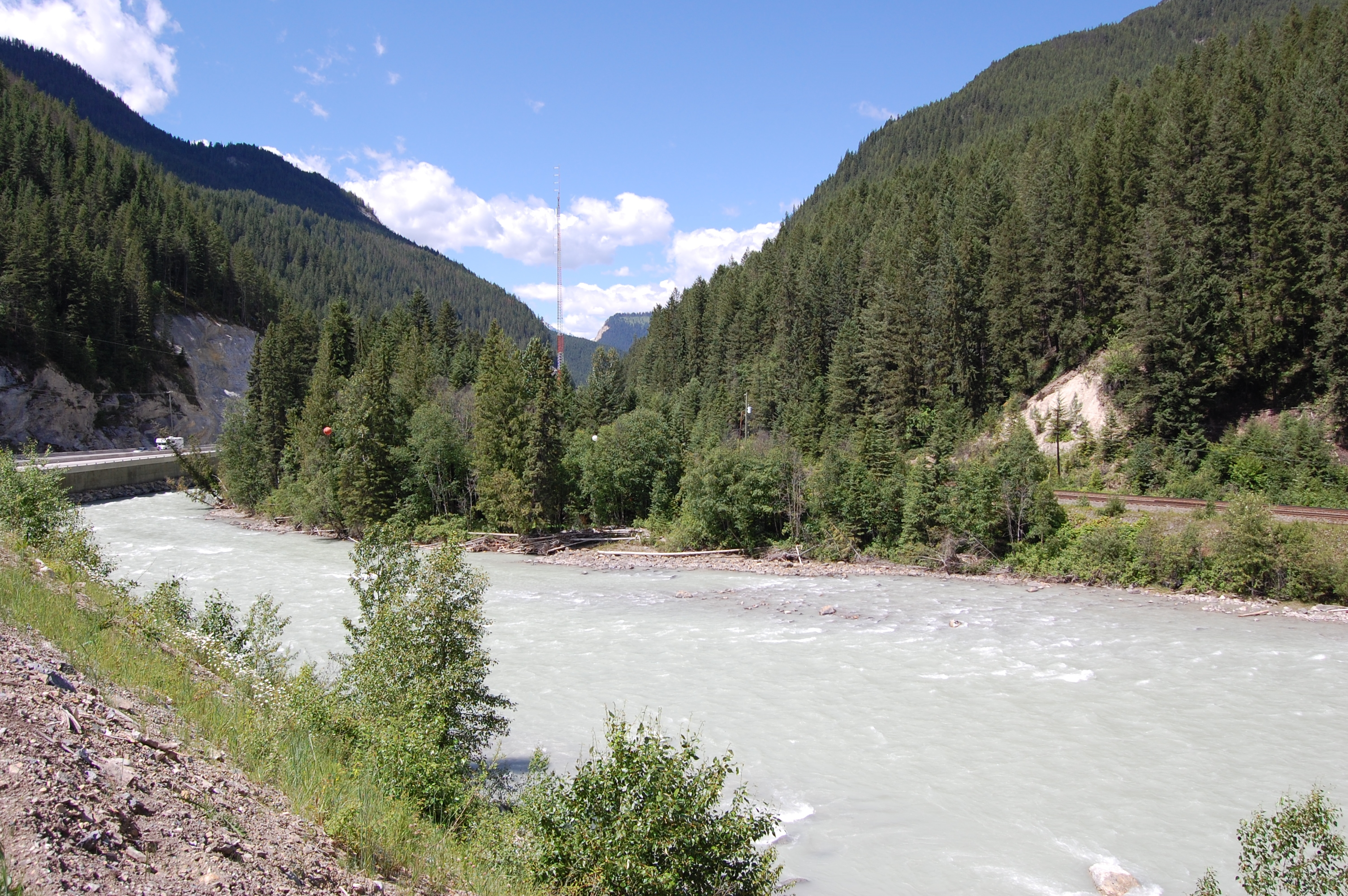
Kicking Horse River at Park Bridge rest area near Golden. Trans Canada Highway on left, CPR mainline on right

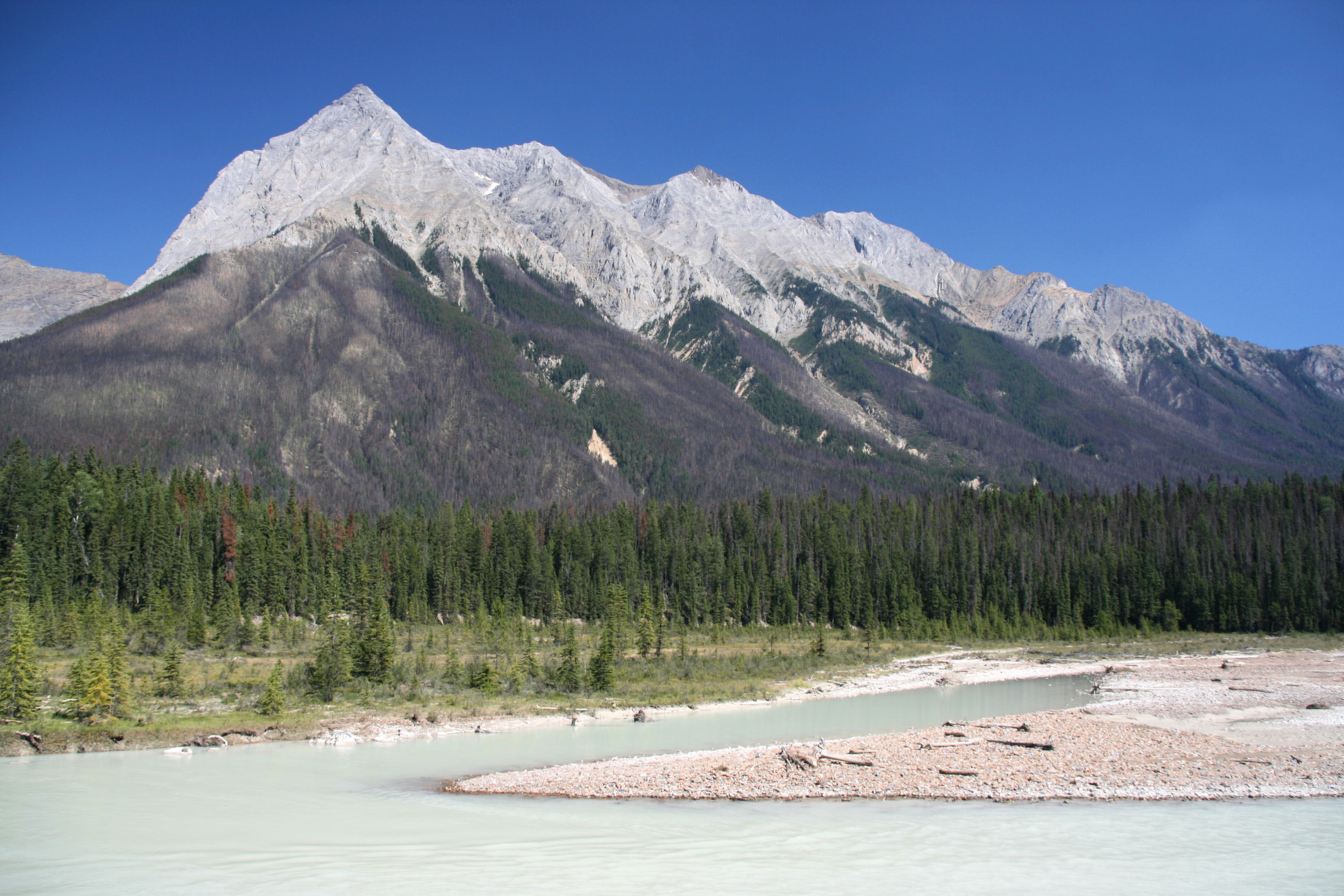
Kicking Horse River at the feet of Chancellor Peak

Kicking Horse Pedestrian Bridge in Golden is the longest authentic covered timber-frame bridge in Canada. Planned as a community project by the Timber Framers Guild, local volunteers were joined by carpenters and timber framers from Canada, the United States and Europe. The bridge structure is 150 feet (46 m) long, with a 210,000-pound (95,000 kg) Burr arch structure. The bridge was completed in September 2001.

The Trans-Canada Highway traverses the river at several points from Yoho National Park to Golden, British Columbia. The river is spanned by the new Park Bridge. Kicking Horse Mountain Resort, named for the river and pass, is located in the Dogtooth Range of the Purcell Mountains, on the west side of the town of Golden.

== Course ==
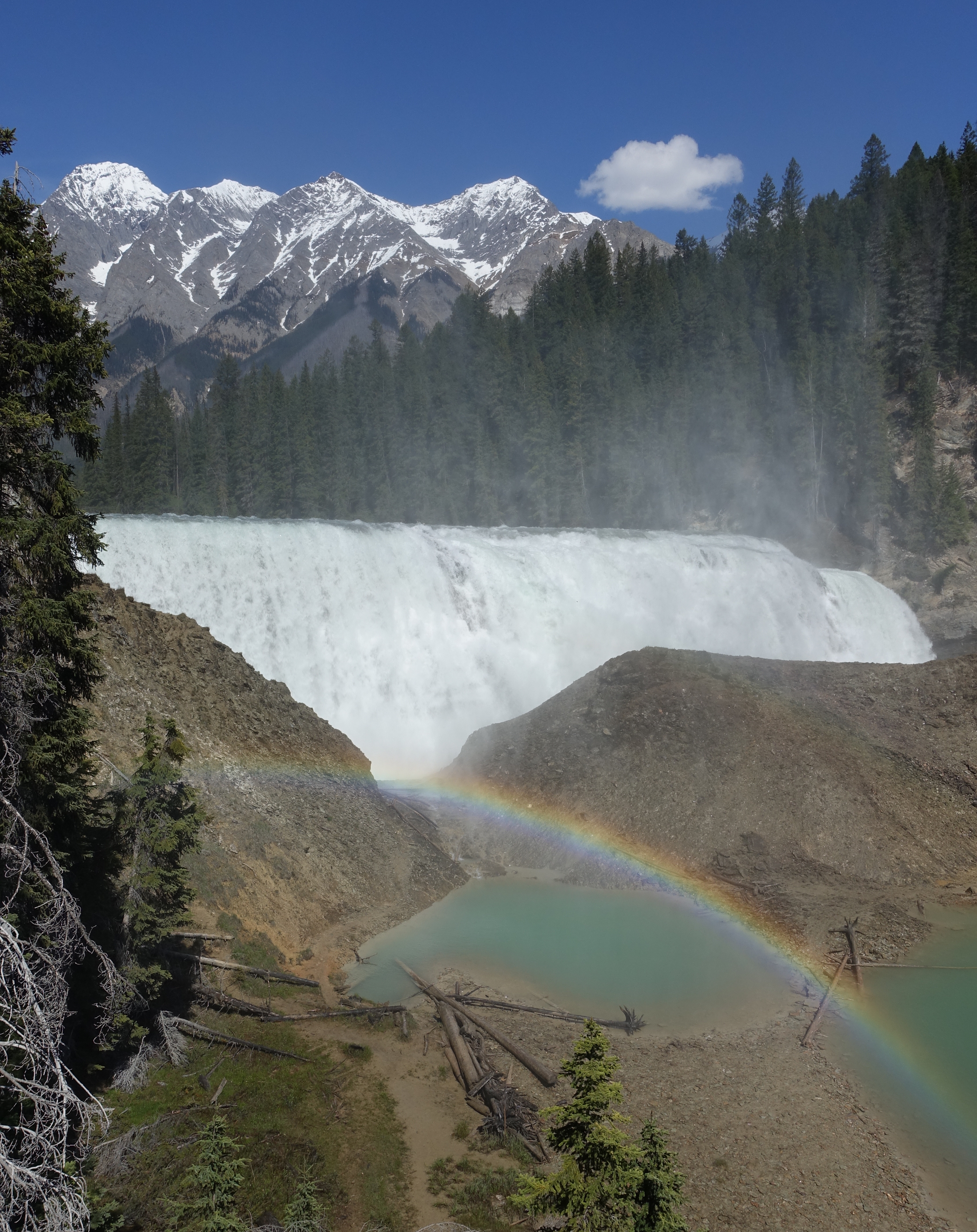
Wapta Falls on Kicking Horse River

The Kicking Horse River begins at the outlet of small Wapta Lake and flows southwest. It receives the Yoho River upstream from Field. The river continues to flow southwest until after it drops over Wapta Falls, when it takes a near hairpin turn and flows northwest into the Columbia River in Golden.

== Waterfalls ==
The river has three waterfalls along its stretch. The first is the Kicking Horse Cascade, a long talus cascade which occurs just below the first highway crossing of the river below Wapta Lake. The second is the Natural Bridge Falls near Field. The final and largest is 100-foot (30 m) Wapta Falls, one of the largest waterfalls in Canada in both volume and width. They are over 500 feet (150 m) wide.

== Natural history ==
=== History ===
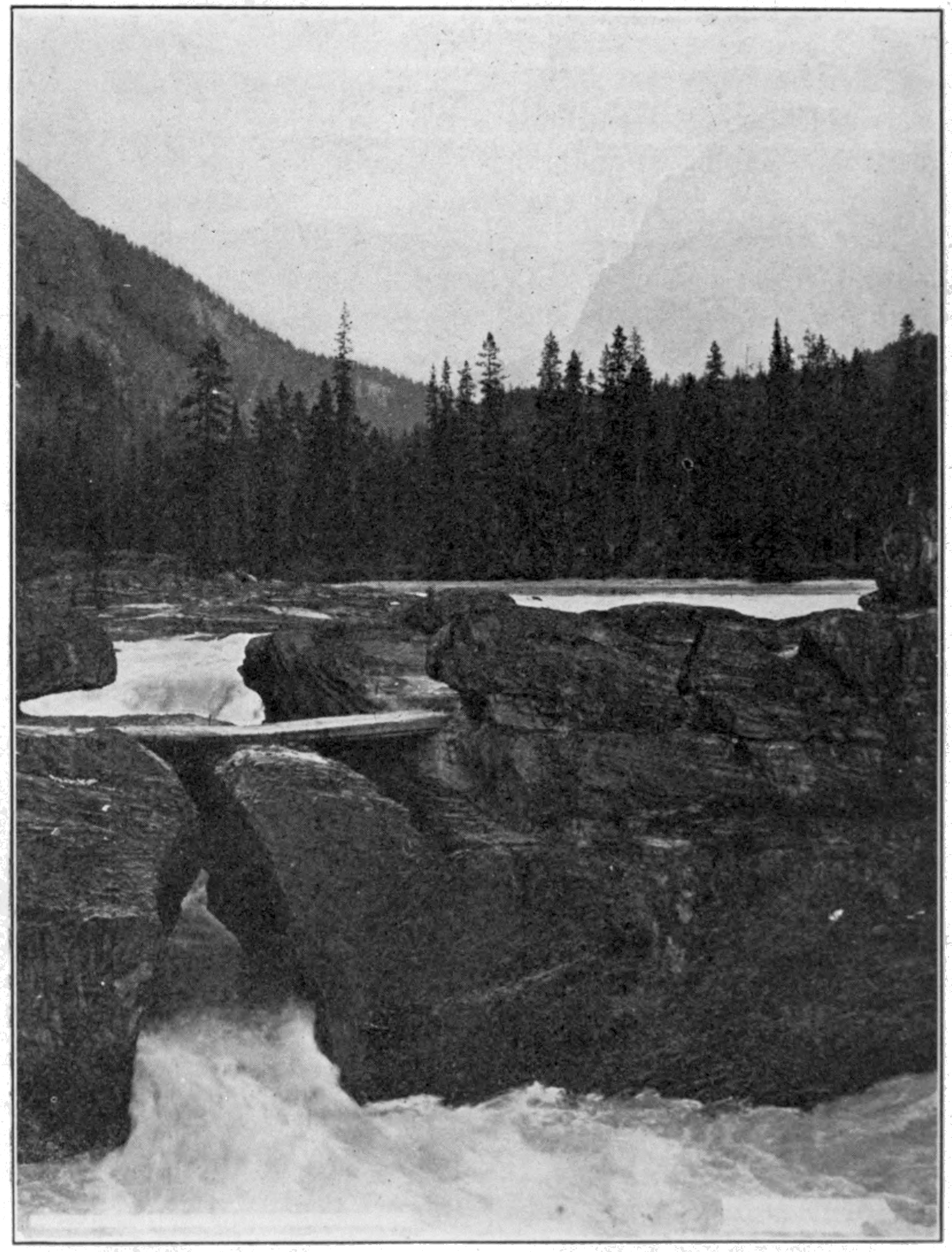
Natural bridge across the Kicking Horse River

The River’s unusual name stems from an incident near Wapta Falls in August 1858, Sir James Hector writes:

"A little way above this fall one of our pack horses, to escape the fallen timber, plunged into the river, luckily where it formed an eddy, but the banks were so steep that we had great difficulty in getting him out. In attempting to recatch my own horse, which had strayed off while we were engaged with the one in the water, he kicked me in the chest, but I had luckily got close to him before he struck out, so that I did not get the full force of the blow. However, it knocked me down and rendered me senseless for some time. This was unfortunate, as we had seen no tracks of game in the neighbourhood, and were now without food; but I was so hurt that we could not proceed further that day at least." - James Hector chronicles, 1858

=== James Hector ===
As surgeon and geologist to the Palliser Expedition from 1857 to 1860, Hector explored the country from the Red River Colony (Winnipeg) to Vancouver Island. He made many important observations regarding the geology and ethnology of the Canadian West and the Rocky Mountains, discovering the Kicking Horse Pass and giving the Kicking Horse River its name.

=== 2019 Derailment ===
On 4 February 2019, a Canadian Pacific Railway freight train with 112 cars and 3 locomotives derailed near the Big Hill of Kicking Horse Pass. The train landed in the river, and three crew members were killed.

== Recreation ==
Several whitewater rafting companies, as well as kayakers and canoeists, use the river. The first company to raft the Kicking Horse river is named Kootenay River Runners. They continue to raft trips on the Kicking Horse daily, as well as two other nearby rivers. There are three main sections of the Kicking Horse River used for such recreation. The upper canyon (accessed via Beaverfoot Road off Highway 1 West) is a class 3-4 whitewater run suitable for canoes, kayaks and rafts. Prior to a landslide in the upper canyon, boats had to portage a one kilometre stretch of rapids in order to avoid getting caught on rocks. After the landslide, the river was narrowed, allowing boats to pass freely through the rapids. Nowadays, this stretch is named Portage/Shotgun, hence the previous need to portage the area. The middle canyon (accessed via Kicking Horse rest area) is a class 4-5, depending on water levels. This run is suitable only for experienced kayakers and rafters. Commercial rafting companies avoid this section, due to the risk involved. The lower canyon is another class 3-4 whitewater run that is run by commercial rafting companies at suitable water levels. Prior to the start of the 2016 rafting season, Canadian Pacific railway installed a gate, prohibiting road access to the lower-canyon. Because of this, many rafting companies have been forced to stop rafting this portion of the river, resulting in revenue and job loss. The Kicking Horse is home to many varieties of freshwater fish, making fishing a viable activity.

== Major tributaries ==
- Sherbrooke Creek
- Yoho River
- Emerald River
- Amiskwi River
- Otterhead River
- Ottertail River
- Porcupine Creek
- Beaverfoot River
- Glenogle Creek

== See also ==
- List of tributaries of the Columbia River
- Divide Creek
- List of rivers of British Columbia
