= Field, British Columbia =

Field
- Unincorporated
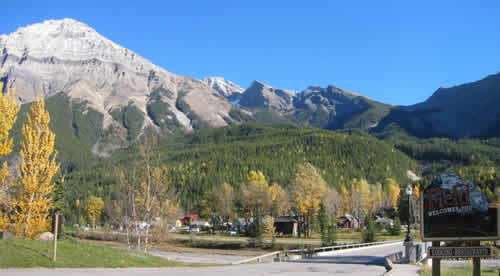
- Front entrance to the townsite

- Location of Field in British Columbia
- Coordinates: 51°23′45″N 116°29′20″W
- Country: Canada
- Province: British Columbia
- Regional district: Columbia-Shuswap
- Named after: Cyrus West Field

Population (2011)
  - Total: 195
- Time zone: UTC−7 (Mountain Standard Time (MST))
  - Summer (DST): UTC−6 (MDT)
- Postal code: V0A 1G0

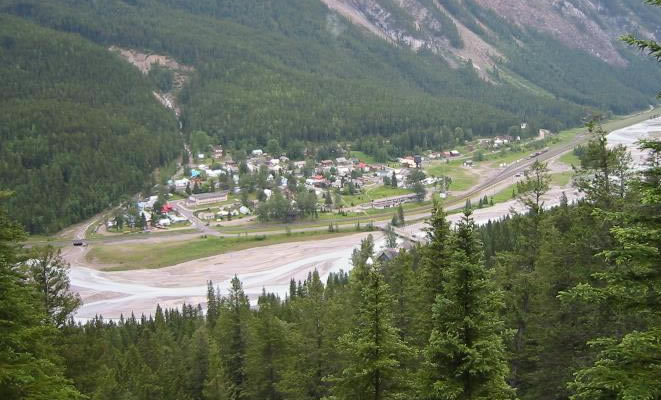
Field viewed from Mount Burgess

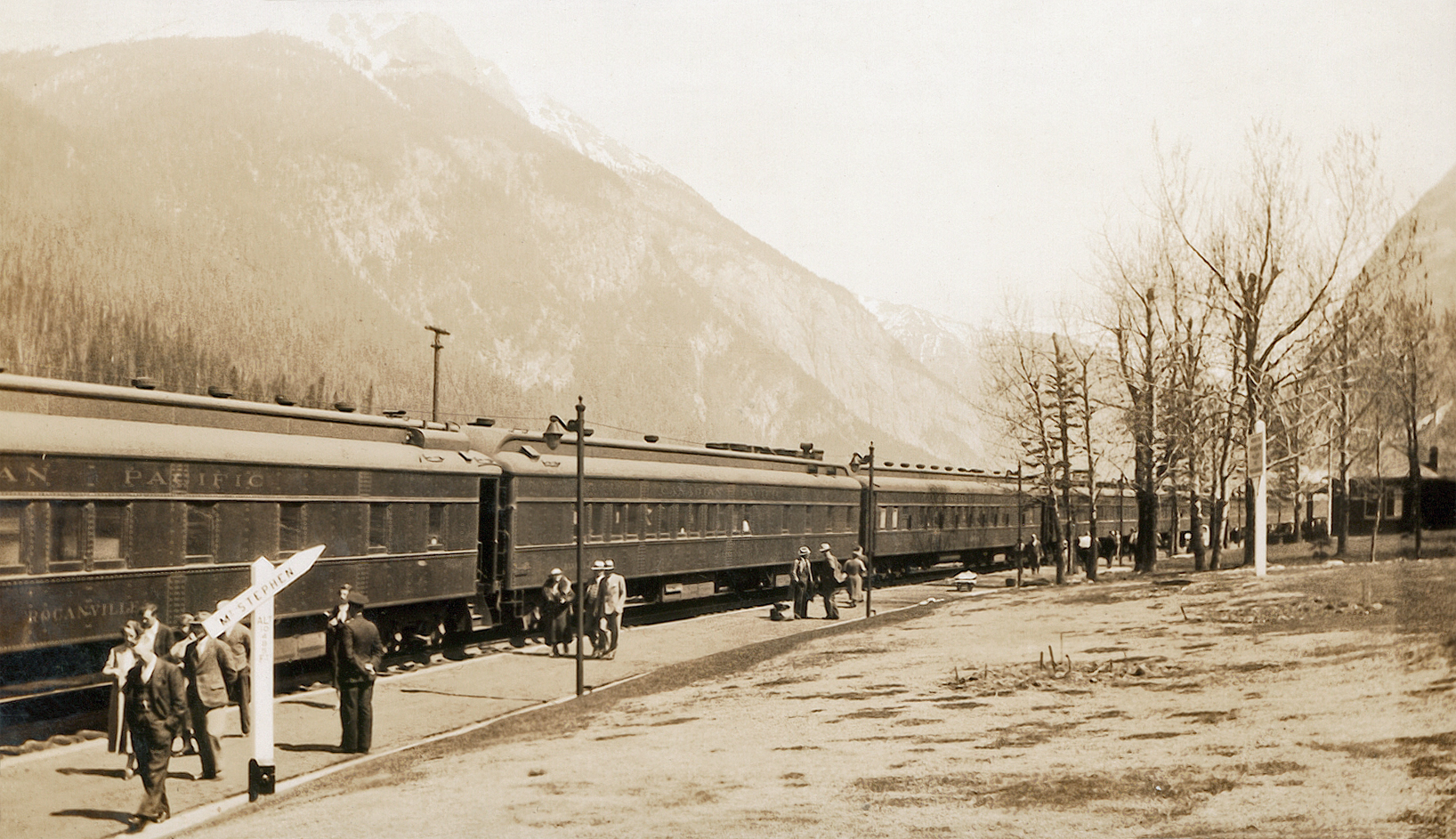
The train station in 1935

Field is an unincorporated community of approximately 169 people located in the Kicking Horse River valley of southeastern British Columbia, Canada, within the confines of Yoho National Park. At an elevation of 1,256 m (4,121 ft), it is 27 km (17 mi) west of Lake Louise along the Trans-Canada Highway, which provides the only road access to the town. The community is named for Cyrus West Field of Transatlantic telegraph cable fame, who visited the area in 1884.

== Demographics ==
In 2011, Field had a population of 195 year-round residents.

== Townsite administration ==
Field's land ownership was split between the Crown and the Canadian Pacific Railway (CPR), with the border between the two jurisdictions being Stephen Avenue. The railway was in charge of the water and electricity supply for the town until the 1950s, when the Canadian government took over. Today, the townsite is managed by Parks Canada. Local residents lease their land from the park administration, with a term of 42 years.

== Burgess Shale ==
CPR track workers in Field discovered the fossils of the Burgess Shale. Commonly called by the workers "the stone bugs", the first fossils were discovered on Mount Stephen. In 1909, Charles D. Walcott discovered the Walcott Quarry on the slope of Mount Field.
