= Wapta Lake =

Lake in British Columbia, Canada

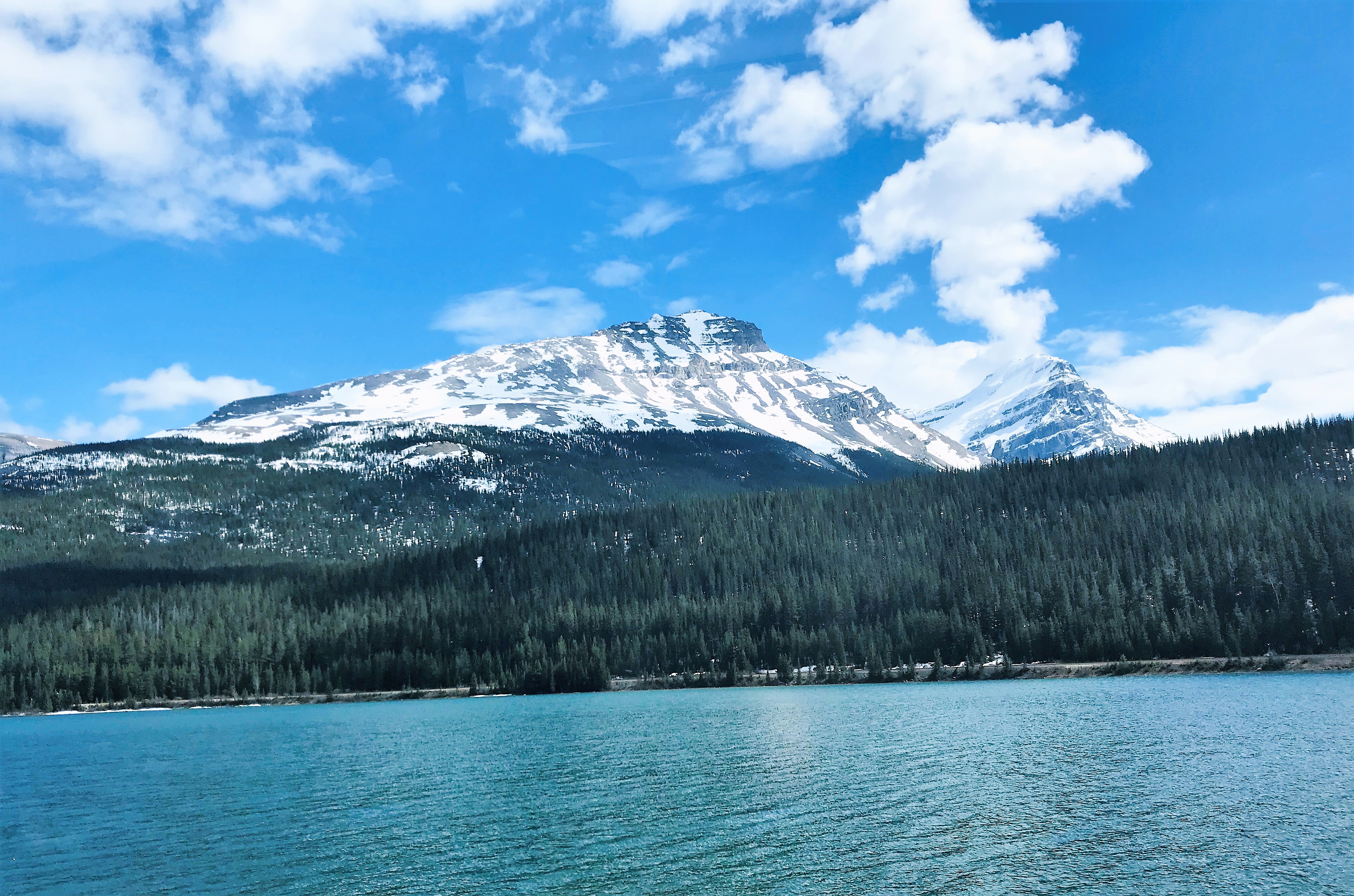
- Wapta Lake and Narao Peak

- Location within British Columbia
- Location: British Columbia
- Coordinates: 51°26′21″N 116°21′00″W
- Type: Glacial
- Primary inflows: Cataract Brook, Blue Creek
- Primary outflows: Kicking Horse River
- Basin countries: Canada
- Max. length: 740 m (2,430 ft)
- Max. width: 340 m (1,120 ft)
- Surface area: 0.2 km^{2} (0.077 sq mi)
- Max. depth: 9.2m (30 ft)
- Surface elevation: 1,600 m (5,200 ft)

Wapta Lake is a glacial lake in Yoho National Park in the Canadian Rockies of eastern British Columbia, Canada.

Wapta Lake is formed from Cataract Brook and Blue Creek in Yoho National Park, and is the source of the Kicking Horse River.

The Trans-Canada Highway passes on the north shore of the lake, while the Canadian Pacific Railway tracks follow the south shore.

== See also ==
- List of lakes in Yoho National Park
