= List of tunnels in Canada =

This list of tunnels in Canada includes any road, rail or waterway tunnel in Canada.

== Alberta ==
- 97 Avenue tunnel under Alberta Legislature grounds
- Alberta Legislature pedway system, Edmonton
- Airport Trail Tunnel, Calgary
- Juliet-Echo and Romeo Underpasses at Calgary International Airport
- Edmonton Radial Railway Society Tunnel (Old CPR rail tunnel under 109 Street)
- Various tunnel sections of the C-Train in Calgary
- Various tunnel sections of the Edmonton LRT

== British Columbia ==
Road tunnels:

- Cassiar Tunnel, Vancouver
- Elko Tunnel, near Fernie
- Fraser Canyon Tunnels
  - Saddle Rock Tunnel
  - Sailor Bar Tunnel
  - Hell's Gate
  - China Bar Tunnel
  - Yale Tunnel
  - Alexandra Tunnel
  - Ferrabee Tunnel
- George Massey Tunnel, Vancouver
- Iron Gates Tunnel, near Radium Hot Springs

Railway tunnels:

- Big Hill Spiral Tunnels
- Bulldog Tunnel, West Kootenay
- Connaught Tunnel, under Selkirk Mountains
- Dunsmuir Tunnel, Vancouver
- Esquimalt and Nanaimo Railway Tunnel, located between Langford and Malahat
- Lonsdale Tunnel, Vancouver
- Mount Macdonald Tunnel, near Rogers Pass
- Quintette Tunnels, near Hope
- Thornton Tunnel, Burnaby
- Wolverine Tunnel, Tumbler Ridge
- Table River Tunnel, Tumbler Ridge
- Various tunnel sections of the Canada Line
- Tunnel section of the Evergreen Extension between Burquitlam and Port Moody stations

== Manitoba ==
- Caddy Lake tunnels, Whiteshell Provincial Park
- Main Underground tunnels of the Winnipeg Walkway
- Tunnel network connecting various buildings at University of Manitoba (Fort Garry Campus)

== New Brunswick ==
- Blue Bell Tunnel, near New Denmark
- McAdam Pedestrian Tunnel

== Newfoundland & Labrador ==
- Brigus Tunnel
- MUNnels of Memorial University

== Nova Scotia ==
- Barrington Street–Marginal Road pedestrian tunnel, Halifax
- Downtown Halifax Link tunnels
- Evaristus and Assisi tunnels at Mount St. Vincent University
- Highway 102–Dunbrack Street exit tunnel, Halifax
- Tunnels of Georges Island

== Ontario ==
Road tunnels:

- Detroit-Windsor Tunnel, Windsor
- Cst. Robert C. Carrick and Sr. Cst. John Atkinson Memorial Tunnels, Windsor
- Highway 401–Hurontario Street Interchange tunnel, Mississauga
- Highway 404–401 Interchange tunnel, North York
- Infield Tunnel, Toronto Pearson International Airport
- Britannia Road East tunnels under taxiways F and T at Toronto Pearson International Airport
- Main Street Tunnel, Welland
- Simcoe Street Tunnel, Toronto
- Thorold Tunnel

Railway tunnels:

- Harbourfront LRT tunnel, Toronto
- Highway 401 and 409 Rail Tunnels, Etobicoke
- Hunter Street Tunnel, Hamilton
- Michigan Central Railway Tunnel, Windsor
- Mink Tunnel, Marathon
- Red Sucker Tunnel, Marathon
- St. Clair Tunnels, Sarnia
  - Old St. Clair Tunnel
  - Paul M. Tellier Tunnel
- Townline Tunnel, Welland
- Various tunnel sections of the O-Train in Ottawa
- Various tunnel sections of the TTC subway system

Pedestrian tunnels:

- Brockville Tunnel
- CFB Trenton tunnel under Old Highway 2, Trenton
- Fort Frontenac tunnel under Ontario Street, Kingston
- Pier A Tunnel to Gates B1-B5 at Terminal 3, Toronto Pearson International Airport
- Screaming Tunnel, Niagara Falls
- Under Carleton tunnel network, Carleton University
- Tunnels connecting various buildings at University of Waterloo
- Tunnels connecting various buildings at Western University
- Tunnels connecting various buildings at York University (Keele Campus)
- Tunnel between Stuart Street Garage (Queen's University) and Kingston General Hospital
- Tunnel under Bronson Avenue, Ottawa, between the Heron Road and Riverside Drive interchanges
- Tunnel connecting Vaughan Metropolitan Centre Station with SmartVMC Bus Terminal
- Tunnel connecting Spadina TTC stations
- Tunnel to Billy Bishop Toronto City Airport
- The PATH in Downtown Toronto

== Prince Edward Island ==
- Pedestrian tunnel between Confederation Court Mall and Confederation Centre of the Arts, Charlottetown

== Quebec ==
Road tunnels:

- Airport Tunnel, Montreal, under Montréal–Trudeau International Airport
- Atwater Tunnel, Montreal
- Joseph Samson Bridge–Tunnel, Quebec City
- Lachine Interchange tunnels, Montreal
- Louis Hippolyte Lafontaine Bridge–Tunnel, Montreal
- Melocheville Tunnel, Beauharnois
- Notre-Dame-de-Grâce Tunnel, Montreal
- Robert Bourassa Tunnel, Quebec City
- Rue St.-Marc and Rue du Fort tunnels, Montreal
- Saint-Rémi Tunnel, Montreal
- Saint-Nicolas Tunnel, near Franquelin
- Soulanges Canal Tunnel, Les Cèdres
- Ville-Marie and Viger Tunnels, Montreal

Railway tunnels:

- Charlevoix Train tunnels
  - Cap Rouge Tunnel, Sault-au-Cochon
  - Cap Martin Tunnel, Les Éboulements
- Cap de l'Enfer Tunnel, Port-Daniel–Gascons
- Mount Royal Tunnel, Montreal
- REM Airport Tunnel, Montreal
- Wolfe’s Cove Tunnel, Quebec City
- the Montreal Metro

Pedestrian tunnels:

- Underground passage from Fairmont Manoir Richelieu to Casino de Charlevoix
- Tunnel to Aeroquai (satellite domestic jetty) at Montréal–Trudeau International Airport
- Tunnels connecting various buildings at Laval University
- The Underground City (RÉSO)

Abandoned/closed tunnels:

- Dufferin–Champlain Tunnel, Quebec City
- Wellington Tunnel, Montreal

Longest Continuous Tunnels in Canada Without Passenger Stations (over 1,000 m)
Type	Name	Location	Length	Year	Comment
Path	Granduc Tunnel	Stewart British Columbia	17,000 m	1968	Former mining rail tunnel, currently empty
Hydro Electric	Kemano T1 and T2	Kemano British Columbia	16,000 m	1954; 2022	T1 was completed in 1954 and T2 was completed in May, 2022
Rail	Mount Macdonald Tunnel	Revelstoke British Columbia	14,660 m	1988	Mostly handles westbound trains
Hydro Electric	Niagara Tunnel Project	Niagara Falls Ontario	10,200 m	2013	-
Rail	Table River Tunnel	Tumbler Ridge British Columbia	9,600 m	1983	Used for coal transport
Rail	Connaught Tunnel	Revelstoke British Columbia	8,082 m	1916	Mostly handles eastbound trains
Rail	Wolverine Tunnel	Tumbler Ridge British Columbia	5,500 m	1983	Used for coal transport
Rail	Mount Royal Tunnel	Montreal Quebec	5,300 m	1918	Renovated and reopened in 2025
Hydro Electric	Mission Ridge Tunnels	Seton Portage British Columbia	4,000 m	1930	Twin tunnels
Rail	Thornton Tunnel	Burnaby British Columbia	3,200 m	1968	
Rail	SkyTrain Millennium Line Tunnel	Coquitlam and Port Moody British Columbia	2,000 m	2016	
Road	Ville-Marie and Viger Tunnels	Montreal Quebec	1,940 m	1972	
Rail	Mount Shaughnessy Tunnel	Rogers Pass British Columbia	1,830 m	1987	
Road	Detroit-Windsor Tunnel	Windsor Ontario	1,570 m	1930	International Tunnel to USA
Road	Louis-Hippolyte Lafontaine Bridge–Tunnel	Montreal Quebec	1,400 m	1967	
Rail	Dunsmuir Tunnel	Vancouver British Columbia	1,396 m	1932	
Rail	Shalalth Tunnel	Seton Portage British Columbia	1,200 m	1989	Tsal'alh Seton Train

== See also ==
- List of tunnels by location
