= Moffat Tunnel =

Rail and water tunnel in Colorado, USA

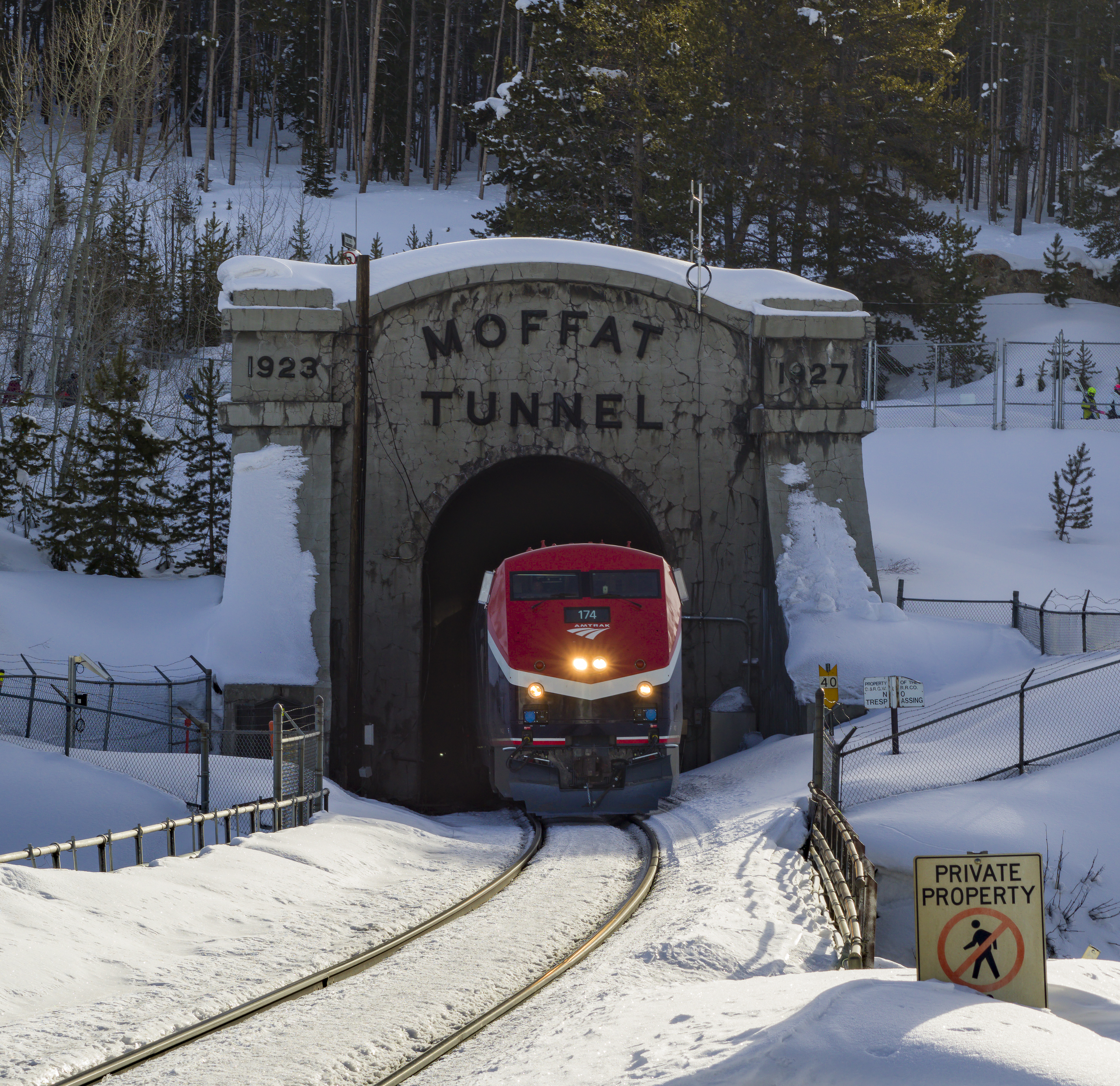
- An Amtrak train in the tunnel in 2024

Overview
- Location: Colorado, US
- System: Union Pacific Railroad
- Crosses: Continental Divide

Operation
- Opened: 26 February 1928
- Owner: State of Colorado
- Operator: Union Pacific

Technical
- Length: 6.2 miles (10.0 km)
- Track gauge: 4 ft 8 1/2 in (1,435 mm) standard gauge
- Max elevation: 9,239 feet (2,816 m) above sea level
- Tunnel clearance: 24 feet (7.3 m)
- Width: 18 feet (5.5 m)
- Grade: 1 in 125 (0.8%)

The Moffat Tunnel is a railroad and water tunnel that cuts through the Continental Divide in north-central Colorado. Named after Colorado railroad pioneer David Moffat, the tunnel's first official railroad traffic passed through in February 1928.

The Moffat Tunnel finally provided Denver with a western link through the Continental Divide, as both Cheyenne, Wyoming, to the north and Pueblo to the south already enjoyed rail access to the West Coast. It follows the right-of-way laid out by Moffat in 1902 while he was seeking a better and shorter route from Denver to Salt Lake City. The Moffat Tunnel averages 15 trains per day. The railroad and water tunnels parallel one another; the water tunnel delivers a portion of Denver's water supply. In 1979, the tunnel was designated as a National Historic Civil Engineering Landmark by the American Society of Civil Engineers.

== Overview ==
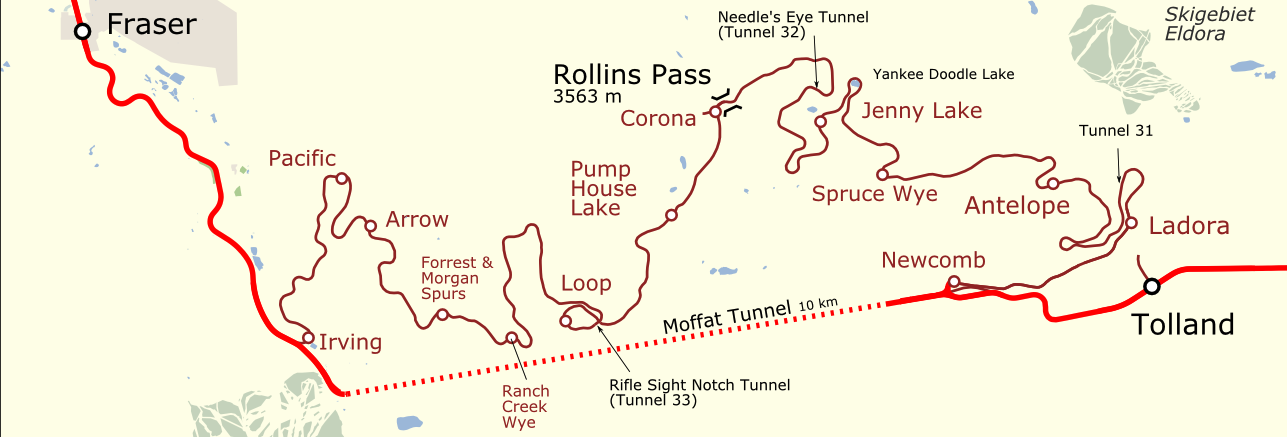
Moffat Tunnel/Rollins Pass

Moffat Tunnel is within Union Pacific's (UP) Central Corridor and is also used by BNSF under a trackage rights arrangement. The eastern portal is about 50 miles (80 km) west of Denver in the Front Range, about 10 miles (16 km) west of the town of Rollinsville. (Note: 39°54′08″N 105°38′46″W) The West Portal is located at the base area of Winter Park Resort, (Note: 39°53′15″N 105°45′41″W) above and east of the Dotsero Cutoff that leads west toward Salt Lake City. The tunnel is 24 feet (7.3 m) high, 18 feet (5.5 m) wide, and 6.2 miles (10.0 km) long. The apex of the tunnel is at 9,239 feet (2,816 m) above sea level. The tunnel has a gradient of 1 in 125 (0.8%).

As of 1989, the Moffat was the fourth-longest railroad tunnel in North America. It was the longest non-electrified tunnel until 1956, when electrification was removed from the Cascade Tunnel. The tunnel is single-tracked, so only one train is run through at a time, usually with eastbound and westbound trains alternating. For safety reasons, passengers are asked not to move from one car to another while the train is in the tunnel.

Moffat Tunnel is owned by the Colorado government. The railroad tunnel was originally leased to the Denver & Salt Lake Railway for a 50-year term, with an option to renew for an additional 49-year term. The use fee was $12,000 per year and was set to expire on January 6, 2025. In late 2024, Colorado and UP negotiated a new lease for the tunnel with a 25-year term, to be initiated on May 1, 2025. Provisions of the new lease forwent a monetary payment from UP in exchange for the right for the state to operate new passenger services over the line.

Although Moffat Tunnel's primary purpose is as a rail route for coal and freight, and as a water tunnel from the Pacific watershed to the Denver area, it also sees use by Amtrak's California Zephyr and Winter Park Express. The tunnel's apex elevation of 9,239 feet (2,816 m) is the highest point on the Amtrak network. Since August 15, 2021, the Rocky Mountaineer's Canyon Spirit tourist train has used the tunnel on its "Rockies to the Red Rocks" route between Salt Lake City and Denver, with a overnight stops in Moab and Glenwood Springs.

=== Ventilation system ===
The tunnel is ventilated by massive fans at East Portal operating after a train has exited the tunnel. The East Portal has doors which are shut before the fans are activated. Originally, trains would have to wait some 20–30 minutes before proceeding into the tunnel after the doors were re-opened. A sensor system is employed to evaluate the clearance of diesel exhaust, which can be less than 20 minutes for lighter trains.

== History ==
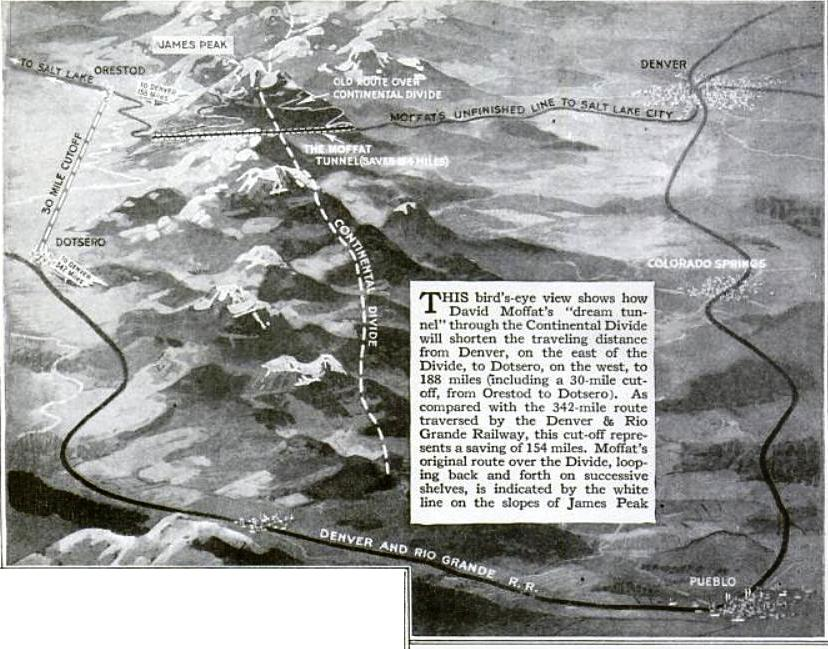
Benefits of construction of Moffat Tunnel as outlined in November 1922 issue of Popular Science magazine

The tunnel was conceived by David Moffat of the Denver, Northwestern, and Pacific (DNW&P) railroad as early as 1902. The original DNW&P tracks climbed Rollins Pass with a series of switchback loops with a steep 4% grade and severe snow conditions. Snow removal on the original line made it unprofitable to operate.

Moffat was unable to raise sufficient funds to build the tunnel before he died in 1911, but the forces behind the tunnel continued, and in 1914 a Denver bond issue was approved, financing two thirds of the construction cost of the tunnel. The issue was defeated in a court decision which ruled that Denver did not have the constitutional right to enter into a joint venture to construct the tunnel with a private corporation.

In 1920, a bill was introduced in the state legislature to build three tunnels under Monarch Pass, Cumbres Pass, and Rollins Pass (the Moffat Route). The various regions of the state could not come to agreement, partly because the southern and southwestern regions feared that Denver would gain a new advantage in commerce from the Moffat Route. Blocking this legislation would ultimately backfire when Denver was finally able to secure financing for its tunnel.

In early 1922, Denver's lawmakers in the state legislature found an opening. Pueblo had been devastated by a flood, and Gov. Oliver Henry Shoup called an emergency session of the legislature. Denver lawmakers now had power over Pueblo. They would vote for emergency funding for the beleaguered town (an economic rival to Denver) in return for legislation authorizing the issuance of bonds for Denver's tunnel. A deal was struck, and on April 29, the Moffat Tunnel Improvement District was created.

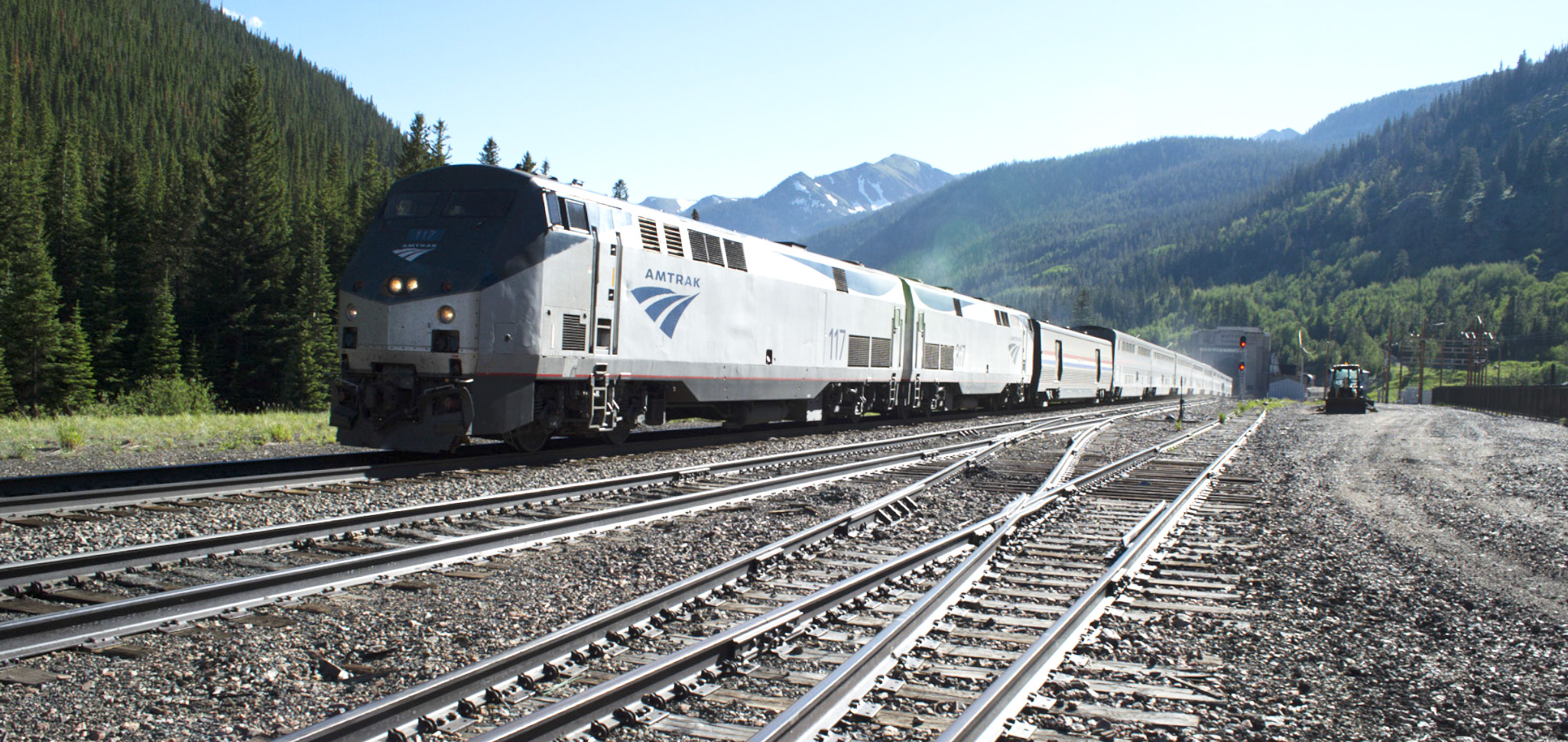
The eastbound California Zephyr emerging from the east portal

The district boundaries included the City and County of Denver and all or portions of the counties traversed by the Denver and Salt Lake Railway. The district had the authority to levy taxes and issue bonds backed by real estate within the district. The Colorado Supreme Court in November 1922 upheld the constitutionality of the law creating the district and its ability to issue bonds. The bonds were sold and construction began.

The bonds were fully paid off in December 1983, but the commission continued to exist until 1998. It was finally disbanded after a series of political intrigues related to Winter Park Resort, which was built partly on land owned by the commission (known as the Evans Tract).

In 1988, Rio Grande Industries, the company that controlled the Denver and Rio Grande Western Railroad, purchased the Southern Pacific Railroad. The combined company took the Southern Pacific name because of its name recognition among shippers. On September 11, 1996, owner Philip Anschutz sold the combined company to the Union Pacific Railroad in response to the earlier merger of the Burlington Northern and the Santa Fe which formed the Burlington Northern and Santa Fe Railway.

For many years, rail tunnel wastewater discharge, including coal dust and metal particles, has been a concern for Grand County and the Water Quality and Control Division of the Colorado Department of Public Health and Environment (CDPHE). In 2008, the tunnel discharged an average of 30,000 gallons of wastewater into the Fraser River daily. The railroad was forced to build a wastewater treatment plant in 2017. In late July 2023, for a day-and-a-half, the nearby UP wastewater treatment plant released "400,000 gallons of untreated groundwater and industrial wastewater" into the Fraser River.

== Construction ==
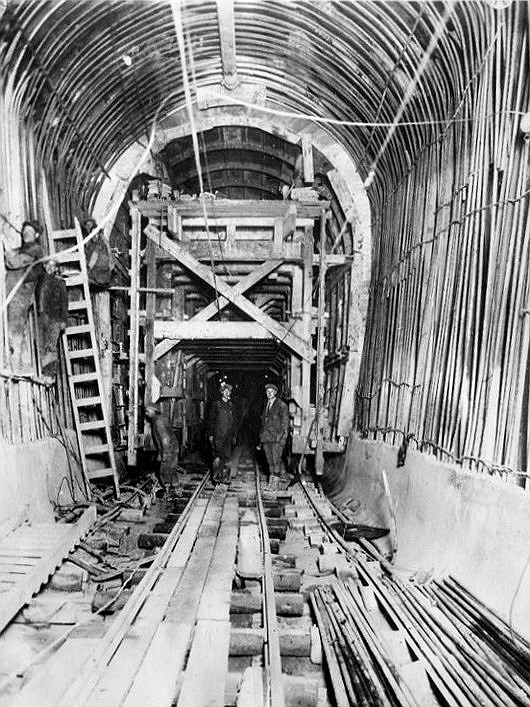
The nearly-completed tunnel in December 1927

The Moffat Tunnel was cut under a shoulder of James Peak. A small pilot tunnel was bored parallel with and 75 feet (23 m) south of the main tunnel to facilitate the work and was eight feet (2.4 m) high and eight feet (2.4 m) wide. In 1925, bad rock at the west end of the tunnel delayed construction, and costs soared. The pilot tunnel (pioneer bore) was officially "holed through" on February 18, 1927; the blast of dynamite was set off by President Calvin Coolidge pressing a key in Washington, D.C., and the program was broadcast by radio from the heart of the mountain. Three more bond issues were sold before the tunnel was completed.

The railroad tunnel was holed through on July 7, 1927, and formally turned over to the lessee on February 26, 1928. The 50th anniversary of its completion was commemorated on February 26, 1978; its centennial falls on February 26, 2028. Upon completion of the Dotsero Cutoff five years later, railroad connections through the tunnel shortened the distance between Denver and the Pacific coast by 176 miles (283 km). The tunnel took 48 months to bore; the average daily progress was 21 feet (6.4 m). The first train passed through the tunnel in February 1928.

Although the original cost of the tunnel was pegged at $6.62 million, final assessments collected by the Moffat Tunnel district, including interest, were $23,972,843. The cost of the two tunnels was $15.6 million, (Note: equivalent to $231 million in 2025) which is $475 per linear foot ($1,558 per linear meter). Each of the ornamental bronze characters on the east and west portals (entrances) of the tunnel cost $40 and a separate cast had to be made for each character. Further, on each portal are the dates: 1923 (when construction began) and 1927 (the year the tunnel was scheduled to be completed). By not changing 1927 to 1928 (the year the tunnel was actually finished and opened to rail traffic), this saved the commission $80 ($40 each portal) at the time (Note: equivalent to $1,500 for both in 2025). The project excavated 750,000 cubic yards (570,000 m^{3}), or 3,000,000,000 pounds (1,400,000 t) of rock, equal to 1,600 freight trains of 40 cars each.

Historical accounts have reported differing totals for deaths associated with the construction of the Moffat Tunnel, with 28 becoming one of the most frequently repeated figures. Preserve Rollins Pass, a public history and preservation initiative, has provisionally identified 55 people whose deaths were connected to the five-year construction period.

Track rails in the tunnel, originally jointed, were replaced in the 1930s with continuous welded rail, one of the earliest such installations in North America. This decision was prompted by the corrosive effect of coal smoke and steam condensate, captive within the tunnel, on the joints.

== Water tunnel ==
The pilot bore was leased to the City of Denver (Denver Water) for use as a water tunnel to divert water east from the Colorado River Basin under the Continental Divide to the urban areas of the eastern slope. The pilot bore was enlarged to a diameter of 10.5 feet (3.2 m), giving it a carrying capacity of 1,280 cubic feet per second (36 m^{3}/s), and water diversion began in 1936. In 1979, the water tunnel was sold by the Moffat Tunnel Improvement District to the city. Since the 1940s, the tunnel has also conveyed water for the city of Englewood.

Some of the water flowing through the Moffat Tunnel to Denver actually crosses the Continental Divide three times. This water originates in the city's Williams Fork collection system, from which it passes east across the Continental Divide through the Gumlick Tunnel under Jones Pass, into the basin of Clear Creek. This water then flows north across the Continental Divide through the Vasquez Tunnel into the valley of the Fraser River before reaching the Moffat Tunnel.

== East Portal Camp Cabins ==
On January 30, 2020, the five remaining East Portal Camp Cabins (located at the East Portal of the Moffat Tunnel adjacent to Rollins Pass) were classified by Colorado Preservation, Inc. as one of Colorado's Most Endangered Places. In the spring of 2023, the Gilpin County Historic Preservation Commission's Vice Chair, B. Travis Wright, nominated these cabins to become a Gilpin County local historic landmark. On June 13, 2023, the designation of the East Portal Camp Cabins was unanimously approved for local landmark designation, by a vote of 3–0.

== See also ==
- Alva B. Adams Tunnel, another tunnel that carries water across the Continental Divide in Colorado
- Connaught Tunnel, Mount Macdonald Tunnel, Big Hill Spiral Tunnels, and Mount Shaughnessy Tunnel, in Canada, traversing the Canadian Rockies
- Eisenhower Tunnel, equivalent tunnel for road traffic, built 50 years later
- Lists of tunnels
- The White Desert (1925)
