= Field Hill =

Coordinates: 51.43°N 116.40°W

Field Hill is a steep portion of the mainline of the Canadian Pacific Kansas City located near Field, British Columbia. Field was created solely to accommodate the Canadian Pacific Railway's need for additional locomotives to be added to trains about to tackle both Field Hill, and the Big Hill. Here a stone roundhouse with turntable was built at what was first known simply as Third Siding. In December 1884 the CPR renamed it Field after Cyrus W. Field, a Chicago businessman who had visited recently on a special train.

Difficult grades exist in both directions from Field, east through spiral tunnels 137 miles (220 km) to Calgary, Alberta; and 126 miles (203 km) west to Revelstoke, British Columbia, through Rogers Pass and the Connaught Tunnel, and where the modern Mount Macdonald Tunnel was opened in 1989.

Following completion of the Spiral Tunnels which eliminated the Big Hill, Field remained an important place as it was still necessary to add helper (bank) engines to get trains over the steep 2.2% (116 feet to the mile, or 22 metres to the kilometre) grade of Field Hill.

Even bigger locomotives were needed and this time six massive 0-6-6-0 Mallet type (see: Whyte notation) were built (one in 1909 and five in 1911). Five were compound engines, the last one a simple engine). These were of a unique design with both pairs of cylinders together at the middle of the boiler. The design was not repeated and eventually these engines were rebuilt (1916–17) into 2-10-0s.

More powerful still were the fourteen 2-10-2s built (1919–20) for work on the mountain. These were followed in 1929 by the most powerful steam locomotives in the British Empire, twenty 2-10-4 Selkirks. A further ten were built in 1938 and a final six in 1949, the last one being 5935, the last steam locomotive built for the CPR.

Diesel-electric locomotives followed, and over the decades bigger and more powerful diesels replaced smaller ones just as was the case with the steam locomotives that had preceded them.

Even though the Spiral Tunnels eliminated the Big Hill, the mountains remained and so too did the Field Hill. The Ottertail revision of 1902 and the five-mile (26,518 feet or 8.083 kilometres) long double track Connaught Tunnel of 1916 were other improvements made to the original line in British Columbia. It was not until the late 20th century when a major new project of 20 miles (32 km) including the 9.1-mile (14.6 km) Mount Macdonald Tunnel reduced the grade to a very manageable average of 0.82%, (maximum 1%) opened in December 1988.
