= Palliser =

Palliser may refer to:

== People ==
- Anthony Palliser (born 1949), British painter
- Arthur Palliser (1890–1956), British Royal Navy admiral
- Charles Palliser (born 1947), American-born, British-based novelist
- Charles Palliser, brother of the founder of Palliser, Palliser & Company and a partner in the firm
- George Palliser (born around 1849), founder of Palliser, Palliser & Company
- George Palliser (1919–2011), British Royal Air Force fighter pilot
- Henry Palliser (1839–1907), British Royal Navy admiral
- Hugh Palliser (1723–1796), British Royal Navy admiral and governor of Newfoundland
- John Palliser (1817–1887), Irish explorer who surveyed the Canadian west
- Michael Palliser (1922–2012), former senior British diplomat
- Richard Palliser (born 1981), British chess player
- Úna Palliser, Irish-born musician
- William Palliser (1830–1882), Irish-born politician and inventor, Member of Parliament

== Places ==
=== Canada ===
- Palliser (Alberta electoral district)
- Palliser (Saskatchewan electoral district)
- Palliser, British Columbia, an old townsite
- Palliser, Calgary, a neighbourhood in Calgary, Alberta
- Palliser Formation, a geologic formation in the Rockies
- Palliser Pass, a mountain pass in the Rockies
- Palliser Range, a mountain range of the Canadian Rockies
- Palliser Regional Park, Saskatchewan
- Palliser River, British Columbia
- Palliser Campus of the Saskatchewan Institute of Applied Science and Technology, Moose Jaw
- Palliser's Triangle, a geographic region in southern Alberta and Saskatchewan

=== Oceania ===
- Cape Palliser, a promontory on the southern coast of New Zealand's North Island
- Palliser Bay, a bay near Cape Palliser, New Zealand
- Palliser Islands, in the Tuamotu Archipelago, French Polynesia

== Military ==
- Operation Palliser, a 2000 British military operation in Sierra Leone
- HMS Palliser (F94), a British Royal Navy anti-submarine frigate
- Palliser shot and shell, British artillery projectiles

== Other uses ==
- Fairmont Palliser Hotel, Calgary, Alberta
- Palliser baronets, a title in the baronetage of Great Britain
- Palliser expedition (1857–1860), a survey expedition in the Canadian west led by John Palliser
- Palliser Furniture, a Canadian furniture manufacturer
- Palliser Health Region, governing body for healthcare regulation in Alberta
- Palliser novels, by Anthony Trollope, many of which involve the Palliser family
  - Plantagenet Palliser, a lead character in several of Trollope's novels
- The Pallisers, a television adaptation of Trollope's novels
