= Canadian Pacific Selkirk =

36 steam locomotives built for Canadian Pacific Railway

Canadian Pacific Selkirk locomotives
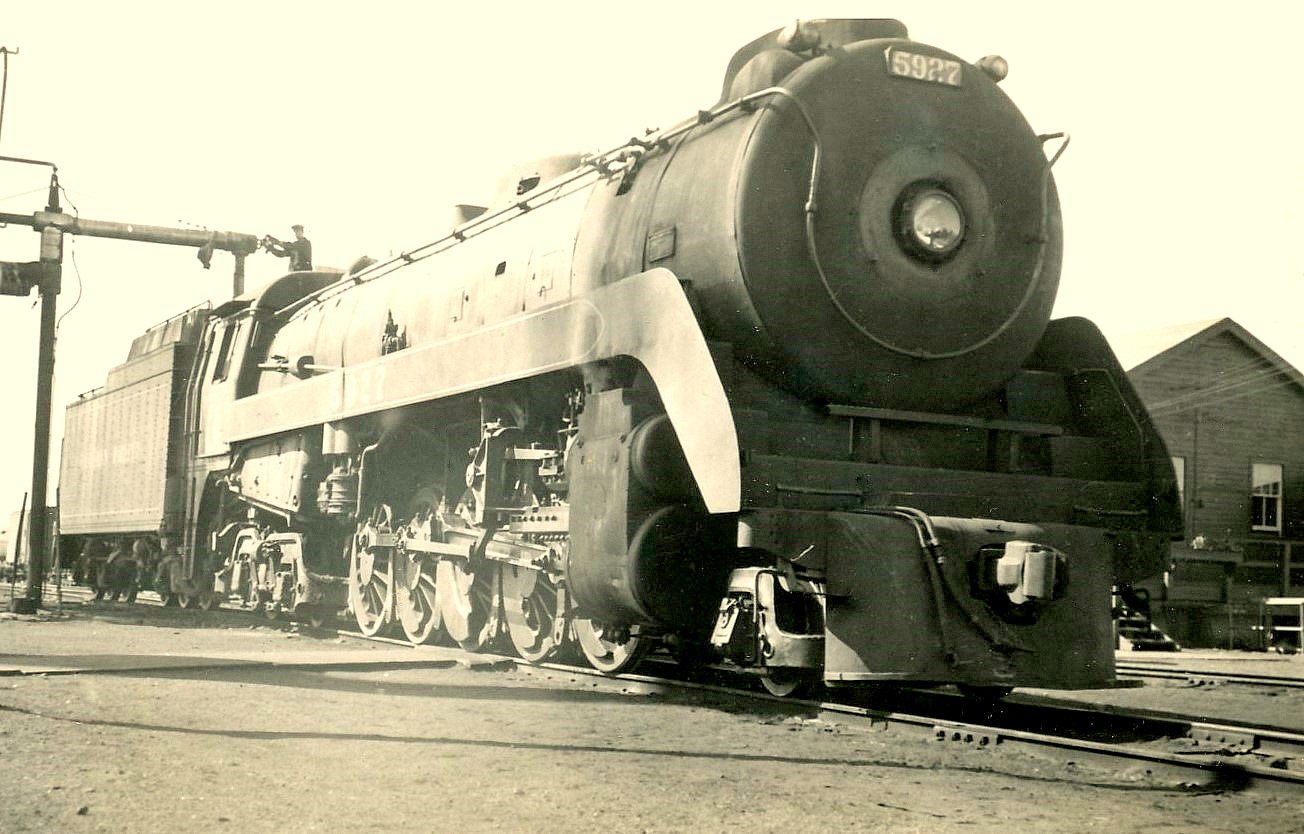
- Canadian Pacific T1b class No. 5927 takes on oil at the South Edmonton shops in the summer of 1957
Type and origin
- Power type: Steam
- Builder: Montreal Locomotive Works
- Order number: Q-415 (T1c)
- Serial number: 67921–67940 (T1a); 69110–69119 (T1b); 76221–76226 (T1c)
- Build date: 1929 (20); 1938 (10); 1949 (6)
- Total produced: 36
Specifications
- Configuration
  - Whyte: 2-10-4
  - UIC: 1′E2′h2G
- Gauge: 4 ft 8 1/2 in (1,435 mm) standard gauge
- Driver dia.: 63 in (1.600 m)
- Adhesive weight: 310,000 lb (140 t) (T1a/T1b); 312,000 lb (142 t) (T1c)
- Loco weight: 453,000 lb (205 t) (T1a); 447,000 lb (203 t) (T1b); 449,000 lb (204 t) (T1c)
- Boiler pressure: 275 lbf/in^{2} (1.90 MPa) (T1a); 285 lbf/in^{2} (1.97 MPa) (T1b/T1c)
- Cylinders: Two, outside
- Cylinder size: 25 1/2 in × 32 in (648 mm × 813 mm) (T1a); 25 in × 32 in (635 mm × 813 mm) (T1b/T1c)
Performance figures
- Tractive effort: 78,000 lbf (350 kN)
Career
- Operators: Canadian Pacific Railway
- Class: T1a (20), T1b (10), T1c (6)
- Numbers: 5900–5919 (T1a); 5920–5929 (T1b); 5930–5935 (T1c)
- Locale: Western Canada
- Retired: 1950 (20),1955-1959 (16)
- Preserved: Two, 5935 and 5931
- Disposition: Two preserved, remainder scrapped.

The Selkirk locomotives are steam locomotives of the 2-10-4 wheel arrangement built between 1929 and 1949 for Canadian Pacific Railway by Montreal Locomotive Works in Quebec, Canada. Originally numbering 36, the locomotives were retired by 1959, and only two are preserved, both non-operational.

== History ==
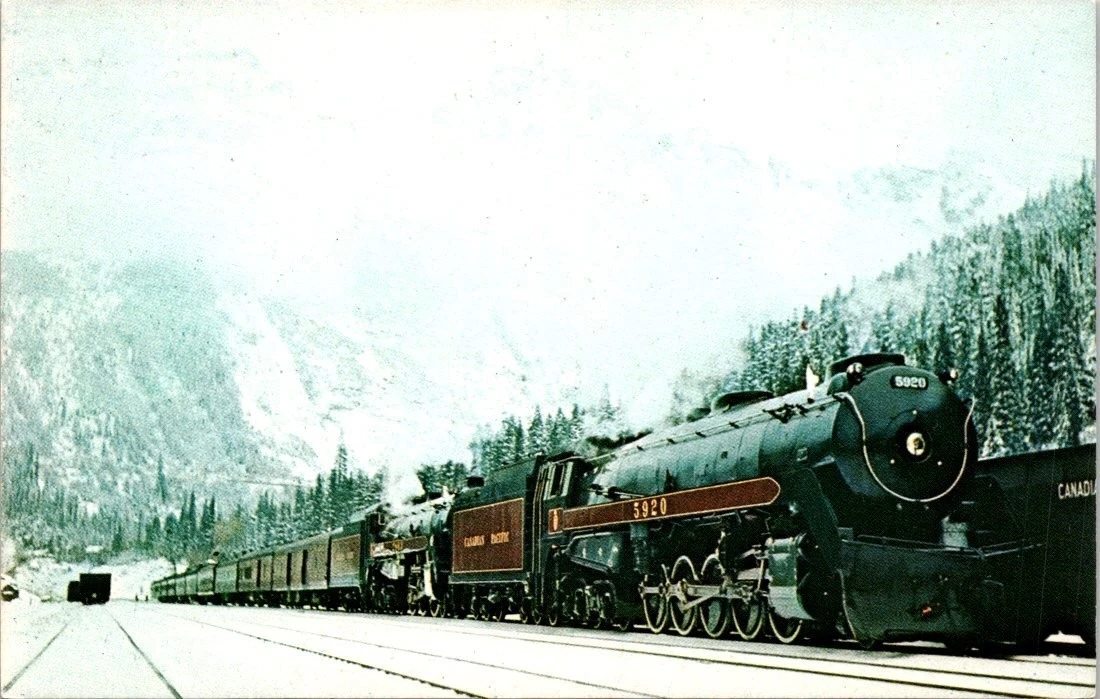
Selkirk No. 5920, assisted by No. 2863, hauling the 1951 royal train, carrying Princess Elizabeth and Prince Philip through Glacier, British Columbia, in October 1951

The first of these large engines, which had a 2-10-4 wheel arrangement, was built in July 1929. Altogether, twenty were constructed before the end of this year bearing numbers 5900 to 5919. The Canadian Pacific Railway's classification was T1a. These locomotives weighed 375 short tons (340 t) fully loaded. They were the largest and most powerful locomotives in the British Empire. While most other 2-10-4s were named after the state of Texas, these locomotives were named after the Selkirk range of mountains that they crossed, the (railway) summit of which was located just inside the western portal of the Connaught Tunnel beneath Rogers Pass.

Montreal Locomotive Works built another ten of these successful Selkirk locomotives during November and December 1938. The Canadian Pacific Railway assigned them T1b class. They were numbered from 5920 to 5929. Modifications led the T1b to be ten tons lighter while increasing steam pressure from 275 to 285 pounds per square inch (1.90 to 1.97 MPa). A further six Selkirks, classed T1c, were built by the Montreal Locomotive Works shop in 1949. They were the last standard-gauge steam locomotives built in Canada for a Canadian railway. They were much the same as the T1b except for a few refinements, including two cross-compound air compressors to speed recharging of the air brake system.

Some small streamlining touches were not retained. The streamlined casing around the smokebox stack was now absent as was the teardrop shape of the classification lights. Also, the inside of the cabs were no longer lined/insulated in the same manner as the previous classes (previous classes had provided better cold-weather cab insulation and were more popular with engine crews). They were all equipped with boosters (some shortly after being built) and all Selkirks (5900 through 5935) were built as oil burners. The tenders held 12,000 imperial gallons (55,000 L; 14,000 US gal) of water and 4,100 imperial gallons (19,000 L; 4,900 US gal) of fuel oil. They had to be equipped with two pairs of six-wheel trucks because the total tender weight was 148 short tons (132 long tons; 134 t).

The first Selkirks, which come from the T1a class, had a heavier-looking, non-streamlined appearance which better exemplified the heavy steam-power look. Their original, as-delivered rear sand domes were removed early in their service life. All of the later T1b and T1c-class locomotives were semi-streamlined and were painted with CPR Tuscan red panels along the sides of their running boards, beneath the cab windows and on the sides of the tenders with gold leaf (originally) border trim (which was later changed to a type of yellow similar to "duluxe gold"). Some of the original T1a-class Selkirks also received this paint scheme (but with narrower panels along the sides of the running boards that widened in the middle to carry the locomotive's road number).

All 36 Selkirk locomotives (5900 through 5935) were initially assigned to handle both freight and passenger trains between the major division points of Calgary and Revelstoke, a distance of 262 miles (422 km). They were also used for 23 miles (37 km) in pusher service from Revelstoke west (uphill) to the wye at Taft, assisting the road engines of both freight as well as passenger trains up the steep grade to this location. The Laggan Subdivision covered the eastern portion of their assigned territory 137 miles (220 km) and included the Field Hill and the Spiral Tunnels while the western portion of their primary, assigned territory consisted of the Mountain Subdivision which covered the remaining 126 miles (203 km) and included Rogers Pass, the Connaught Tunnel and Stoney Creek Bridge. The grades encountered had a maximum of 2.2% (1 in 45), with curves of 12° or 480 feet (150 m) radius. Rated at 78,000 pounds-force (350 kN) tractive effort, on the lesser grades they could haul 1,050 short tons (940 long tons; 950 t) unassisted and without the booster cut-in. The booster engine added an additional 12,000 lbf (53 kN) of tractive effort up to a maximum speed of 20 mph (32 km/h). Due to their extreme weight, they could not proceed west of Taft to Vancouver.

When diesels began operation between Calgary and Revelstoke in the early 1950s, the Selkirks were reassigned to work the Brooks and Maple Creek subdivisions between Calgary and Swift Current, Saskatchewan. They were also used to haul freight trains north of their new Alyth terminal (in Calgary) as far as Edmonton. At least some of the reassigned Selkirks received an "all black" (non-passenger) paint scheme without CPR Tuscan red panels and without grey or "blued" metal boiler-jackets; however, they still retained the yellow panel trim around the previous CPR Tuscan red (now black) panels (on those locomotives formerly painted with "outlined" panels). The last Selkirks (5930 through 5935) were taken out of service in 1959.

== Preservation ==
All but two Selkirk locomotives class were scrapped, and both surviving classes are from the T1c class. None of the earlier T1a class or T1b class locomotives was preserved. 5935 is preserved in the Canadian Railway Museum, in Saint-Constant, Quebec. 5931 (which was repainted and intentionally renumbered incorrectly as 5934 upon initial public display near downtown Calgary) is displayed at Heritage Park in Calgary, Alberta.

Preserved Selkirk locomotives
Type	Number	Image	Date built	Serial number	Location	Coordinates	Notes
T1c	5931		February 1949	76222	Heritage Park, Calgary, Alberta	50.98025°N 114.09538°W	On static display at Mewata Park, Calgary between 1959 and 1981, mistakenly numbered No. 5934. Currently exhibited outdoors at Heritage Park Historical Village.
T1c	5935		March 1949	76226	Canadian Railway Museum, Saint-Constant, Quebec	45.37527°N 73.56385°W	On static display inside.
