= Stoney Creek Bridge =

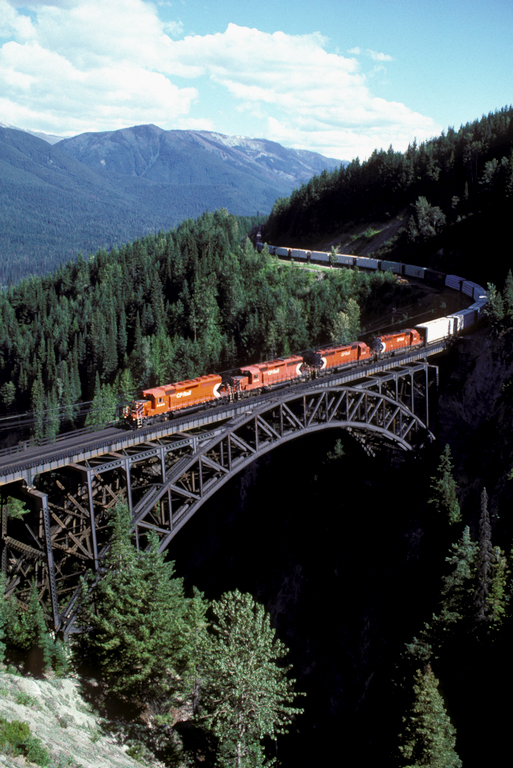
- CP freight train, Stoney Creek Bridge, 1988
- Coordinates: 51°22′46.60″N 117°27′55.58″W
- Carries: railway
- Crosses: Stoney Creek
- Locale: Rogers Pass
- Owner: Canadian Pacific Kansas City

Characteristics
- Design: truss arch bridge
- Material: Wrought iron
- Total length: 148 metres (486 ft)
- Height: 82 metres (270 ft)
- Longest span: 102 metres (336 ft)

History
- Designer: Hamilton Bridge Co. (1893), Canadian Bridge Co. (1929)
- Opened: 1894
- Replaces: 1885 bridge

Location
- Interactive map of Stoney Creek Bridge

Stoney Creek Bridge is a Canadian Pacific Kansas City (CPKC) truss arch in southeastern British Columbia. This single-track crossing over Stoney Creek is in Glacier National Park, between Revelstoke and Golden. The first bridge in this location was constructed of wood by the Canadian Pacific Railway (CP) and opened in 1885. It was replaced by a steel bridge in 1894.

== 1885 wooden bridge ==
Stoney Creek was the highest timber bridge ever built, and at the time was the second highest bridge in North America with reference to deck height, rather than structural height. Deck height is the maximum vertical drop from the bridge deck to the ground or water surface below. However, various sources yield a range of height measurements for this wooden structure.

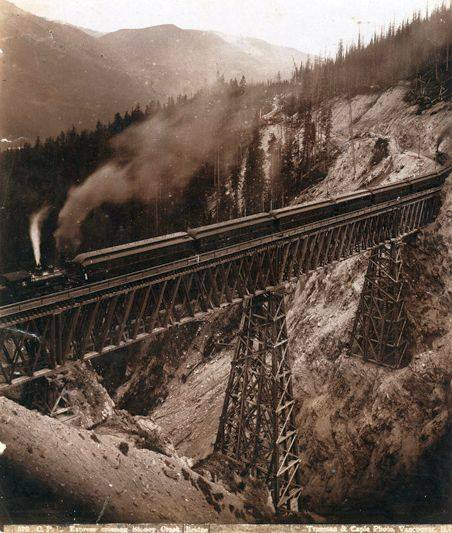
CP passenger train, former Stoney Creek Bridge, c.1890.

The heights of the three towers were 33 metres (109 ft), 60 metres (196 ft), and 10 metres (34 ft). Recalculating the measurement using the planning and photographic evidence indicates an 84-metre (275 ft) deck height. Howe trusses, measuring 52 metres (172 ft) and 49 metres (161.5 ft), spanned the three piers.

The confined workspace of the narrow gulch and the unstable rock foundation slowed construction. A flash flood, which buried the foundations of the high tower, cost two days of work. After a forest fire consumed 14 cars of lumber for the bridge, loggers had to fell additional trees to replace the loss. Completed in early August 1885, construction took seven weeks, which included ten days lost owing to the death of two workers and wet weather. Although each of the very high bridges on the east slope of the Selkirk Mountains had been construction challenges, this final one proved the most problematic.

No other railway has ever matched CP in building as many high timber bridges as were required to initially conquer the mountainous terrain of eastern British Columbia.

== 1894 steel bridge ==
=== Construction ===
In 1893, 3,000 carloads of rock were railed from a Salmon Arm quarry. During construction, a carpenter struck by dislodged rock was fatally injured on falling to the bottom of the ravine. A Hamilton Bridge Co. employee fell to his death later that year. This company replaced the existing crossing with an 82-metre-high (270 ft), 148-metre-long (486 ft) structure, incorporating a 102-metre (336 ft) steel arch span. After load testing, work was suspended until the spring 1894 completion and opening. The design could comfortably support the combined weight of two mountain region locomotives.

=== Strengthening ===
To handle heavier locomotives, CP proposed to replace the structure with a new 95-metre (311 ft) cantilever deck truss with 34-metre (111 ft) flanking anchor spans, built adjacent to the existing bridge. However, the unsuitable rock foundation of the canyon made the idea uneconomical. Instead, truss arches, positioned outside of the existing ones, would widen each side by 1.5 metres (5 ft).

In 1929, the Canadian Bridge Co. undertook the installation, and replaced the deck lattice girder spans with deck plate girders. The design could support four locomotives with a combined weight of 1,100 tons. In 1970, the load capacity was re-evaluated for the introduction of bulk commodity unit trains. In 1999, another strength evaluation was conducted. The western approach comprises a sharp bend in the track to cross the gorge at its narrowest point. This track curvature places considerably greater centrifugal forces on the west end of the structure, which limits current train speeds to 40 kilometres per hour (25 mph).

Since the opening of the lower Macdonald Track in 1988 for westbound traffic, the Stoney Creek arch on the Connaught Track has primarily handled the lighter eastbound trains. Although fatigue damage during the prior 15 years was considerable, the bridge maintains an expected long life. However, to safely sustain present and future train loads, some deficient parts may require strengthening.

=== Accident ===
In 2015, six cars of a westbound freight derailed on the bridge. The train had diverted to the eastbound route because the Mount Macdonald Tunnel was being vented. The incident occurred when the train lost momentum on the steeper grade and stopped with the cars on the bridge. However, restarting on the curve caused the heavier cars at the front and rear of the train to lift the lighter middle cars from the track.

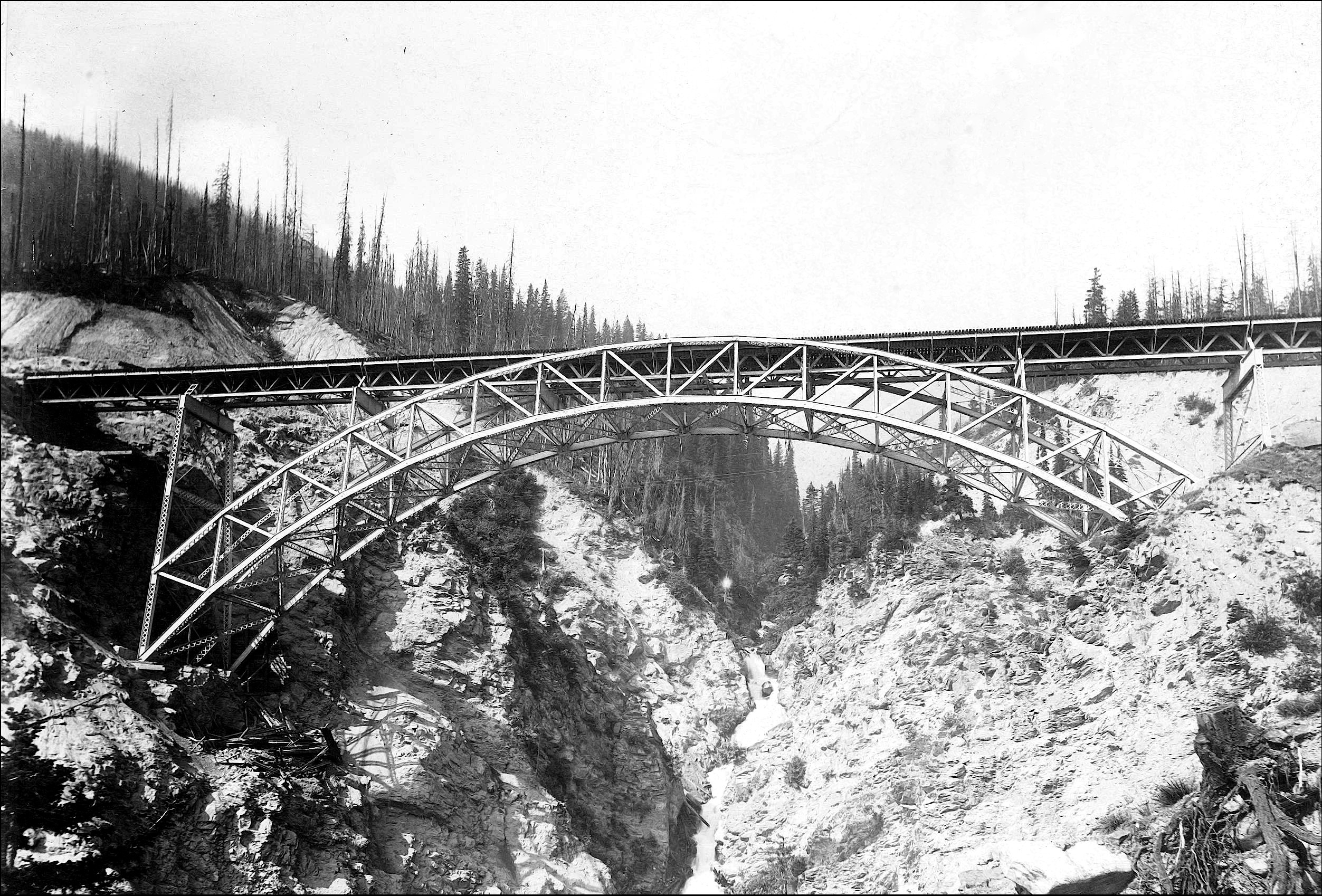
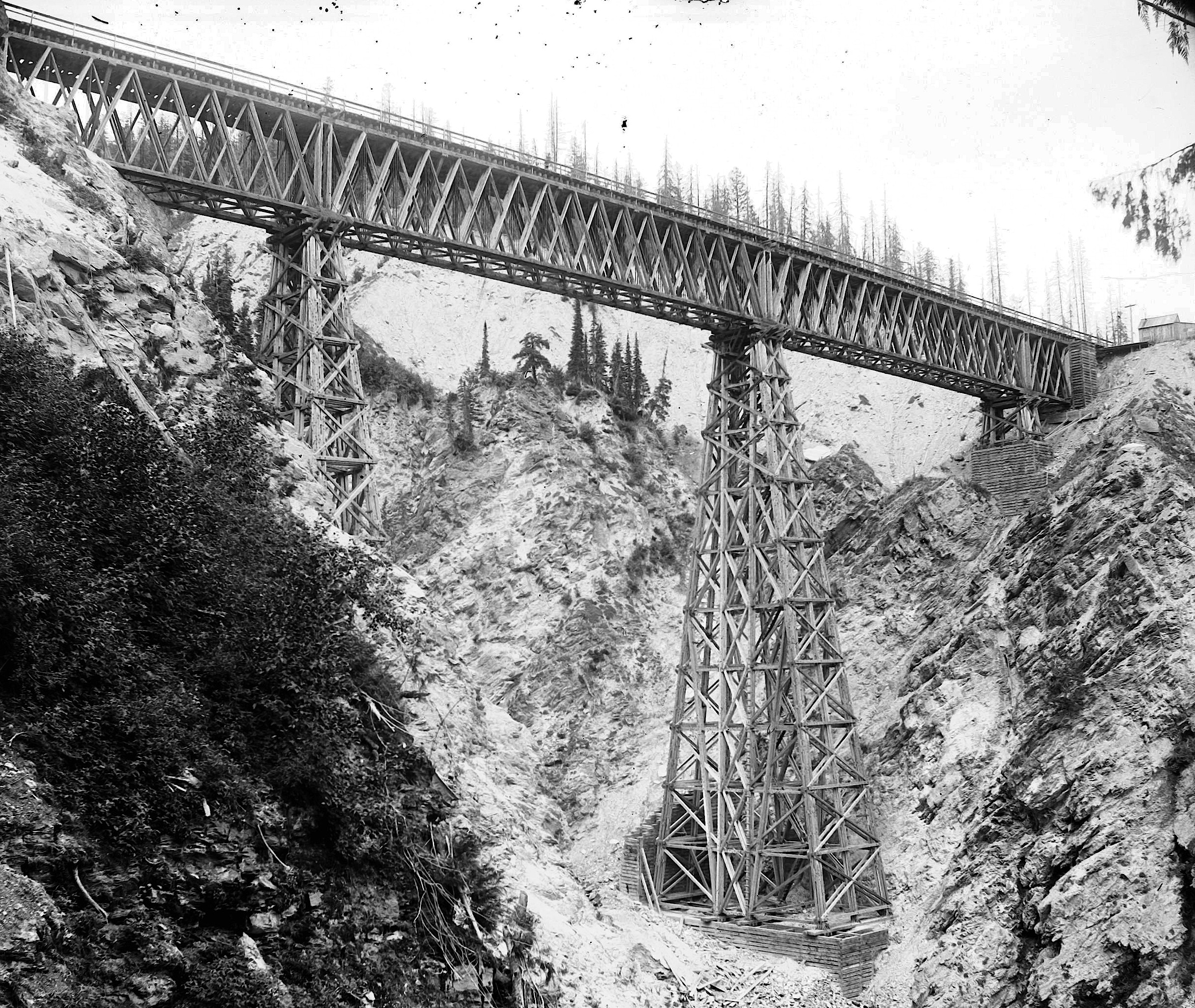
1894 steel bridge, c.1894, ┼ 1885 wooden bridge, c.1890

=== Notability ===
When opened, the 1894 bridge ranked seventh in height:

1. Garabit Viaduct (1885) 124 metres (407 ft)
2. Loa Viaduct (1888) 102 metres (336 ft)
3. Pecos River High Bridge (1892) 98 metres (321 ft)
4. Malleco Viaduct (1890) 96 metres (315 ft)
5. Kinzua Viaduct (1882) 92 metres (301 ft)
6. Young's High Bridge (1889) 86 metres (283 ft)
7. Stoney Creek Bridge (1894) 82 metres (270 ft)

Although no longer world rating, the crossing ranks second to Lethbridge Viaduct (1909) 96 metres (314 ft) in Western Canada.

The bridge and its locale have been the subject of numerous CP promotional photographs that have gained iconic status. Among the most recognized are those by CP special photographer Nicholas Morant featuring The Canadian when it was the railway's flagship streamliner. In the mid-1980s, several television commercials to promote the railway were filmed at the bridge site.

== Siding ==
Stoney Creek is a 2,582-metre (8,471 ft) siding at Mile 77.7, Mountain Subdivision. Adjacent to the west is Glacier (Mile 85.5), and east is Griffith (Mile 71.7). The bridge (Mile 76.2) is immediately northwest in an overall eastward direction.

== 1988 bridge ==
Downstream, and about 150 metres (500 ft) below the Connaught Track bridge, is the seven-span 210-metre-long (700 ft) Macdonald Track bridge. Completed in fall 1986, the spans for the John Fox viaduct were unloaded at the south end of this bridge from early July 1987. On December 12, 1988, the first revenue train, hauling coal, passed over the bridge, and reduced an hour of the journey.
