= Moffat Tunnel Improvement District =

The Moffat Tunnel Improvement District was an independent entity of the State of Colorado (USA) created to build and manage the Moffat Tunnel, a railroad and water tunnel under James Peak and Rollins Pass.

The district had the authority to sell bonds backed by real estate taxes in the counties served by the Denver and Salt Lake Railway, which was the original railroad tenant of the tunnel.

The district was originally governed by a five-member elected commission and existed from 1922 until 1998.

== Controversy and dissolution of the commission ==
The bonds for the tunnel were retired in December 1983. However, the district continued to collect taxes for another year, resulting in a fund of excess cash of approximately $1 million.

In 1990, a group of activist commissioners were elected who proceeded to use the resources at their disposal to sue the Winter Park Resort, the Colorado Arlberg Club and the City and County of Denver in order to represent the public interest against perceived abuses by powerful private interests. In 1991 and 1992 the commission delayed a lease to the Southern Pacific Railroad for using the railroad tunnel for fiber optic cables. The commission began to agitate to recover money from Winter Park Resort to pay for land leased from the commission, known as the Evans Tract. By 1994, the commission was demanding rents and threatened to evict the ski resort and build a "Taco Bell". Eventually, the resort agreed to purchase the land for $2 million (in 1996).

Because of these challenges, the railroad and the ski area join forces in 1996 to push forward a bill in the state legislature to dissolve the commission. The legislature passed the act in 1997. The bill specified that new commissioners would be named by the Governor (Roy Romer) to handle the liquidation of the commission and the transfer of assets to the state. Before this process was set in motion, the existing commissioners defiantly threatened to vote the commission out of existence at their final meeting before the new commission would be seated. However, the motion ultimately failed to pass, perhaps because the commissioners feared being sued over the action.

In January 1998, the newly seated commissioners sold the water tunnel to the Denver Water Board for $7 million and put the railroad tunnel up for sale. There were no offers, though. The railroad had the right of first refusal and to match any offer. Moreover, it had a lease lasting until 2025 that had little monetary value to the owner of the tunnel. The remaining assets of the commission were transferred to the state and the commission ceased to exist in early 1998.
