= John Fox (railway engineer) =

Canadian civil engineer

John Fox CM
- Born: 1924
- Died: 2001 (aged 76–77)
- Education: McGill University
- Occupation: Civil engineer

John Fox, CM (1924 – 2001) was a Canadian civil engineer. He oversaw the Mount Macdonald Tunnel project at Rogers Pass in the Canadian Rockies, the crowning achievement of a 40-year career at Canadian Pacific Railway. The innovative 1.2 km John Fox Viaduct, just to the east of the Mount Shaughnessy Tunnel eastern portal is named after him.

== Early life ==
Son of James Fox who came from England and operated a store in Huntingdon, Quebec, John Fox attended Huntingdon Academy and later joined the Royal Canadian Air Force as a pilot in World War II. After the war, he studied Civil Engineering at McGill University and married the former Janet Fraser of Dundee, Quebec in 1949, the same year that he joined the CPR.

== Legacy ==
John Fox was appointed to the Order of Canada on October 25, 1990, with the following citation: "Vice-President of Engineering and Special Projects at Canadian Pacific Rail, he was responsible for introducing innovative and environmentally-sensitive engineering techniques in the construction of the Roger's Pass Project, the single most important railway project since the building of the main line. His leadership and professionalism have facilitated the enhancement of the safety and efficiency of Canada's railway system".
