= Jones Pass =

Mountain pass in Colorado, USA

- Interactive map of Jones Pass
- Elevation: 12,454 ft (3,796 m)
- Traversed by: unimproved road

Third Approach
- Location: Clear Creek / Grand counties, Colorado, U.S.
- Range: Front Range
- Coordinates: 39°46′25″N 105°53′21″W
- Topo map: USGS Byers Peak

Jones Pass, elevation 12,454 ft (3,796 m), is a mountain pass that crosses the Continental Divide in the Front Range of the Rocky Mountains of Colorado in the United States.

The Gumlick Tunnel is a water tunnel under Jones Pass for water diversion from the upper Williams Fork east under the continental divide into the valley of Clear Creek (Colorado). The water is not discharged into Clear Creek, but is sent north through the Vasquez Tunnel which passes back under the continental divide. The water is eventually delivered to the City of Denver via the Moffat Tunnel. The 2.9 miles (4.7 km) Gumlick Tunnel was completed in 1940 and significantly improved in 1957–58. The tunnel is horseshoe-shaped, 7 feet (2.1 m) high, and can carry water at 550 cubic feet per second (16 m^{3}/s).

== See also ==
- Southern Rocky Mountains
  - Front Range
- Colorado mountain passes
