= Stadium–Chinatown station =

Metro Vancouver SkyTrain station

Stadium–Chinatown 體育館／華埠（唐人街）
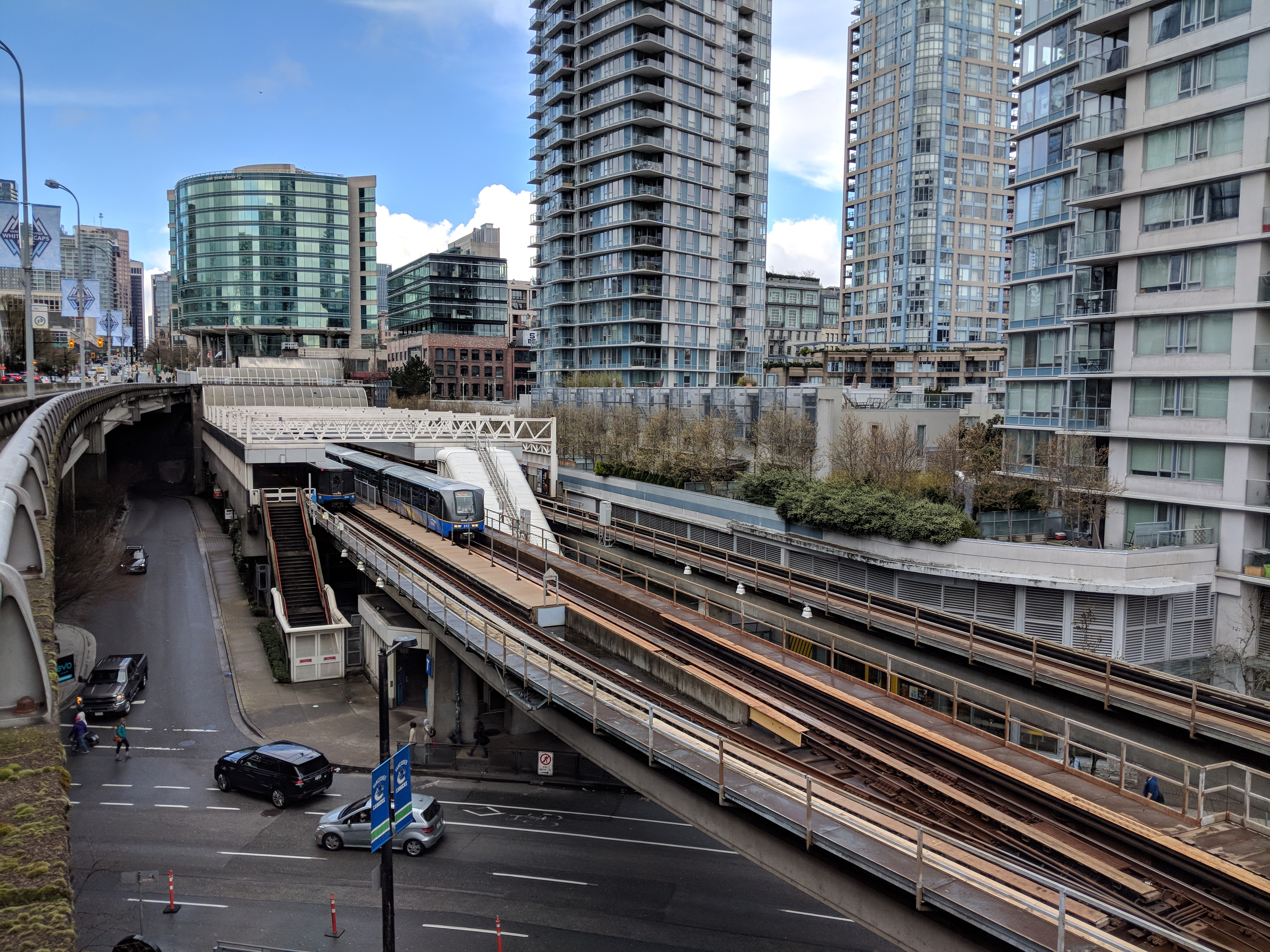
- Track and platform configuration at the station (left to right): Spare platform, outbound platform, inbound platform

General information
- Location: 590 Beatty Street, Vancouver
- Coordinates: 49°16′46″N 123°6′34″W
- System: SkyTrain station
- Owner: TransLink
- Platforms: Centre platform Side platform (spare)
- Tracks: 3

Construction
- Structure type: Elevated
- Accessible: yes
- Architect: Architektengruppe U-Bahn

Other information
- Station code: ST
- Fare zone: 1

History
- Opened: December 11, 1985; 40 years ago
- Former names: Stadium (1985–2004)

Passengers
- 2025: 4,803,000 ▼2.6%
- Rank: 9 of 54

Services
Preceding station	TransLink	Following station
Granville towards Waterfront	Expo Line	Main Street–Science World towards King George or Production Way–University
Location

Stadium–Chinatown (formerly Stadium) is an elevated station on the Expo Line of Metro Vancouver's SkyTrain rapid transit system. The station is located in Vancouver, British Columbia, Canada, at the eastern entrance of the Dunsmuir Tunnel. It is one of four stations on the Expo Line that serve Downtown Vancouver.

As its name suggests, the station is located near BC Place Stadium and Vancouver's Chinatown. TransLink's lost property office is located at the station.

== History ==
Opened as Stadium in 1985 as part of the original SkyTrain system (now known as the Expo Line), the station was designed by Austrian architecture firm Architektengruppe U-Bahn. It was named for BC Place Stadium. Both the station and stadium were vital to the Expo 86 world's fair held in Vancouver. The "Chinatown" portion of the station's name was added in 2004, because local merchants and politicians wished to promote the historical and cultural significance of Vancouver's Chinatown district, located just one block away from the station.

During Expo 86, the station served as a transfer point between the main site of the fair and the Canadian Pavilion (now Canada Place) located on Burrard Inlet at Waterfront station. Transferring between these two stations was free for fair attendees during the fair using special shuttle trains, which ran from a third platform at Stadium station (where there was a connection to the monorail serving the main Expo 86 site) to the Canadian Pavilion at Waterfront station. An automated announcement was aired during the shuttle ride explaining how the SkyTrain and its automated driverless technology operated. The third platform and track were taken out of revenue use once Expo 86 ended and are rarely used except in cases of extreme crowds from hockey games and concerts held at BC Place Stadium. The third platform and track are primarily used for training purposes, train storage, special event service, and rerouting during rail replacement.

The station was originally constructed with a passageway under Beatty Street to the west in anticipation of future development. When the Amec Building, built across Beatty Street, did not link to the underground passage, the passage was closed. The passage has been occupied by TransLink's lost property office since 1991. The staircase on the west side of Beatty was filled with sand and topped with a concrete sidewalk so that the passage could be reopened in the future.

Until 1988, the Expo Boulevard / Abbott Street entrance was an open-stair emergency exit. However, with the closing of the entrance tunnel under Beatty Street as well as poor accessibility to Stadium station from False Creek, the emergency exit was redesigned and enclosed, opening in 1989 as the second access point to and from the station. TransLink's Compass customer service centre was located at the station from its inception until September 2022, when it was relocated to Waterfront station.

== Services ==
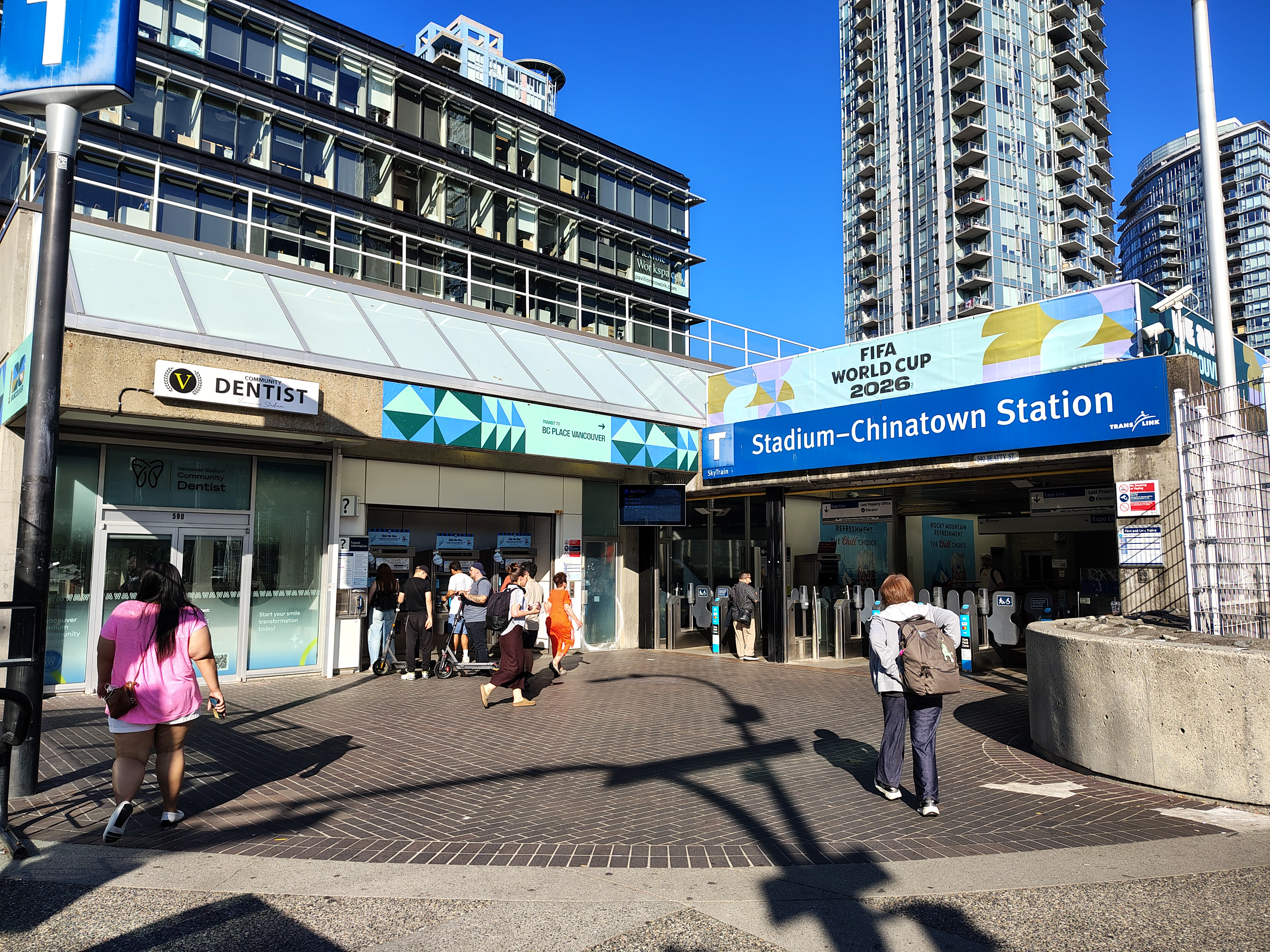
The Beatty Street entrance is often used by people attending events at BC Place.

Important destinations near the station include Rogers Arena and BC Place Stadium, where home games of the Vancouver Canucks, BC Lions, and Vancouver Whitecaps FC are played and other major events are held. Following an event at BC Place or Rogers Arena, the passenger volumes are large enough that it is desirable to post TransLink personnel to collect and check fares at this station, in contrast to the proof-of-payment system that was in force prior to the roll out of the Compass card. The Queen Elizabeth Theatre, as well as the downtown location of Vancouver Community College, are located a few blocks from the station.

Vancouver's Chinatown is located northeast of the intersection of Taylor and Keefer. The International Village shopping centre (colloquially called "Tinseltown" after the movie theatre on the third floor) and the Chinatown location of T & T Supermarket are located near the station at the intersection of Abbott and Keefer.

== Station information ==
=== Entrances ===
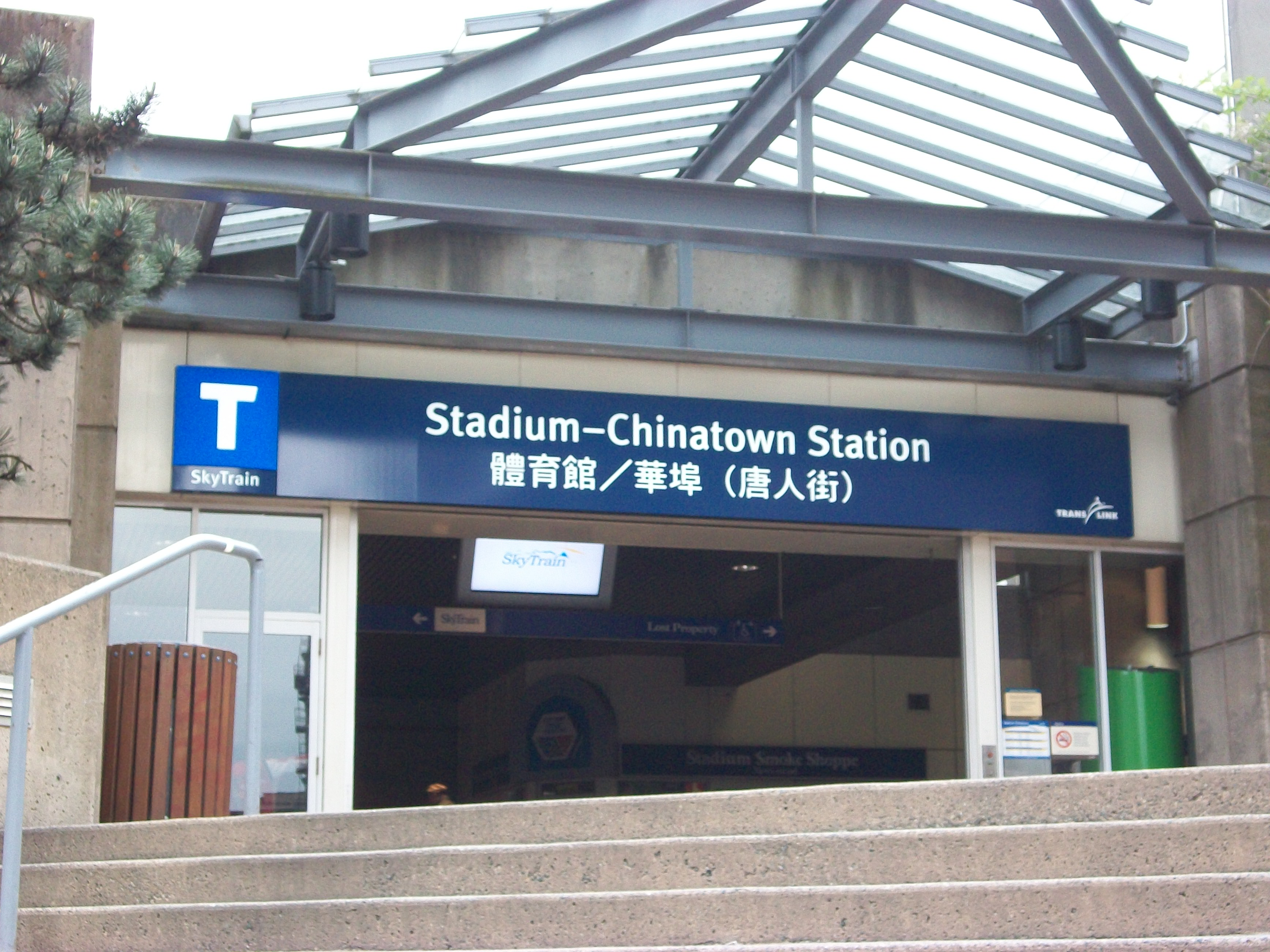
The sign at the Keefer Place entrance displays the station's name in English and traditional Chinese.

- The Beatty Street entrance is a fully accessible entrance at the west end of the platforms, serving BC Place Stadium and the downtown area. An elevator connects the upper street, concourse, train, and restricted levels.
- The Keefer Place entrance is located on the concourse level shared with the Beatty entrance, beside the Lost Property Office. It is the closest entrance serving the Chinatown area. The entrance's signage is labelled in English and traditional Chinese characters. The sign reads "Stadium–Chinatown Station 體育館／華埠（唐人街）". Stadium–Chinatown the only station on the system to be officially labelled in a language other than English.
- The Expo Boulevard entrance is located at the east end of the platforms, serving Rogers Arena. No elevator and escalator access is available from this entrance; however, wheelchair access to the platform can be made using the elevators of a nearby residential development via a circuitous routing. There is no access to platform 3.

=== Transit connections ===
- Local and suburban bus stops are located near the intersection of Hamilton Street and Dunsmuir Street, two blocks west from the Beatty Street entrance:
  - 5 Robson
  - 6 Davie
  - 17 Oak
  - 240 Lynn Valley
  - 241 Upper Lonsdale (peak only)
  - 246 Highland
  - 247 Upper Capilano (peak only)
  - 257 Horseshoe Bay (express)
  - N15 Cambie Night Bus
  - N24 Lynn Valley Night Bus
- In addition, local community shuttles serving the north False Creek area operate on Expo Boulevard and Abbott Street, on the east side of the station near the Expo Boulevard entrance:
  - 23 English Bay
  - 23 Main Street Station
