= Dunsmuir Tunnel =

Subway in Vancouver, BC

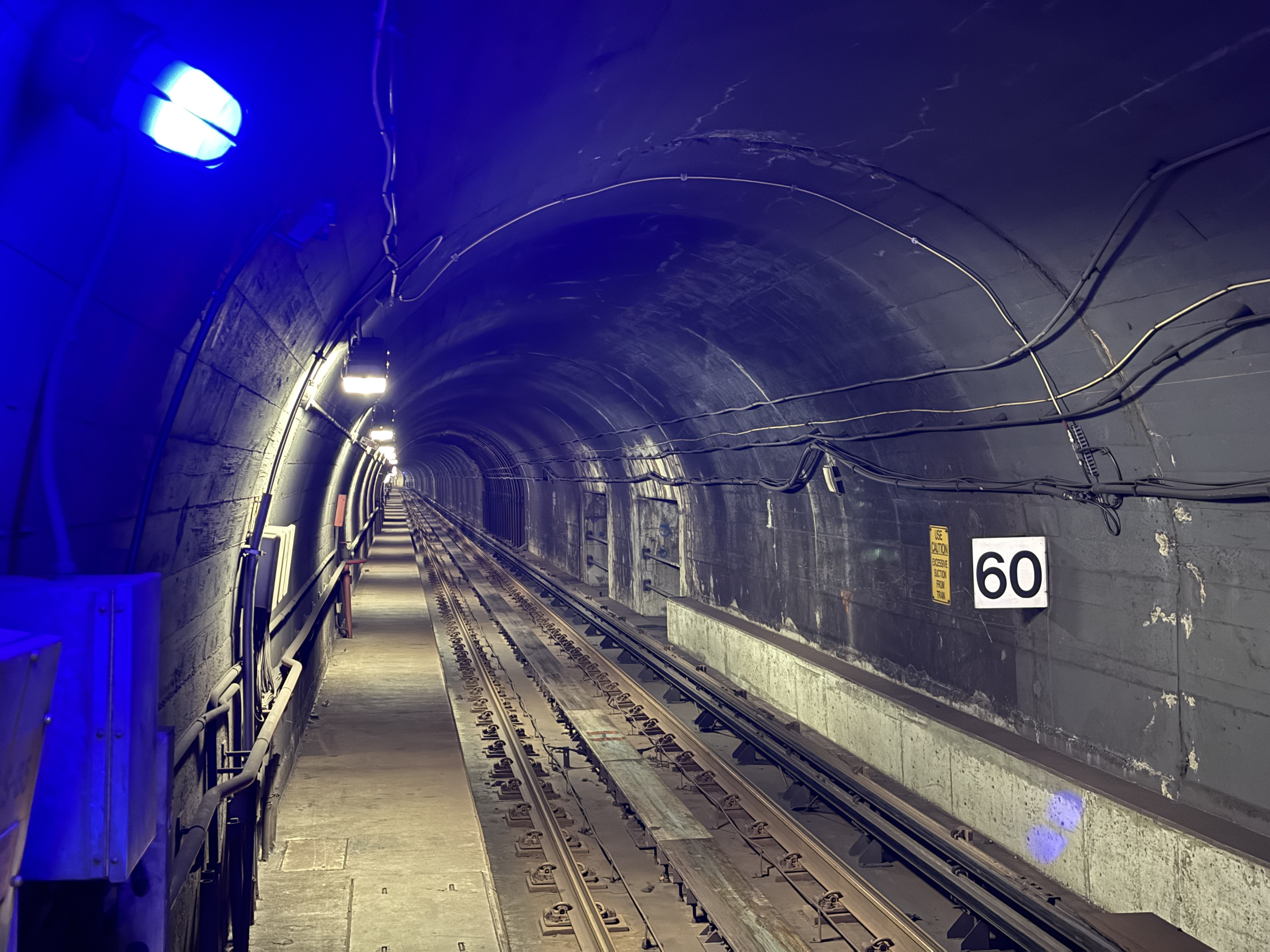
- Dunsmuir Tunnel in Granville station
- Interactive map of Dunsmuir Tunnel

Overview
- Location: Vancouver, British Columbia
- Coordinates: 49.282981°N 123.115420°W
- Start: Waterfront
- End: Stadium–Chinatown
- No. of stations: 2

Operation
- Work began: 1931
- Opened: July 17, 1932
- Reopened: December 11, 1985
- Owner: TransLink
- Traffic: Automated guideway transit

Technical
- Length: 1,396 metres (4,580 ft)
- No. of tracks: 2
- Electrified: Third rail

The Dunsmuir Tunnel is a subway tunnel below Dunsmuir Street in Vancouver, British Columbia, Canada. The tunnel is used by the Expo Line of Metro Vancouver's SkyTrain rapid transit system. It is located downtown and has Burrard and Granville stations built within the tunnel. The western tunnel portal is located midway between Waterfront and Burrard stations, while the eastern portal is adjacent to Stadium–Chinatown station.

== History ==
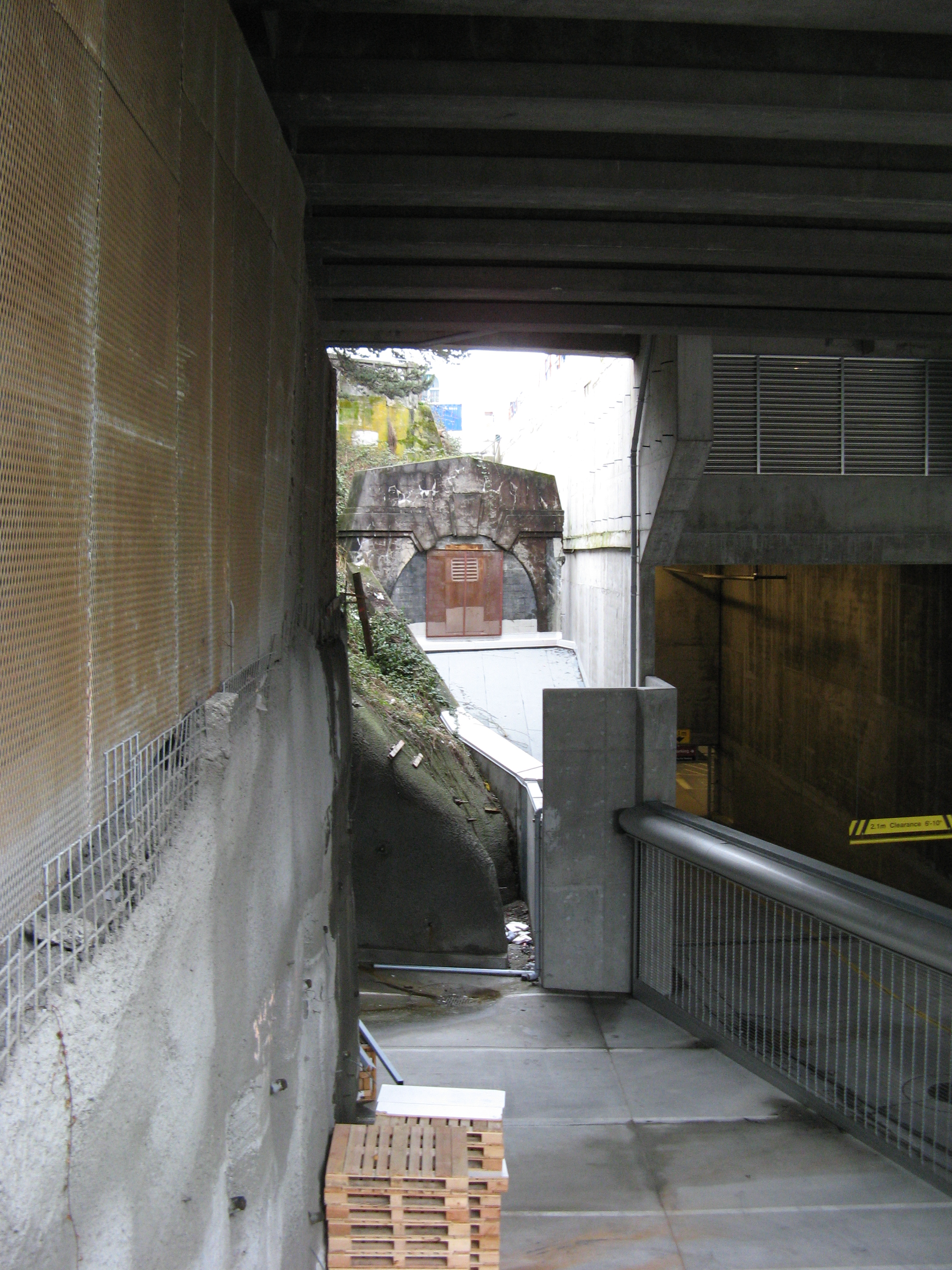
The former eastern portal used by the Canadian Pacific Railway

The tunnel was originally built by the Northern Construction Company to connect the Canadian Pacific Railway railyards on Burrard Inlet and False Creek at a cost of $1.6 million. It opened on July 17, 1932, and was built to a height of 8.8 metres (29 ft) and a depth of 6 to 24 m (20 to 79 ft) below street level. The tunnel's original east portal was located further south than the current portal, easing trains into the False Creek yards on a gentle southward curve. It was clearly visible until about 2005, where it was almost completely hidden next to an outdoor storage area behind Costco. The original portal was destroyed in 2011 to make way for a new development, but there remains an abandoned section of tunnel, unused by SkyTrain.

The tunnel was taken over by BC Transit in the early 1980s when the SkyTrain system was built in conjunction with Expo 86. Because the tunnel is only wide enough to accommodate a single railway track but has sufficiently high clearance, a superstructure was built inside the tunnel to carry the westbound SkyTrain track above the eastbound track. This results in the two stations within the tunnel having a split platform configuration.

== See also ==
- List of tunnels in Canada
