= Red Sucker tunnel =

- Interactive map of Red Sucker tunnel

Overview
- Location: Thunder Bay District, Ontario, Canada
- Coordinates: 48°46′17″N 86°29′23″W
- System: Canadian Pacific Railway

Operation
- Opened: 1884

Technical
- No. of tracks: single
- Track gauge: 1,435 mm (4 ft 8 1/2 in)
- Max elevation: 213 m (699 ft)
- Min elevation: 213 m

Red Sucker Tunnel is a railway tunnel in geographic McCoy Township in the town of Marathon, Thunder Bay District in northwestern Ontario, Canada. It is located on the north shore of Lake Superior at Red Sucker Cove, and was constructed in 1884 for the Canadian Pacific Railway (CPR) by contractor Kenneth McLeod.
