= Joseph-Samson Bridge–Tunnel =

Tunnel in Quebec City, Quebec, Canada

Joseph Samson Bridge–Tunnel
- Interactive map of Joseph Samson Bridge–Tunnel

Overview
- Location: Quebec City, Quebec, Canada
- Coordinates: 46°49′10″N 71°12′55″W
- Crosses: Saint-Charles River, Gare du Palais, and Jean Lesage Building

Technical
- Length: 280 metres

The Joseph Samson Bridge–Tunnel (French: Pont-Tunnel Joseph-Samson) is a vehicular bridge–tunnel in the Quebec City borough of La Cité-Limoilou..

It connects Capucin Boulevard in Old Limoilou with the old Port of Quebec.

The bridge-tunnel first crosses over the Saint-Charles River at the north and then runs southeast, passing under the Gare du Palais train station and SAAQ headquarters (Jean Lesage Building). The bridge carries six lanes of traffic (two reversible), a bike lane on the west side, and sidewalks on both sides, while the tunnel is limited to three lanes of vehicular traffic (including one reversible lane).

The tunnel was constructed in the 1980s by Ministry of Transportation of Quebec and named after former Quebec City mayor Joseph-Octave Samson
