= Lonsdale Tunnel =

Railway tunnel in Vancouver, Canada

Coordinates: 49.3118°N 123.0828°W

The Lonsdale Tunnel is a 1,640 ft (500 m) freight railway tunnel in North Vancouver, British Columbia, running under Lonsdale Avenue and parallel to Esplanade Ave between St. Georges and Chesterfield Ave.

It was built by the Vancouver Harbour and Wharves Commission, from 1928 on, to separate industrial freight from traffic and street cars on Lonsdale Ave and connect the Pacific Great Eastern Railway to the new Second Narrows Bridge.
