= Wolfe's Cove Tunnel =

Rail tunnel in Quebec

Wolfe's Cove Tunnel (French: Tunnel de l'Anse au Foulon, Tunnel sous la colline de Québec) is a railway tunnel located in Quebec City, Quebec, Canada. It is the only significant railway tunnel in the city, connecting the Saint-Sauveur district to the Port of Quebec.

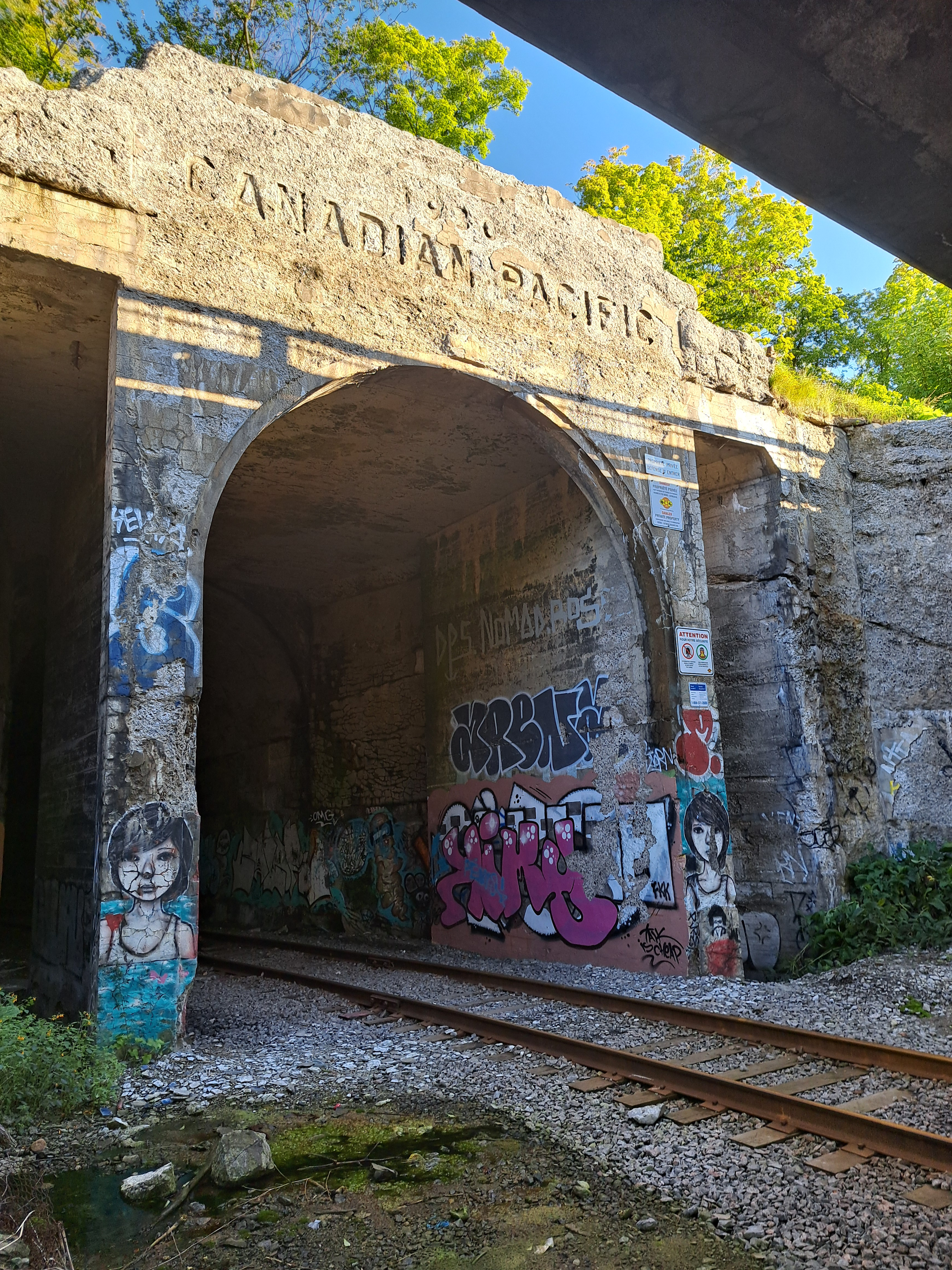
Southern portal of the tunnel in September 2024

== History ==
=== Construction ===
On May 30, 1930, the Administrative Committee of the City of Quebec approved the construction of a Canadian Pacific Railway track from Saint-Malo to Anse au Foulon (Wolfe's Cove). The tunnel was built to accommodate passengers coming from the Empress of Britain, and then taking the train, mainly from Quebec to Montreal. The Canadian Pacific Railway didn't own the railroad line running along the St. Lawrence River, which was operated by the Canadian National Railway.

Around 600 workers worked on the tunnel's construction, and around 80,000 cubic yards of rock and other material were removed in the process. Drilling was completed on February 16, 1931. The first train used the tunnel on 26 May, and the tunnel was officially inaugurated on 1 June 1931, to a crowd of around 100,000 people.

=== Recent history ===
In 1980, with the tunnel barely being used anymore, the mayor of Sillery, Charles-Henri Blais, proposed that the tunnel be transformed into an underground passage for trucks in the winter, as they would be too heavy to climb Gilmour Hill. The proposal was promptly rejected by the Quebec Ministry of Transports. The trains are now operated by the Quebec-Gatineau Railway, which acquired the CPR route between Quebec and Montreal in 1997. Today, they are an infrequent occurrence in the tunnel, passing through a few times per week at most. Since the 2000s, Wolfe's Cove Tunnel has been a popular urbex destination in Quebec City, as evidenced by the numerous graffiti works on its walls on the entire length of the tunnel, particularly near the entrances, as well as the significant amount of discarded trash and rubble along the track.

Between November 2020 and 2023, the tunnel saw a significant increase in usage, as it was used by Canadian National Railway trains, owing to the renovation works taking place on Boulevard Champlain, which included slightly changing the path of the existing CN railroad, blocking access to the Port of Quebec via the coastal railroad.

== Dimensions ==
The tunnel measures 1.6 km (1.0 mi) in length, a little less than 7 m (23 ft) in height, and about 5 m (16 ft) in width. The roof of the tunnel is around 100 m (330 ft) below the highest point of land above.
