= Mount Shaughnessy Tunnel =

Railway tunnel in British Columbia, Canada

- Interactive map of Mount Shaughnessy Tunnel

Overview
- Line: Canadian Pacific Kansas City
- Location: Rogers Pass.
- Coordinates: 51°21′25″N 117°26′24″W
- Status: Active
- Crosses: Selkirk Mountains

Operation
- Opened: 1988
- Traffic: Railway
- Character: Primarily freight service; Some passenger service (Rocky Mountaineer)

Technical
- Length: 1.83 km (1.14 mi)
- No. of tracks: Single
- Track gauge: 4 ft 8 1/2 in (1,435 mm) standard gauge
- Tunnel clearance: 7.9 metres (25 ft 10 in)
- Width: 5.2 metres (17 ft) (straights); 5.5 metres (18 ft) (curves)

Location in British Columbia

The Mount Shaughnessy Tunnel is in southeastern British Columbia, on the Revelstoke–Donald segment. This single-track 1.83-kilometre (1.14 mi) tunnel, which carries the Canadian Pacific Kansas City main line beneath the foothills of Mount Shaughnessy in the Selkirk Mountains, handles mostly westbound traffic. It was constructed by the Canadian Pacific Railway (CP) and opened in 1988.

== Construction ==
This shorter tunnel, which passes under the highway, allowed the desired approach to, and siting of, the east portal of the Mount Macdonald Tunnel. Built first was the adjacent Connaught Creek bridge on the Macdonald Track. Using this access, the Manning-Kumagai (MK) joint venture (comprising Manning Construction & Kumagai Gumi) began to tunnel northward in June 1985. The soft brittle rock initially slowed progress, and work stopped while steel arches were installed. The tunnel lining is reinforced concrete at the south end, and for a few metres at the north end, the remainder being shotcrete. The contractor was fined $132,000 by the Workers' Compensation Board for a series of safety violations relating to both tunnels. The 84 cubic metres (110 cu yd) of rubble produced daily was dumped into the large depression to help create the grade stretching to the Mount Macdonald Tunnel.

Completed in 1987, the finished tunnel height is 7.9 metres (25 ft 10 in), and the width is 5.2 metres (17 ft) on the straights, and 5.5 metres (18 ft) on the curves. The height clearance can accommodate any future electrification. The Paved Concrete Track (PaCT) track rests on a 2.4-metre (7 ft 10.5 in) wide, 22.9-centimetre (9 in) thick, reinforced concrete slab.

== Operation ==
On December 12, 1988, the first revenue train, hauling coal, passed through the tunnel, and saved an hour on the journey. Adding a third locomotive to the head largely resolved an early problem of locomotives stalling in the tunnel. Many freight trains are longer than the tunnel, and transient airflow cools the locomotives as they pass through it. The lack of a forced ventilation system has caused occasional overheating of locomotives. When the lead locomotive of a westbound train is stopped at the signal by the east portal of the Mount Macdonald Tunnel, the engineer may need to shut down any slave units still in the Mount Shaughnessy Tunnel as a precaution.

== Maintenance ==
From early August to the end of September 2002, the Rogers (Fraine) pusher base was temporarily reactivated for the first time since the Macdonald Track opened. This allowed a tunnel closure, when Emil Anderson Construction replaced the concrete lining along the sections adjacent to each portal. Large cross-struts over the track held the 11-by-6-metre (36 by 20 ft) steel forms in place until the concrete cured. Each of the seven set ups took 36 hours from installation to dismantling. To complete the project, the contractor sprayed shotcrete upon the arched ceiling, requiring only 12-hour work blocks. During each closure, westbound trains diverted to the Connaught Track. With longer and heavier trains than in the 1980s, former experienced pusher crews adapted to the new situation. The single-track operation required opposing trains to meet at the Glacier, Stoney Creek, and Griffith sidings. In 2006, a similar exercise occurred during a six-week work project within the tunnel.

For ongoing maintenance, refer PaCT maintenance in Mount Macdonald Tunnel
