= Palliser, British Columbia =

Palliser
- Location of Palliser in British Columbia
- Coordinates: 51°14′59″N 116°43′04″W
- Country: Canada
- Province: British Columbia
- Region: East Kootenay
- Regional District: Columbia-Shuswap
- Area codes: 250, 778, 236, & 672
- Highways: Highway 1

Palliser is a railway point which straddles the shores of the Kicking Horse River in the East Kootenay region of southeastern British Columbia. This ghost town, off BC Highway 1, is by road about 36 kilometres (22 mi) southwest of Field and 21 kilometres (13 mi) southeast of Golden.

== Name origin ==
Although named after John Palliser, leader of the Palliser expedition, he never visited this area. Sir James Hector, another member of the party, explored this valley.

== Railway ==
The westward advance of the Canadian Pacific Railway (CP) rail head passed through Palliser around September 1884.

In 1906, the completion of the Palliser Tunnel about 2.4 kilometres (1.5 mi) west of Palliser eliminated a 23-degree curve. At this location in 1884, a 150-metre (500 ft) tunnel was completed, but collapsed in 1887. A diversion created the sharp curve and three smaller curves. For safety, passenger cars were clamped together to prevent uncoupling. The new tunnel was 212 metres (694 ft) in length.

In 1905, another tunnel was completed about 0.8 kilometres (0.5 mi) east of Palliser. In 1921, an eastbound freight train struck a cave-in along the 94-metre (310 ft) curve. Seven crew were killed, and three hours later, the wreck burst into flames. Traffic was diverted over the Kootenay Central and the Crowsnest Pass until three trestle bridges and 1,100 metres (3,700 ft) of new track were built around the tunnel.

The present passing track is 2,753 metres (9,032 ft) long.

Train Timetables (Regular stop or Flag stop)
	Mile	1887	1891	1898	1905	1909	1912	1916	1919	1929	1932	1935
Donald	51.5	Regular	Regular	Regular	Flag	Flag	Flag	Flag	Flag	Flag	Flag	Flag
Forde	47.5							Flag	Flag	Flag	Flag	Flag
Moberly	41.5	Flag	Flag	Flag	Flag	Flag	Flag	Flag	Flag	Flag	Flag	Flag
Golden	35.0	Regular	Regular	Regular	Regular	Regular	Regular	Regular	Regular	Regular	Regular	Regular
Glenogle	27.8			Flag		Flag	Flag			Flag		
Palliser	22.5	Regular	Regular	Regular	Regular	Regular	Flag	Flag	Flag	Flag		
Leanchoil	17.0	Flag	Flag	Both	Flag	Flag	Flag	Flag	Flag	Flag	Flag	Flag
Misko	12.5										Flag	Flag
Ottertail	8.2	Regular	Flag	Flag	Flag	Flag	Flag		Flag	Flag		
Emerald	4.1						Flag					
Field	0.0	Regular	Regular	Regular	Regular	Regular	Regular	Regular	Regular	Regular	Regular	Regular

== Early community ==
By 1889, Wilmer Cleveland Wells operated a sawmill. By 1890, a general store and hotel were also present. A post office existed 1894–1914. The store was short-lived, but a hotel accommodated visitors into the early 1900s.

In 1901, a Pinkerton Detective agent tracked a bank robber to the community. That year, the population peaked at about 100. The sawmill closed about 1908 but a watchman remained until the completion of clearing the site around 1915. The 1911 Census lists eight residents. By 1918, the place was deserted.

== Maps ==
- "Kootenay map". library.ubc.ca. 1899. p. 1.
- "BC map". www.davidrumsey.com. 1925.
