= Mount Macdonald Tunnel =

Railway tunnel in British Columbia, Canada

- Interactive map of Mount Macdonald Tunnel

Overview
- Line: CPKC
- Location: Rogers Pass
- Coordinates: 51°17′35″N 117°29′58″W
- Status: Active
- Crosses: Selkirk Mountains, below Rogers Pass

Operation
- Opened: 9 November 1988
- Traffic: Railway
- Character: Primarily freight service Some passenger service (Rocky Mountaineer)

Technical
- Length: 9.11 miles (14.66 km)
- No. of tracks: Single
- Track gauge: 4 ft 8 1/2 in (1,435 mm) standard gauge
- Tunnel clearance: 7.9 metres (25 ft 10 in)
- Width: 5.2 metres (17 ft) (straights); 5.5 metres (18 ft) (curves)

Location in British Columbia

The Mount Macdonald Tunnel is in southeastern British Columbia, on the Revelstoke–Donald segment. This single-track 14.66-kilometre (9.11 mi) tunnel, which carries the Canadian Pacific Kansas City (CPKC) main line under Mount Macdonald in the Selkirk Mountains, handles most westbound traffic, whereas the Connaught Tunnel handles mostly eastbound. The tunnel was opened by the Canadian Pacific Railway (CP) in 1988.

== Shortcomings of the Connaught Track ==
By the 1970s, it was evident that the Connaught Tunnel alone could not meet the increasing traffic demands. The major growth opportunities were primarily in the bulk commodities of coal, sulphur, and potash. In 1980, the estimated construction cost of $300 million was almost 20% of CP's gross income for 1979. Furthermore, westbound grain transportation had been an ongoing liability for the railways. Consequently, CP was unwilling to proceed with a new tunnel unless the Crow Rate, which did not cover the variable cost of grain movement, was addressed. In response, the federal government gradually increased this rate from 1983, before abandoning rate regulation in 1993.

The need for pusher locomotives was another encumbrance. During the pusher station's existence, six engineers, six maintenance workers, and nine locomotives were based at Rogers. Five-unit engines were used on heavy trains carrying grain, coal, and potash. Four-unit engines were used on other freights. A significant grade improvement would eliminate the need for pushers.

== Proposals ==
To enable the reintroduction of double tracks, three schemes required a 1.8-metre (6 ft) lowering of the Connaught Tunnel floor, complemented by a new approach to serve the east portal:

- south side of the Beaver Valley with a loop up to the portal.
- higher than the existing track, requiring higher bridges over the five major streams, before levelling to the portal.
- below the existing track from Rogers with 1.0% grade to Stoney Creek, followed by two 1.6-kilometre-long (1 mi) spiral tunnels up to the portal.

However, lowering the floor would be extremely difficult while maintaining traffic flow.

Three schemes offered a straight new tunnel at a lower elevation:

- approximating the 14.6-kilometre (9.1 mi) tunnel as built.
- a 15.8-kilometre (9.8 mi) tunnel from about the chosen west portal to about the Mount Shaughnessy Tunnel south portal.
- a 12.4-kilometre (7.7 mi) tunnel from about 250 metres (820 ft) west of Loop Creek to about the chosen east portal.

Mike Wakely, Regional Engineer, Special Projects, suggested the selected option, which provided a 1.0% grade from Rogers, and a west portal 4.8 kilometres (3.0 mi) west of Glacier station. The budget, including approaches, was $600 million. In 1975, preparatory work began in earnest.

== Macdonald Track ==
The 34.8-kilometre (21.6 mi) route of surface track and tunnels, within a 30-metre (100 ft) wide right-of-way, uses continuous welded rail.

Macdonald Tunnel route
Mile	Location		Mile	Location		Mile	Location	
68.3	Fraine	^{a}	74.5	Gully bridge		78.6	Connaught Creek bridge	^{i}
68.6	Cupola Creek bridge	^{b}	75.0	Surprise Creek culvert		79.3	Bear Creek	^{j}
69.4	Alder Creek culvert	^{c}	75.0	Wakely	^{e}	79.4	Mt. Macdonald Tunnel (E. portal)	
71.3	Mountain Creek bridge	^{d}	76.5	Stoney Creek bridge	^{f}	84.9	Macdonald	^{k}
73.7	Cedar Creek culvert		77.1	John Fox viaduct	^{g}	88.5	Mt. Macdonald Tunnel (W. portal)	
74.2	Raspberry Creek culvert		78.0	Mount Shaughnessy Tunnel	^{h}	89.9	Ross Peak	

^a. Connaught Track and Macdonald Track diverge; named for former Pacific Region V.P.; previously called Rogers.
^b. Length: 40-metre (130 ft); two span; double track; Cana Construction completed in July 1984.
^c. Connaught Track had to be moved 9.1 metres (30 ft) into the mountainside along this section to accommodate the new lower track.
^d. Length: 96-metre (315 ft); 2 × 250-ton spans. Height: about 44 metres (145 ft) below Mountain Creek bridge on Connaught Track. Cana Construction completed in fall 1985.
^e. A 2,700-metre (8,800 ft) siding; named after Mike Wakely, a former chief construction engineer, who oversaw the years of preparatory work, but retired before the work was properly underway, and died soon after, never to see the completed project.
^f. Length: 210 metres (700 ft); seven spans. Height: about 150 metres (500 ft) below Stoney Creek bridge on Connaught Track.
^g. Length: 1,229 metres (4,032 ft); Pitts Engineering Construction began work in 1985; 45 × 27.18-metre (89 ft 2 in) steel spans, each weighing 82 tonnes; brought from Calgary via the Crowsnest Pass, because too wide for the Spiral Tunnels, and unloaded at the south end of the new Stoney Creek bridge; supported on 44 custom-designed piers and two abutments; pier heights range from 4.6 metres (15 ft) to 21 metres (70 ft); cut and fill not adopted because it would undermine Connaught Track above, and encroach on highway below; spans installed from early 1987 to that July; walkway on north side; named after John Fox.
^h. Length 1.83 kilometres (1.14 mi).
^i. Length 48 metres (156 ft); single span; comprises a pair of 70-ton deck plate girders, offloaded near the east portal of the Connaught Tunnel, and hauled up to the highway and down to the site; Cana Construction built.
^j. A railway point.
^k. A railway point.

== Construction ==
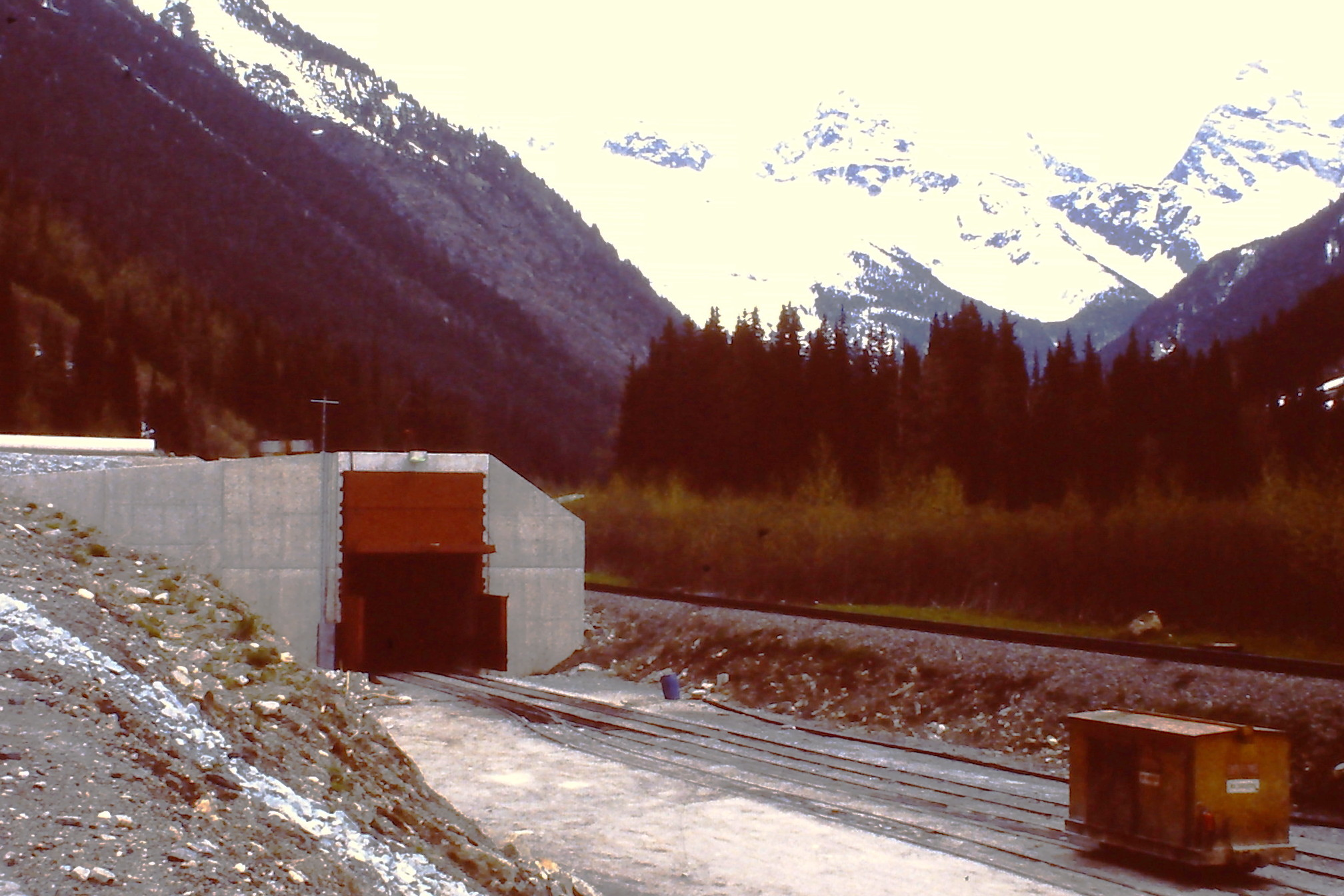
West portal (construction phase)

CP built a substation in Revelstoke and from it constructed a 35 kV operating distribution line along the railway right-of-way; originally built using both 69 kV insulators and construction standards.

On August 27, 1984, the Selkirk Construction joint venture (comprising S.A. Healey, Foundation Company of Canada, and Atlas Construction) began blasting from the east portal. By mid-October, sufficient room existed to install their 6.7-metre-diameter (22 ft), 18-metre-long (60 ft) tunnel-boring machine (TBM). In December 1985, the tunnel passed 110 metres (360 ft) below the Connaught one, almost directly beneath the mountain peak. On completion, Selkirk Construction had advanced 8.45 kilometres (5.25 mi) westward.

On October 5, 1984, the Manning-Kumagai (MK) joint venture (comprising Manning Construction and Kumagai Gumi) began from the west portal. Using the drilling and blasting method, 30 men, rostered in 3 shifts, completed 5.8 kilometres (3.6 mi) eastward. Meanwhile, the highway was temporarily relocated to construct a 270-metre-long (880 ft) reinforced concrete box in a cut-and-cover trench. This structure carries both the highway and protects the portal from avalanches. In 1985, the words "Mount Macdonald Tunnel 1988" were stamped into the concrete cladding above the portal. The eastern work camp was near the Mount Shaughnessy Tunnel, and the western one at Flat Creek. A third camp for summer surface workers existed near Rogers.

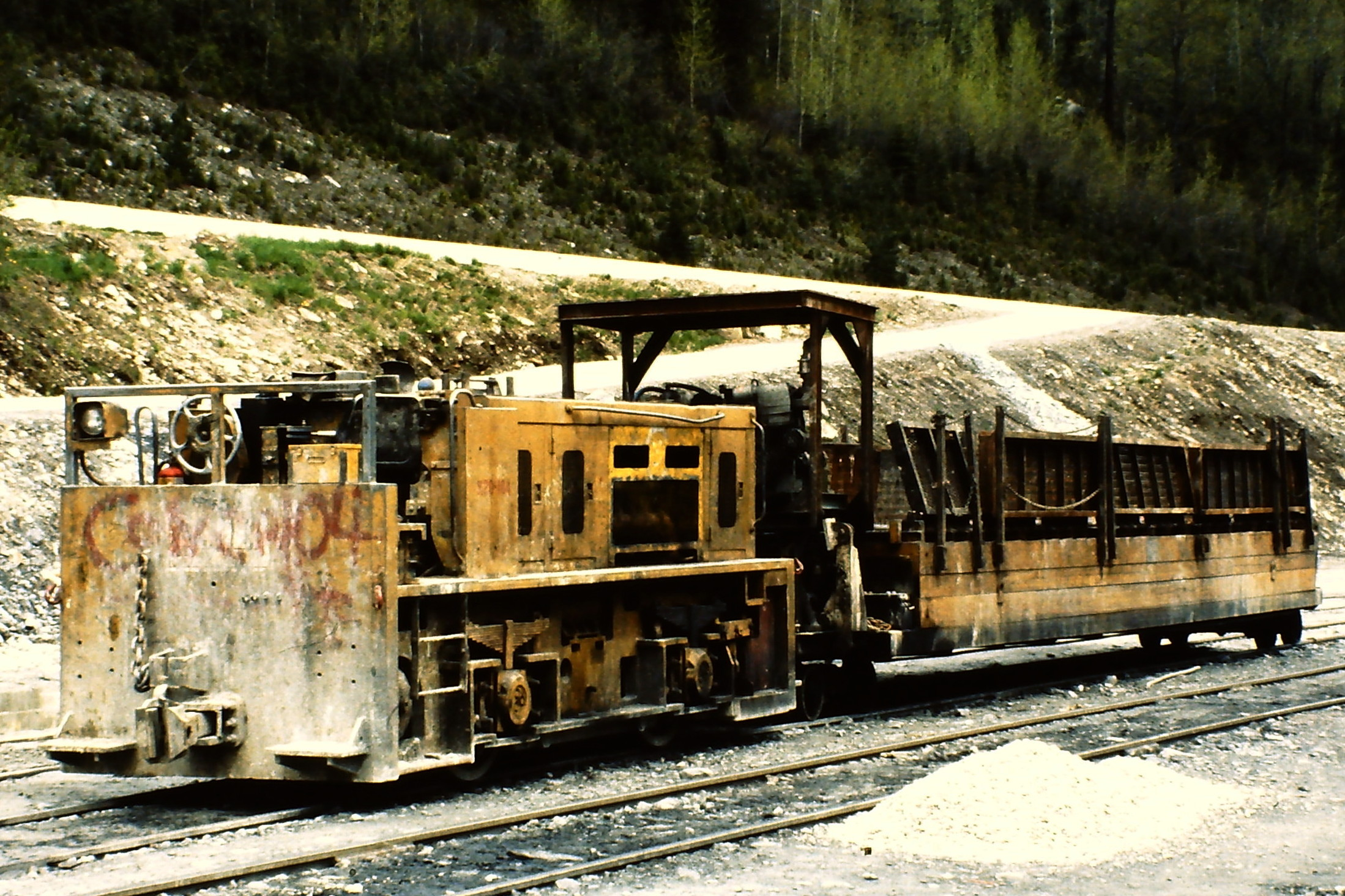
Work train (construction phase)

Breaking through on October 24, 1986, the approaching tunnels joined. Cementation Canada sank the 8.5-metre-diameter (28 ft), 350-metre-deep (1,150 ft) ventilation shaft. MK drilled and blasted the gate chamber below, and air tunnels to, this shaft. After concrete lining, the tunnel height is 7.9 metres (25 ft 10 in), and the width is 5.2 metres (17 ft) on the straights, and 5.5 metres (18 ft) on the curves. In September 1988, the final track concrete was poured. The paved concrete track (PaCT) rests on a 2.4-metre-wide (7 ft 10.5 in), 230-millimetre-thick (9 in) reinforced concrete slab. The height clearance can accommodate any future electrification.

A fleet of 50 dump cars were built exclusively for the project. About 5,000 tons of material were removed daily from the western side. Parks Canada allowed some dumping about 4.5 kilometres (2.8 mi) from the portal, creating a bed for track twinning. The remainder was dumped outside the park boundary at various proposed double-tracking sites between Golden and Revelstoke. The 500 cubic metres (660 cu yd) of rubble produced daily at the eastern end was dumped into a large depression to create the grade. Minus the 48-metre (156 ft) bridge, this fill covered the 1,337-metre (4,386 ft) distance to the Mount Shaughnessy Tunnel.

== Tunnel ventilation ==
Because of the tunnel's length and lack of electrification, it uses a ventilation system consisting of a series of huge fans which clear the tunnel of diesel exhaust left behind by the locomotives. The tunnel also has large doors at the portals and the mid-point which can open and close whenever the tunnel needs to be cleared out.

The purpose of the ventilation system is to prevent locomotives overheating and remove air pollutants. The opening and closing of the gates at the portals and mid-point assists the extraction process. The mid-tunnel gate structure stands inside a 25-metre-long (82 ft), 27-metre-high (88 ft), and 16-metre-wide (52 ft) cavern. In a power failure, counterweights return all gates to the up position. Each gate has a central wooden panel designed to break if struck by a train. Although monitored at the Revelstoke control centre, the ventilation system is computer controlled, and adjusts to the type and size of train. Standing at the top of the shaft, near the Rogers Pass highway summit, the ventilation building houses four fans, a standby 2.8-megawatt (3,800 hp) diesel generator, and two elevators. Used by maintenance staff, each open cage takes 11 1/2 minutes to slowly descend an open elevator shaft to tunnel level. A straight tunnel would have made the shaft location clearly visible from the summit monument. To hide the complex, a slight kink was made in the tunnel alignment.

== Operation ==
On November 9, 1988, the first official train travelled the Macdonald Track westward. About 535 metres (1,755 ft) west of the west portal, R.S Allison, CP president, connected the last track clip. On December 12, 1988, the first revenue train, hauling coal, passed through the tunnel, and saved an hour on the journey. The official opening of the $422 million tunnel was in May 1989. The crest at the west portal is 90 metres (295 ft) lower than the Connaught crest. The 0.7% gradient westward eliminated the need for pusher locomotives. Nowadays, locomotives can climb the grade at 32 kilometres per hour (20 mph). Loaded coal trains travel at 14 to 21 kilometres per hour (9 to 13 mph) through the tunnel. To ensure frequency vibrations do not cause damage to the track structure, the speed limit for all traffic is 48 kilometres per hour (30 mph).

== Maintenance ==
CP repairs 15 to 61 metres (50 to 200 ft) of PaCT each year. Drain holes cored down to a longitudinal collector drain under the tunnel reduce failures from excessive surface water. Slab cracking, owing to insufficient lateral and longitudinal reinforcing in the PaCT slab, can be repaired with epoxy resin in minor cases. Injecting the resin restores structural integrity. Slab removal and replacement is needed in serious cases. From 1993 to 2020, a total of 115 metres (378 ft) of PaCT were replaced in the two tunnels.

The hardware for power, communications, and signalling is obsolete. The slow ventilation systems can take 45 minutes to purge the air after each train. In 2019, consultants were advising on possible improvements, but it will probably take 5 to 10 years to modernize the tunnel.

== Notability ==
Twelfth longest railway tunnel when opened:

1. Seikan Tunnel (1988) (Japan) 53.85 km (33.46 mi)
2. Daishimizu Tunnel (1982) (Japan) 22.20 km (13.79 mi)
3. Simplon Tunnel (1906) (Switzerland) 19.80 km (12.30 mi)
4. Shin Kanmon Tunnel (1975) (Japan) 18.71 km (11.63 mi)
5. Apennine Base Tunnel (1934) (Italy) 18.51 km (11.50 mi)
6. Rokkō Tunnel (1972) 16.25 km (10.10 mi)
7. Furka Base Tunnel (1982) (Switzerland) 15.44 km (9.59 mi)
8. Haruna (1982) 15.35 km (9.54 mi)
9. Monte Santomarco Tunnel (1987) (Italy) 15.04 km (9.35 mi)
10. Gotthard Tunnel (1882) (Switzerland) 15.00 km (9.32 mi)
11. Nakayama (1982) 14.86 km (9.23 mi)
12. Mount Macdonald Tunnel (1988) 14.66 km (9.11 mi)

However, it took the title from the Cascade Tunnel (1929) 12.6 km (7.8 mi) as the longest railway tunnel in North America. The project was the largest CP expansion of capacity since the building of the transcontinental in the early 1880s. In 2016, the tunnel was inducted into the North America Railway Hall of Fame. Tunnel 4 of the Cuajone–El Sargento line in Peru is of similar length, and which is the longer of the two is disputed.

== Accidents ==
2005: While clearing ice in the tunnel, an employee died when struck by a falling 225-kilogram (496 lb) chunk.

2019: An avalanche descending upon a stopped train at Wakely derailed seven container-carrying flatcars.
