= Michael (surname) =

Michael is a surname. Notable people with the surname include:

- Alan Michael (born 1967), Scottish artist
- Ali Michael (born 1990), American fashion model
- Alun Michael (born 1943), British politician
- Andrew Michael (entrepreneur) (born 1980), British entrepreneur
- Arky Michael, Australian actor and writer
- Arthur Michael (1853–1942), American chemist
- Asot Michael, Antigua and Barbuda politician
- Barry Michael (born 1955), Australian boxer
- Bill Michael (1935–2016), American football coach
- Bill Michael (footballer) (1874–?), Scottish footballer
- Blake Michael (born 1996), American actor
- Charles W. Michael (died 1915), American politician
- Christine Michael (born 1990), American football player
- Christopher Michael, American actor
- Chrysis Michael (born 1977), Cypriot footballer
- Clem Michael (born 1976), Australian rules footballer
- Con Michael (born 1953), Australian cricketer
- Danny Michael, American audio engineer
- Enid Michael (1883–1966), American ranger-naturalist
- Ernest Michael (1925–2013), American mathematician
- Gene Michael (1938–2017), American baseball player, manager and executive
- George Michael (1963–2016), English musician, singer-songwriter and record producer
- Gertrude Michael (1911–1964), American actress
- Glen Michael (1926–2025), British television presenter and radio personality
- Gregory Michael (born 1981), American actor
- Harold Michael (born 1943), American politician
- Harry Michael (born 1992), Australian rapper and songwriter, known professionally as Masked Wolf
- Helen Abbott Michael (1857–1904), American chemist and physician
- Holger Michael (born 1954), German diplomat
- Ib Michael (born 1945), Danish novelist and poet
- Jack Michael, American psychologist
- James Michael (born 1968), American singer, musician and record producer
- Jere Michael (born 1977), American figure skater
- John Michael, multiple people
- Jonathan Michael, British civil servant
- Jörg Michael (born 1963), German drummer
- Judith Michael, American writer
- Juliet Raphael Michael, South Sudanese politician
- Junior Michael (born 1971), Samoan footballer
- Kamran Michael, Pakistani politician
- Kate Michael (born 1982), American beauty pageant winner
- Keith Michael (born 1972), American fashion designer
- Ken Michael (born 1938), Australian politician
- Kevin Michael (born 1985), American musician
- Levi Michael (born 1991), American baseball player
- Livi Michael (born 1960), English writer
- Lorraine Michael (born 1943), Canadian politician
- Magali Cornier Michael, American literary critic
- Maggie Michael (born 1974), American painter
- Mal Michael (born 1977), Australian rules footballer
- Marcos Michael (born 1991), Cypriot footballer
- Michael Michael (born 1957), English criminal
- Mick Michael (1922–2016), Australian politician
- Molly Michael, Oval Office operations coordinator
- Nadja Michael (born 1969), German opera singer
- Nancy Michael, American politician
- Natasha Michael, South African politician
- Paul Michael, American actor
- Philip Michael, English actor
- Riad Michael, German musician and music producer
- Rich Michael (1938–2011), American football player
- Robert Michael (footballer) (1879–1963), Australian rules footballer
- Rod Michael (born 1985), American singer
- Roger Michael, British nightlife consultant
- Sam Michael (born 1971), Australian Formula One sporting director
- Sami Michael (1926–2024), Israeli writer
- Sarah Michael (born 1990), Nigerian footballer
- Sean Cameron Michael (born 1969), South African actor, writer and singer
- Stephen Michael (born 1956), Australian rules footballer
- Tilman Michael, German chorus master
- Wijdan Michael, Iraqi politician
- Yegizaw Michael, Eritrean artist

== Name disambiguation pages ==
- Alan Michael
- Andrew Michael
- David Michael
- Edward Michael
- George Michael
- Ian Michael
- Jacob Michael
- James Michael
- John Michael
- Peter Michael
- Robert Michael
- William Michael

== See also ==
- Michael, given name
  - List of people with given name Michael
