= Mount Lougheed =

Mountain in Alberta, Canada

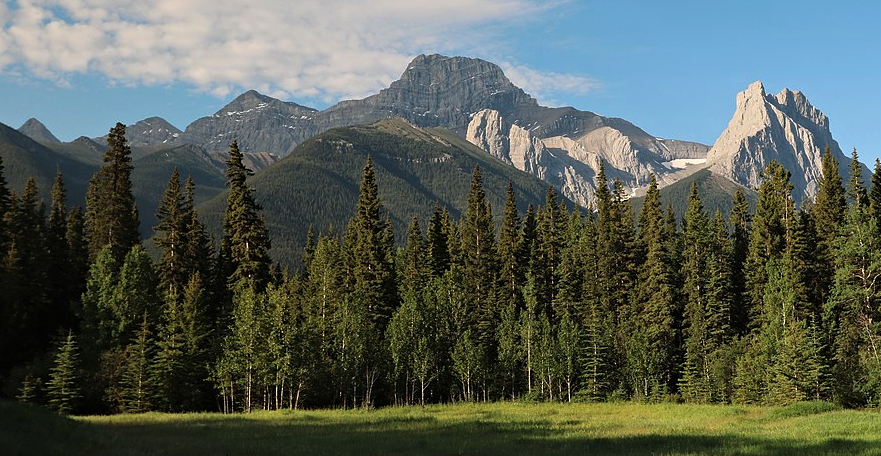
- Mount Lougheed (Peak 1 centered)

Highest point
- Elevation: 3,107 m (10,194 ft)
- Prominence: 242 m (794 ft)
- Parent peak: Wind Mountain (3153 m)
- Listing: Mountains of Alberta
- Coordinates: 50°57′56″N 115°15′45″W

Geography
- Location within Alberta Location within Canada
- Interactive map of Mount Lougheed
- Country: Canada
- Province: Alberta
- Parent range: Canadian Rockies
- Topo map: NTS 82J14 Spray Lakes Reservoir

Geology
- Rock age: Cambrian
- Rock type: Palliser limestone

Climbing
- First ascent: 1889 by A. St. Cyr, W.S. Drewry, Tom Wilson
- Easiest route: Climbing YDS 5.5

Mount Lougheed (/ˈlɔːhiːd/ LAW-heed) is a 3,107-metre (10,194-foot) triple-peak mountain located between Spray Lakes Reservoir and the Wind Valley of Kananaskis Country in the Canadian Rockies of Alberta, Canada. The highest summit is known as Peak 2 (3,107 metres). Peak 1 to the northwest is 3,080 metres. Peak 3 to the southeast is 3,010 metres. The nearest higher peak is Wind Mountain, 2.0 km (1.2 mi) to the southeast. Mount Lougheed is a conspicuous landmark that can be seen from Highway 1, the Trans-Canada Highway at Dead Man's Flats which is east of Canmore.

== History ==
Mount Lougheed was named after Sir James Lougheed (1854–1925), a prominent lawyer, politician, senator, and cabinet minister. The mountain was originally named Wind Mountain by Eugène Bourgeau of the Palliser expedition, but was renamed in 1928 to honor Lougheed after his death. The mountain's name was officially adopted in 1928 by the Geographical Names Board of Canada. The first ascent was made in 1889 by A. St. Cyr, W.S. Drewry, and Tom Wilson. Mount Lougheed was the scene of the second of three related airplane crashes known as the Rescue 807 Crashes.

== Geology ==
Mount Lougheed is composed of Palliser limestone, a sedimentary rock laid down during the Precambrian to Jurassic periods. Formed in shallow seas, this sedimentary rock was pushed east and over the top of younger rock during the Laramide orogeny.

== Climate ==
Based on the Köppen climate classification, Mount Lougheed is located in a subarctic climate zone with cold, snowy winters, and mild summers. Temperatures can drop below −20 °C with wind chill factors below −30 °C. Precipitation runoff from Mount Lougheed drains into the Bow River which is a tributary of the Saskatchewan River.

== Gallery ==
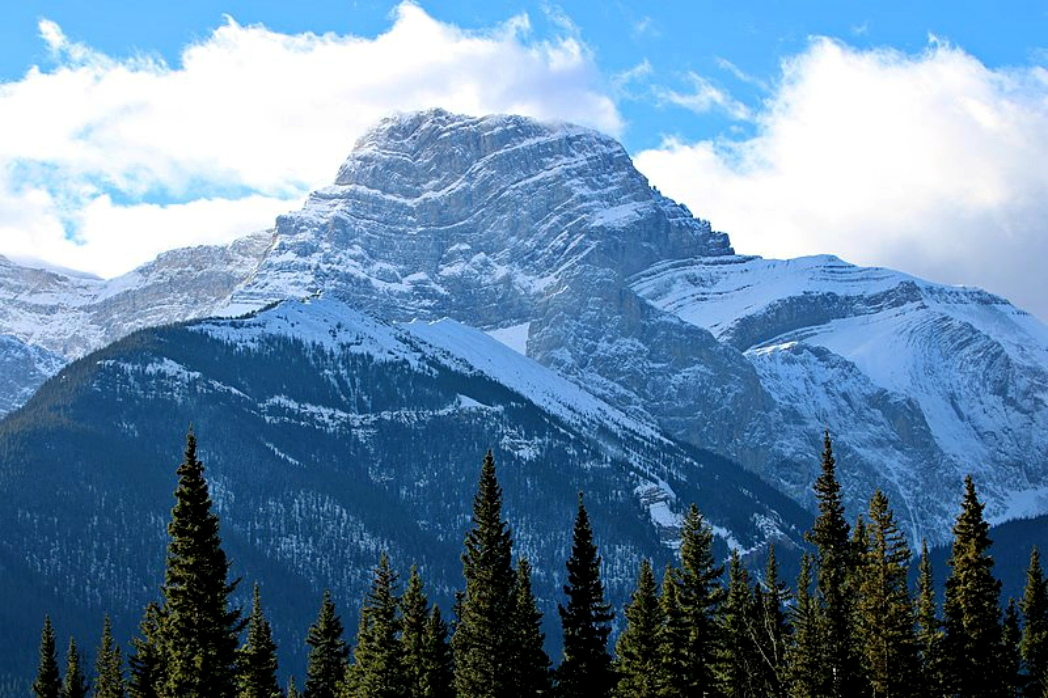
Mount Lougheed Peak 1

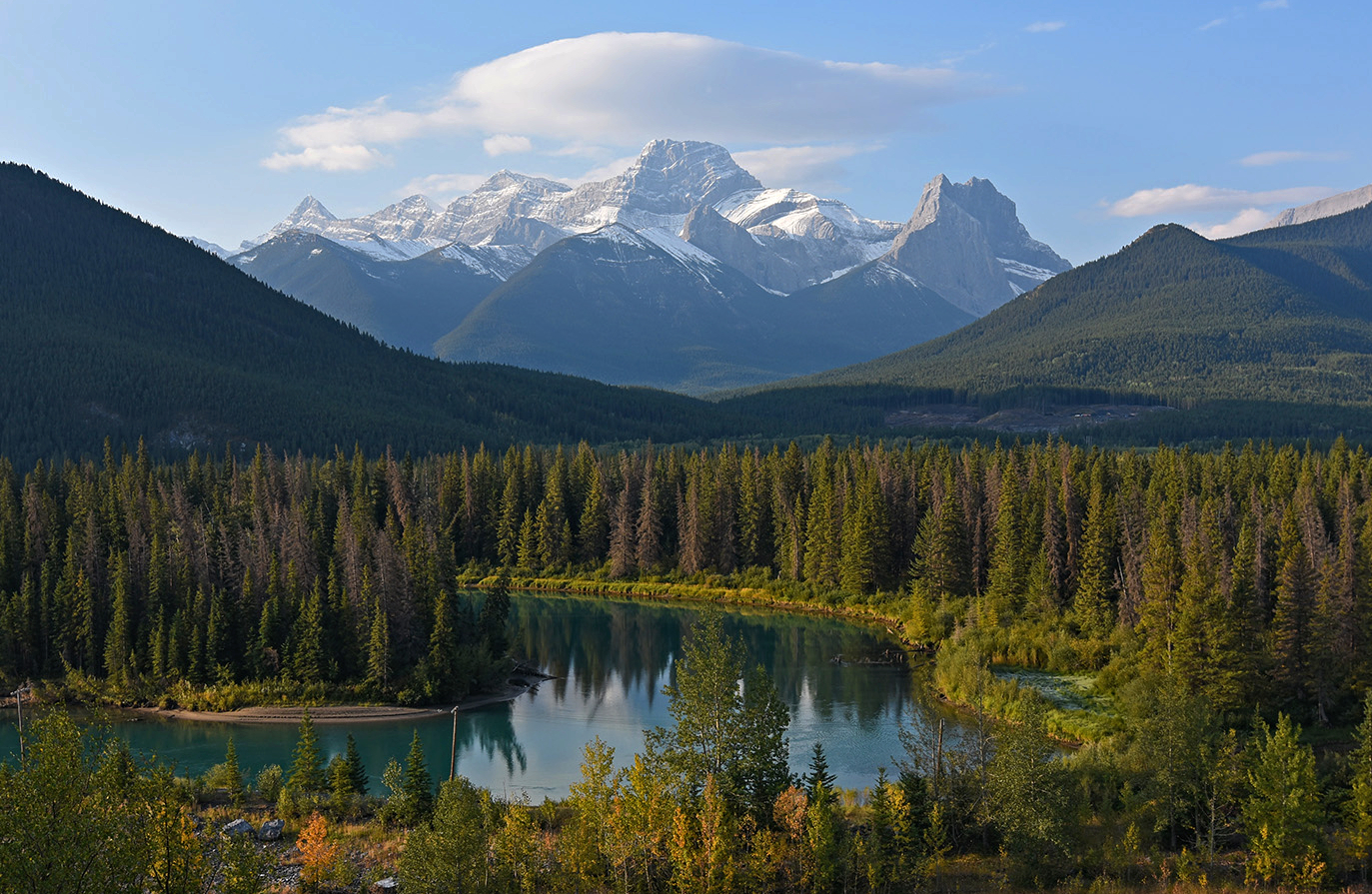
Mt. Lougheed flanked by Wind Mountain and Windtower

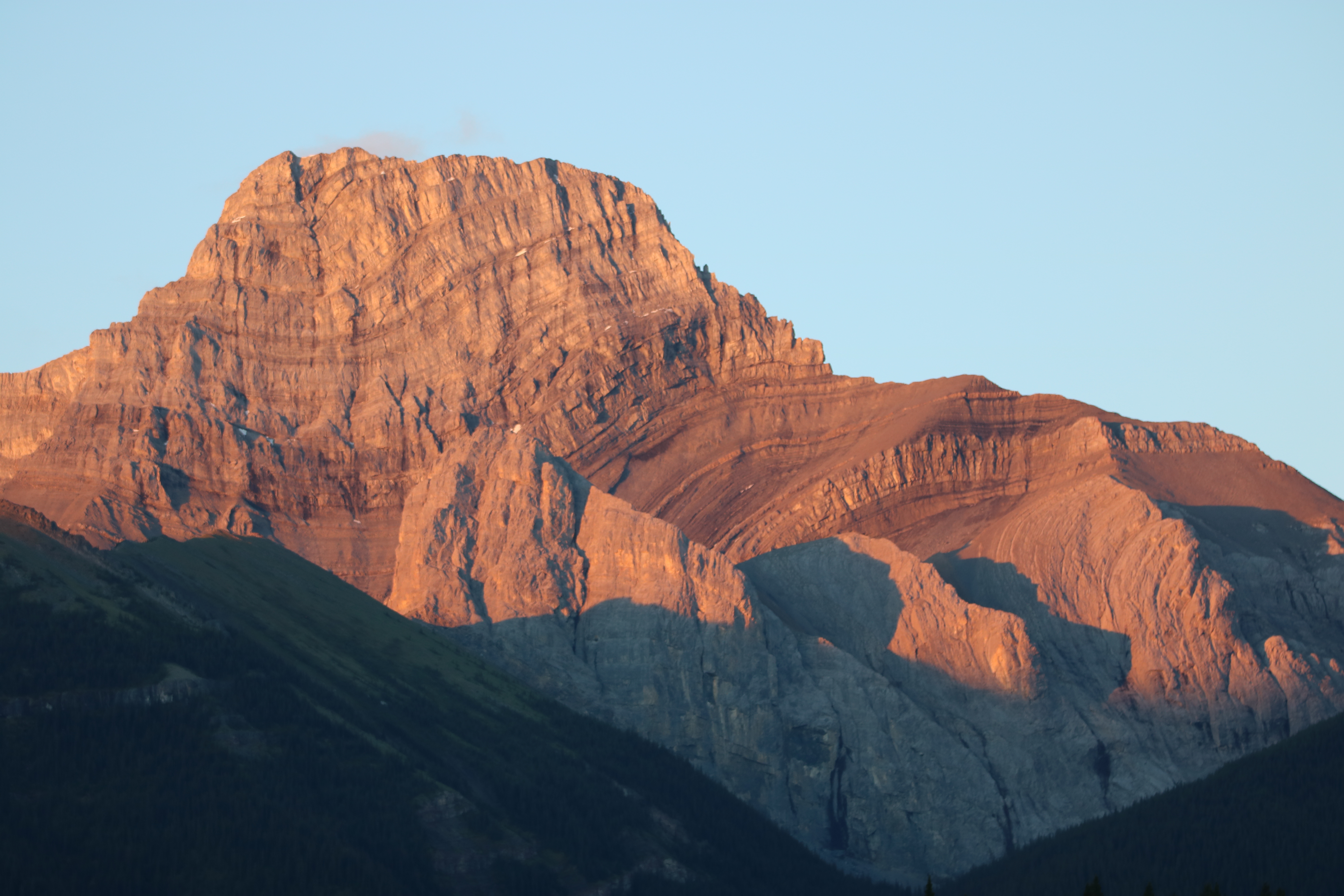
Sunrise at Mount Lougheed Peak 1

== See also ==
- Kananaskis Range
