= Mike James =

Mike or Michael James may refer to:

== Arts and entertainment ==
- Michael James (quilt artist) (born 1949), American artist
- Michael James (producer) (born 1962), American record producer, guitarist, and mixing engineer
- Michael James (writer) (fl. 1999–2005), British novelist
- Michael James (singer) (born 1988), British singer and songwriter

== Sports ==
- Michael James (cricketer, born 1934), English cricketer
- Mike James (baseball) (born 1967), American baseball player
- Michael James (Australian footballer) (born 1971), Australian rules footballer
- Mike James (rugby union) (born 1973), Canadian rugby union player
- Mike James (basketball, born 1975), American basketball player
- Michael James (cricketer, born 1987), English cricketer
- Mike James (basketball, born 1990), American basketball player
- Mike James (American football) (born 1991), American football running back

== Others ==
- Michael James (politician) (1861–1943), Canadian politician
- Michael N. G. James (1940–2023), Canadian biochemist

== See also ==
- James Michael (disambiguation)
- Mickie James (born 1979), American professional wrestler
