= Mount Burgess =

Mountain in Yoho NP, BC, Canada

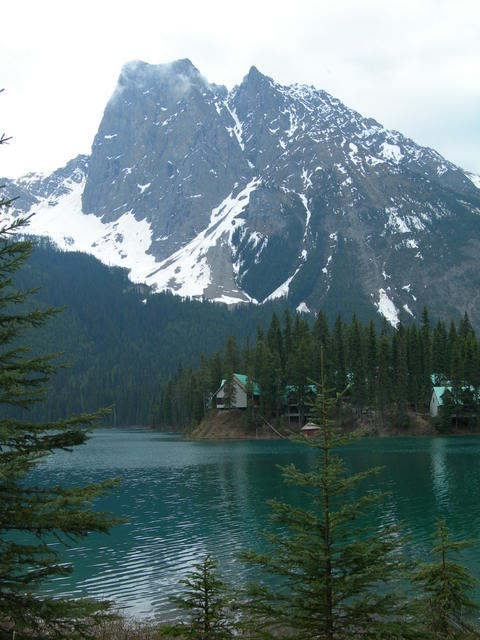
- Mount Burgess background and Emerald Lake foreground

Highest point
- Elevation: 2,599 m (8,527 ft)
- Prominence: 418 m (1,371 ft)
- Parent peak: Mount Field (2642 m)
- Listing: Mountains of British Columbia
- Coordinates: 51°25′12″N 116°30′19″W

Geography
- Location within British Columbia
- Interactive map of Mount Burgess
- Location: British Columbia, Canada
- District: Kootenay Land District
- Parent range: President Range
- Topo map: NTS 82N7 Golden

Climbing
- First ascent: 1892 by James J. McArthur and H. Tuzo
- Easiest route: Scramble

Mount Burgess, 2,599 m (8,527 ft), is a mountain in Yoho National Park and is part of the President Range in the Canadian Rockies. It is located in the southwest buttress of Burgess Pass in the Emerald River and Kicking Horse River Valleys.

== History ==
It was named in 1886 by astronomer Otto Klotz after Alexander MacKinnon Burgess, the Deputy Minister of the Interior at the time when Klotz worked for a railway construction.

In 1892, James J. McArthur was the first to ascend this mountain. He was completing a survey of the lands adjacent to the Canadian Pacific Railway.

In 1909, geologist Charles D. Walcott discovered the Burgess Shale deposit of fossils with fine details on Mount Burgess. The Burgess Shale is a black shale fossil bed (Lagerstätte) named after nearby Burgess Pass, in which are found new and unique species, many in fact constituting entire new phyla of life, and even today some of these unique species have proven impossible to classify. The fossils are especially valuable because they include appendages and soft parts that are rarely preserved. At 508 million years (middle Cambrian) old, it is one of the earliest fossil beds containing soft-part imprints.

The mountain has two summits. The lower north summit was named Walcott Peak in his honour.

Between 1954 and 1971, Mount Burgess was featured on the back of the Canadian ten-dollar bill.

In 1984, UNESCO declared the area a World Heritage Site.

== See also ==
- Field, British Columbia
