= Alan-Michael =

Alan-Michael is a given name. It may refer to:

- Alan-Michael Cash (born 1987), American football player
- Alan-Michael Spaulding, fictional character

== See also ==
- Alan Michael (born 1967), Scottish artist
- Alan Michael Sugar (born 1947), English businessman
