= Michael Peak =

Mountain in British Columbia, Canada

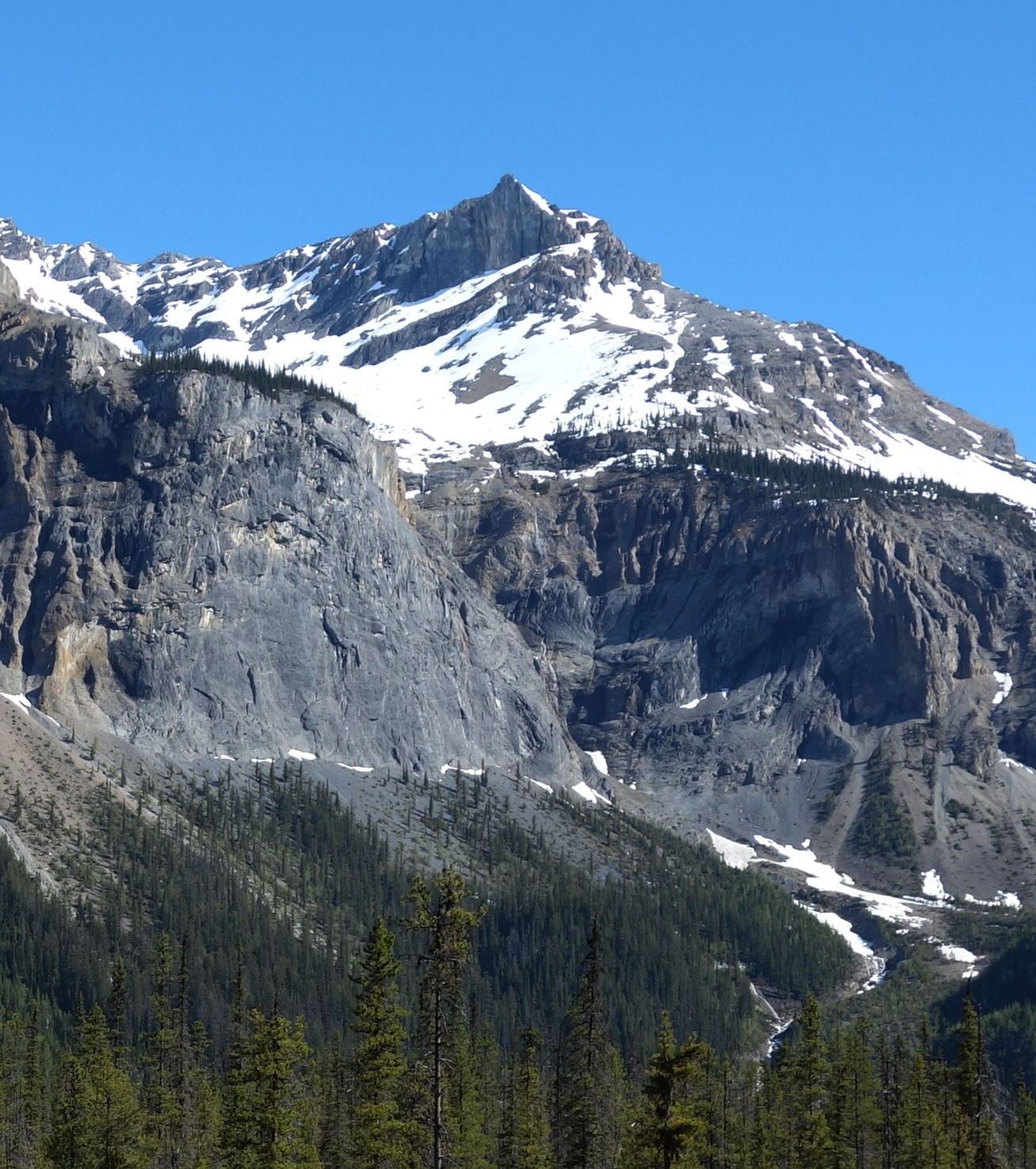
- Michael Peak seen from Emerald Lake

Highest point
- Elevation: 2,701 m (8,862 ft)
- Prominence: 56 m (184 ft)
- Parent peak: The President (3123 m)
- Listing: Mountains of British Columbia
- Coordinates: 51°28′58″N 116°30′47″W

Geography
- Location within British Columbia Location within Canada
- Interactive map of Michael Peak
- Location: British Columbia, Canada
- District: Kootenay Land District
- Parent range: President Range; Canadian Rockies
- Topo map: NTS 82N7 Golden

Geology
- Rock age: Cambrian
- Rock type: sedimentary rock

Climbing
- First ascent: 1900 James Outram, Christian Kaufmann.
- Easiest route: Mountaineering

Michael Peak is a 2,701-metre (8,862-foot) mountain summit located in Yoho National Park, in the Canadian Rockies of British Columbia, Canada. Its nearest higher peak is The President, 4.0 km (2.5 mi) to the west-northwest. Both are part of the President Range which is a subset of the Waputik Mountains. Michael Peak is a landmark seen 4.5 kilometres north-northeast of Emerald Lake, three kilometres southwest of Takakkaw Falls, and 10 kilometres north of Field, British Columbia.

== History ==
Originally known as Angle Peak, the mountain was renamed by Edward Whymper in 1901 for his friend Arthur Michael (1853–1942), an organic chemistry professor who participated in the 1897 first ascents of Mount Lefroy and Mount Victoria with J. Norman Collie, also a fellow Professor of Organic Chemistry.

The first ascent of Michael Peak was made 1900 by James Outram, with Christian Kaufmann as guide. Outram wrote of it: "Making the ascent entirely on rocks we succeeded in obtaining quite an interesting scramble to the sharp peak we were aiming at and quickly reached the little pinnacle, about 8500 feet above the sea and 2500 feet above the pass. It proved to be the terminal point of the long eastern ridge of the President Group, but little elevated above the arête connecting it with the next in the series of minor peaks, yet presenting quite an imposing appearance from below."

The mountain's name was officially adopted in 1924 when approved by the Geographical Names Board of Canada.

== Geology ==
Michael Peak is composed of sedimentary rock laid down during the Cambrian period. Formed in shallow seas, this sedimentary rock was pushed east and over the top of younger rock during the Laramide orogeny. The Emerald Glacier lies on the north aspect of the peak, which in combination with a glacier to the west, sculpted the rock into an arête which connects the peak to the President group.

== Climate ==
Based on the Köppen climate classification, Michael Peak is located in a subarctic climate zone with cold, snowy winters, and mild summers. Temperatures can drop below −20 C with wind chill factors below −30 C. Precipitation runoff from Michael Peak drains into the Yoho River and Emerald River, which are both tributaries of the Kicking Horse River.

== Gallery ==
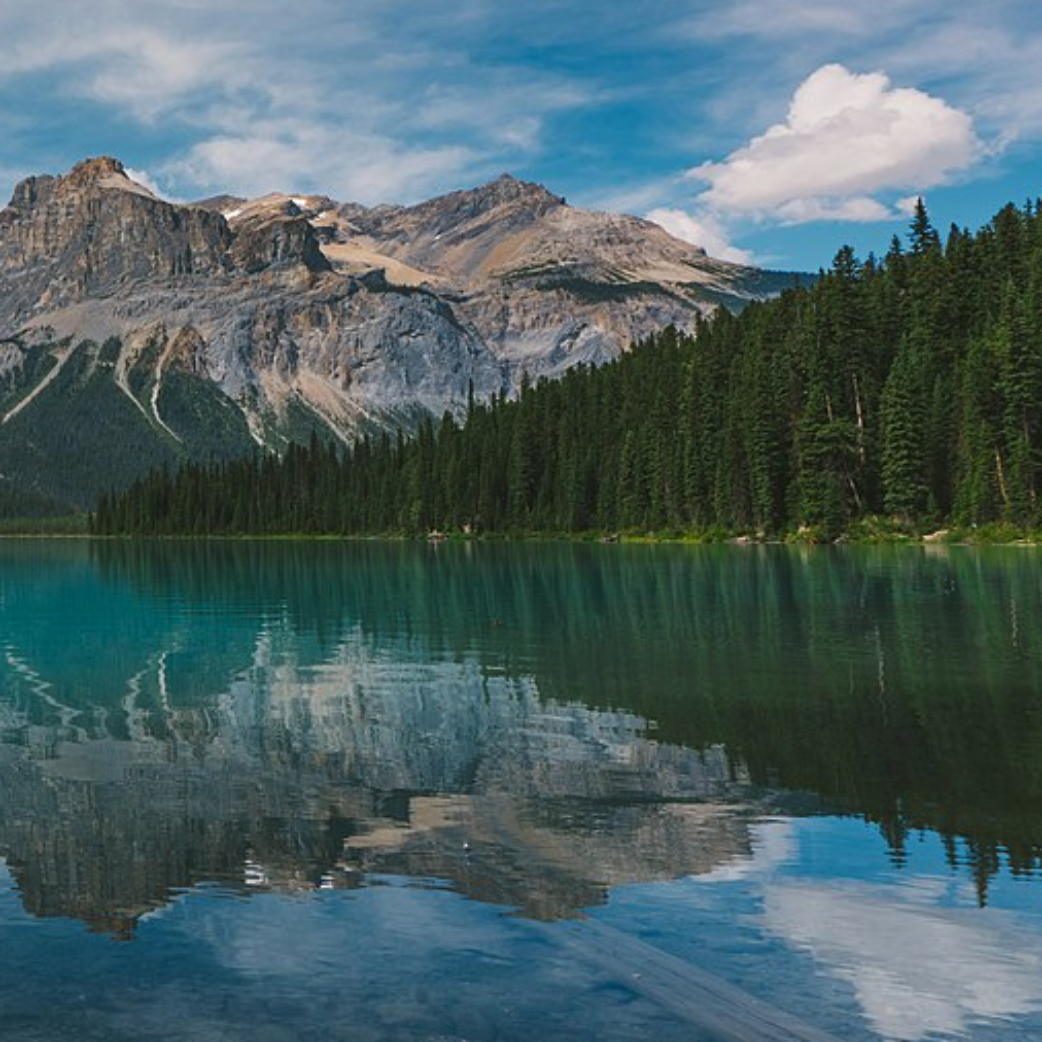
Michael Peak reflected in Emerald Lake

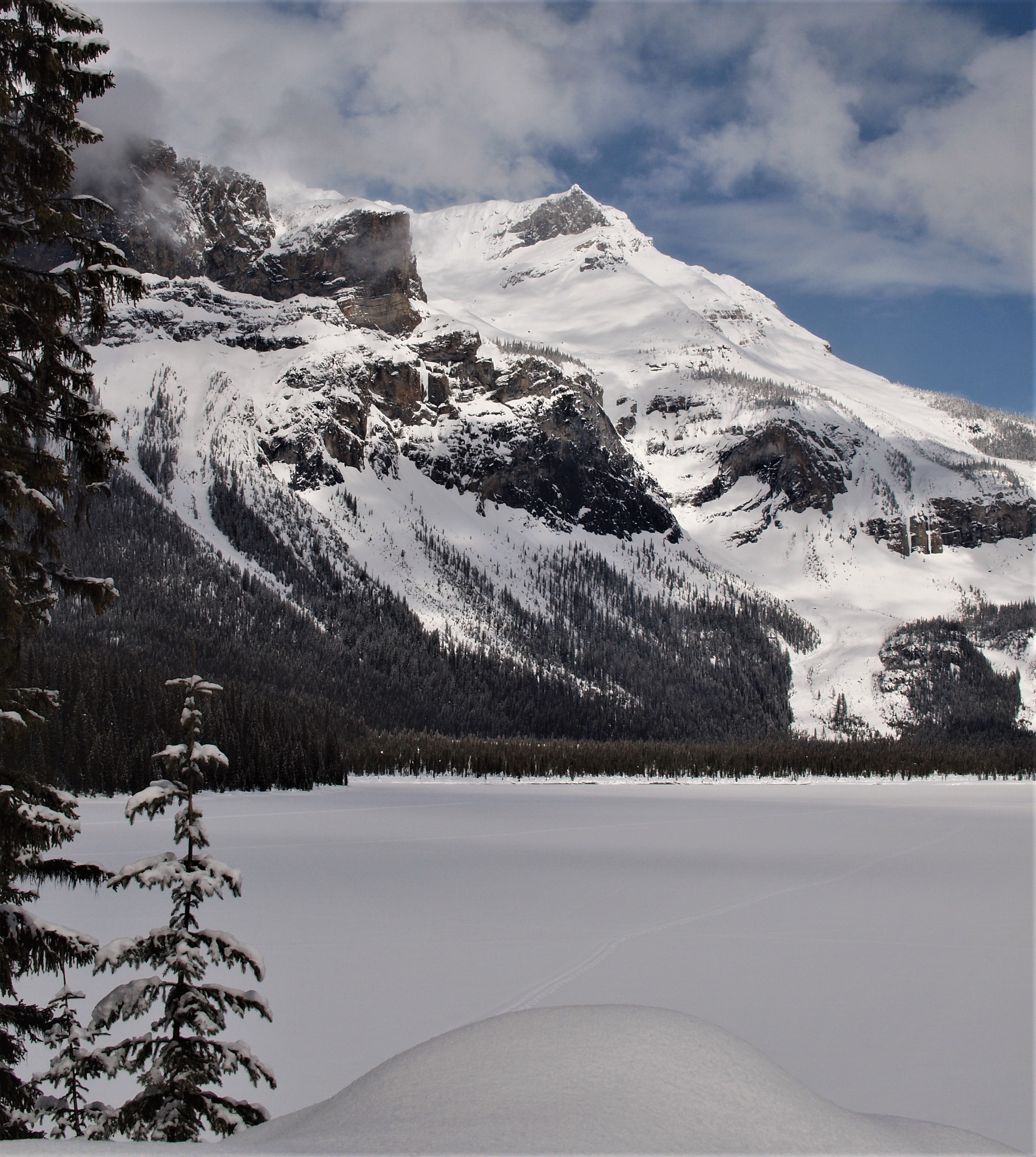
Michael Peak winter scene

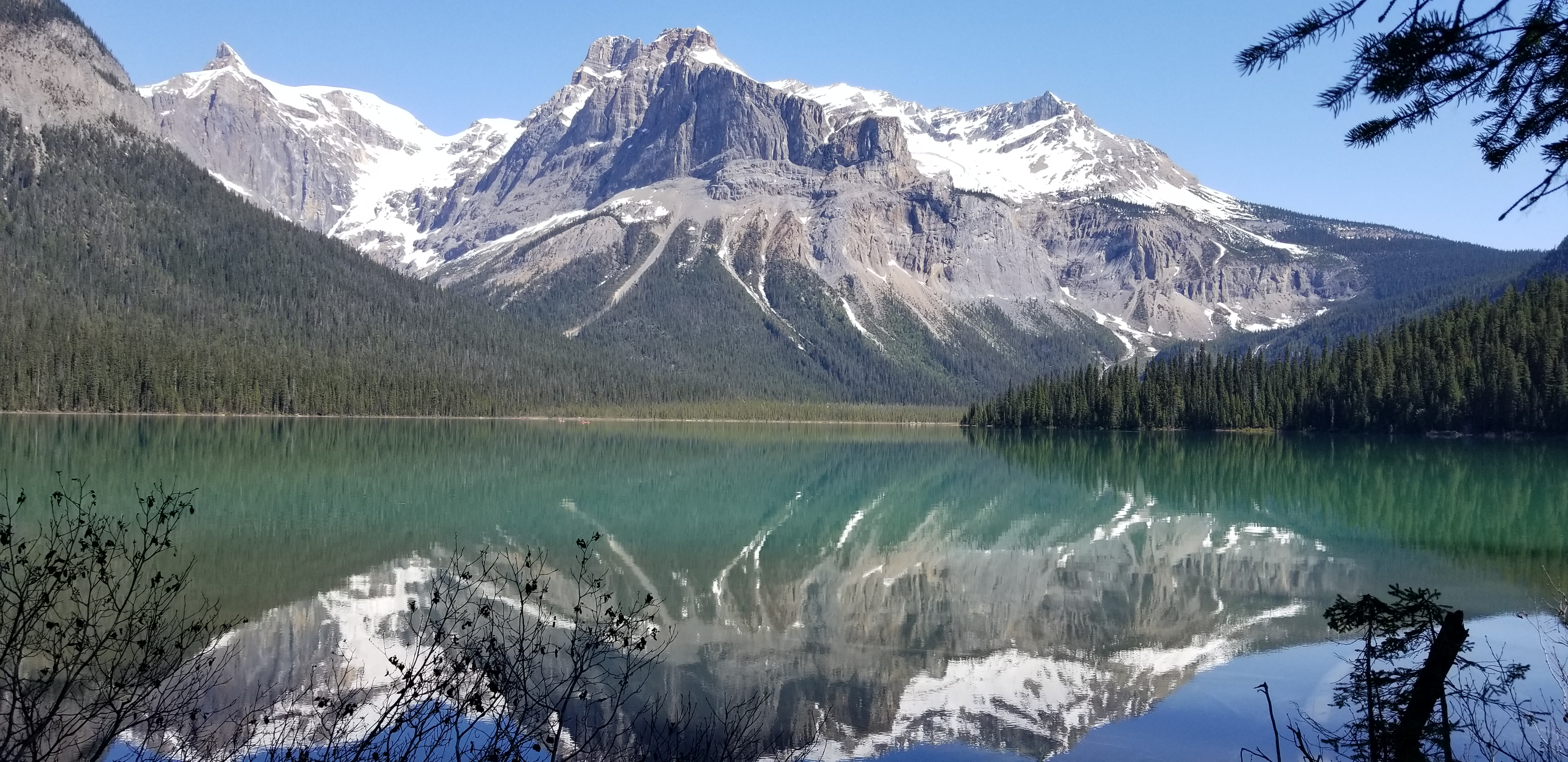
Michael Peak to the right

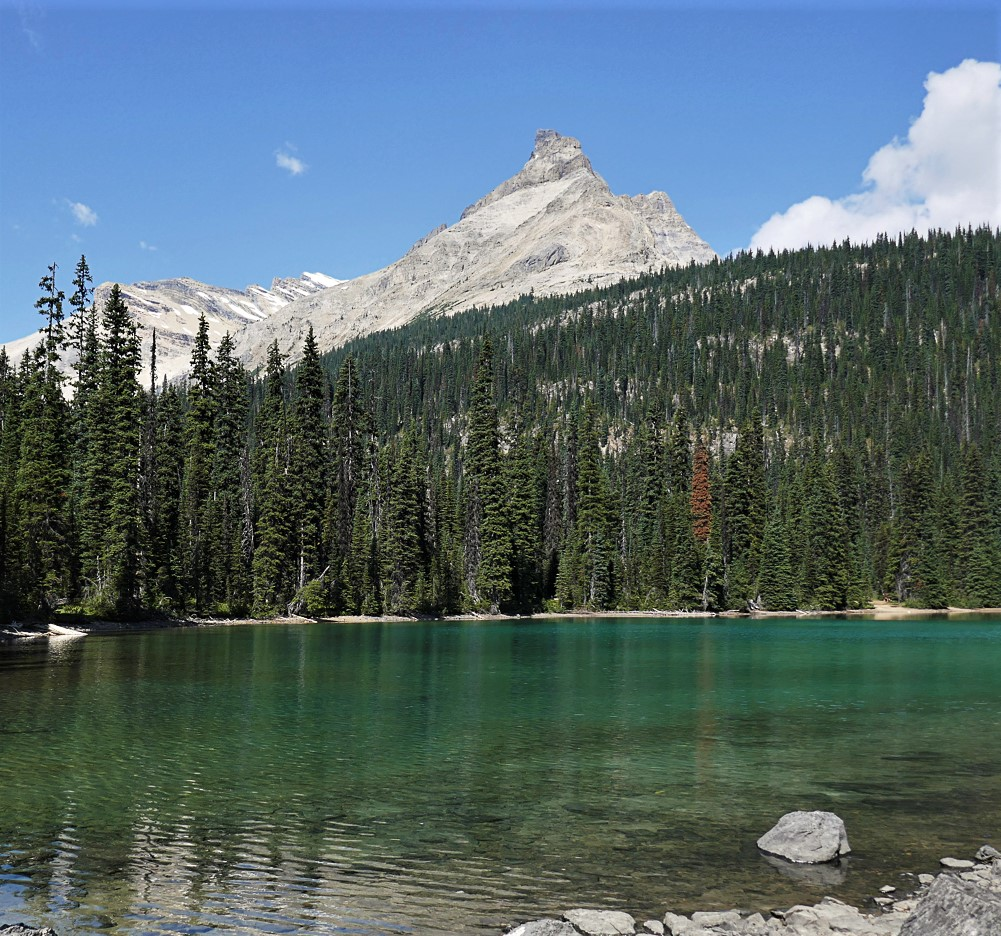
Michael Peak from Yoho Lake

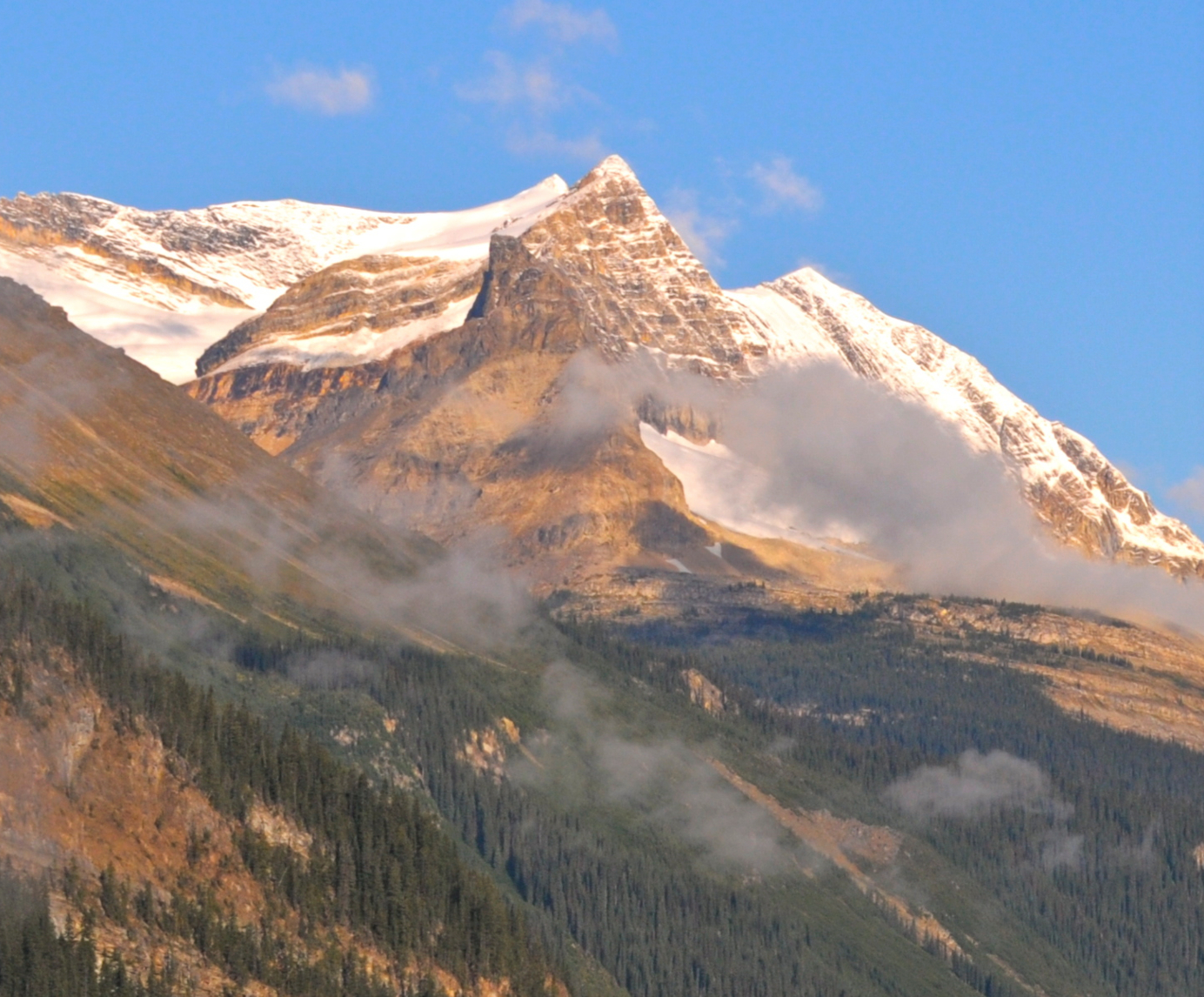
Michael Peak seen from Highway 1

== See also ==
- Geography of British Columbia
