= Grenadians in the United Kingdom =

UK citizens with either full or partial ethnic origins in Granada

Total population
- 9,783 Grenadian-born (2001) * Over 0.01% of the UK's population 30,000 (Grenadian ancestry, 2010)

Regions with significant populations
- London, Birmingham, Leeds, Manchester, Leicester

Languages
- English (British English, Grenadian Creole); French Patois

Religion
- Roman Catholicism; Protestantism

Related ethnic groups
- Afro-Grenadians; Indo-Grenadians; British African-Caribbean people Black British · Black African; Mulatto · Indo-Caribbeans; Amerindian
- * In 2001 only 40.4% of Afro-Caribbeans in the UK were actually born in the Caribbean, 59.6% were born elsewhere (of which 57.9% of the total ethnic groups population was born in the UK)

Grenadians in the United Kingdom are citizens or residents of the United Kingdom whose ethnic origins lie fully or partially in Grenada. 9,783 Grenadian-born people were recorded by the 2001 UK Census.

== Migration from Grenada to the UK ==
Migration has included that of the Windrush Generation; many of the Grenadians who left home as part of this movement settled in Yorkshire.

== People ==
The following is an incomplete list of notable UK residents of Grenadian heritage:

- Joan Anim-Addo, academic, writer and publisher.
- James Baillie, slave owner and merchant.
- Allister Bain, actor and playwright.
- Jean Buffong, writer.
- Hamza Choudhury, footballer.
- Craig David, singer-songwriter.
- Daniel Dubois, heavyweight boxer.
- Jourdan Dunn, model also of Afro-Jamaican and Syrian descent.
- Rhodan Gordon, community activist.
- Lewis Hamilton, racecar driver.
- George Harris, actor.
- Reece James, footballer.
- Lauren James, footballer.
- Fraser James , actor.
- Roger Michael, impresario in London.
- Sam Morris, activist.
- Oliver Norburn, footballer.
- PW, rapper.
- Joyce Vincent, woman whose death went unnoticed for over two years.
- Arthur Wharton, first mixed professional footballer in the UK.
- Verna Wilkins, publisher and author.

Eamonn Walker, actor.

== See also ==
- Black British people
- Mixed (United Kingdom ethnicity category)
- British Indo-Caribbean people
- British African-Caribbean people
- Demographics of Grenada
