= Peter Michael =

Peter Michael may refer to:

- Peter Michael (artist) (born 1972), English painter
- Peter K. Michael, attorney general of Wyoming
- Sir Peter Michael (engineer) (born 1938), British engineer and businessman
- Peter Michael (speed skater) (born 1989), New Zealand athlete
- Peter Michael (footballer) (born 1998), Nigerian footballer

== See also ==
- Michael Peter (1949–1997), field hockey player from West Germany
- Peter Michel (born 1938), German art scholar, publicist and exhibition organizer
- Piotr Michael (born 1988), American actor and comedian
