= William Michael =

William Michael may refer to:

- Willie Michael (1874–1938), Scottish footballer
- William Michaels (1876–1934), American heavyweight boxer
- William B. Michael (1922–2004), US physicist
- Bill Michael (1935–2016), American football player and coach
- Bill Michael (guard) (born 1935), American football

== See also ==
- Michael Williams (disambiguation)
