= Robert Michels (disambiguation) =

Robert Michels (1876–1936), German sociologist.

Robert Michels may also refer to:

- Robert Michels (physician) (born 1936), psychology researcher at Cornell and Columbia Universities

== See also ==
- Robert Michael (disambiguation)
- Robert H. Michel (1923–2017), Illinois congressman and minority leader in the United States House of Representatives
- Robert Michaels, musician
