= Emerald Lake (British Columbia) =

Lake in British Columbia, Canada

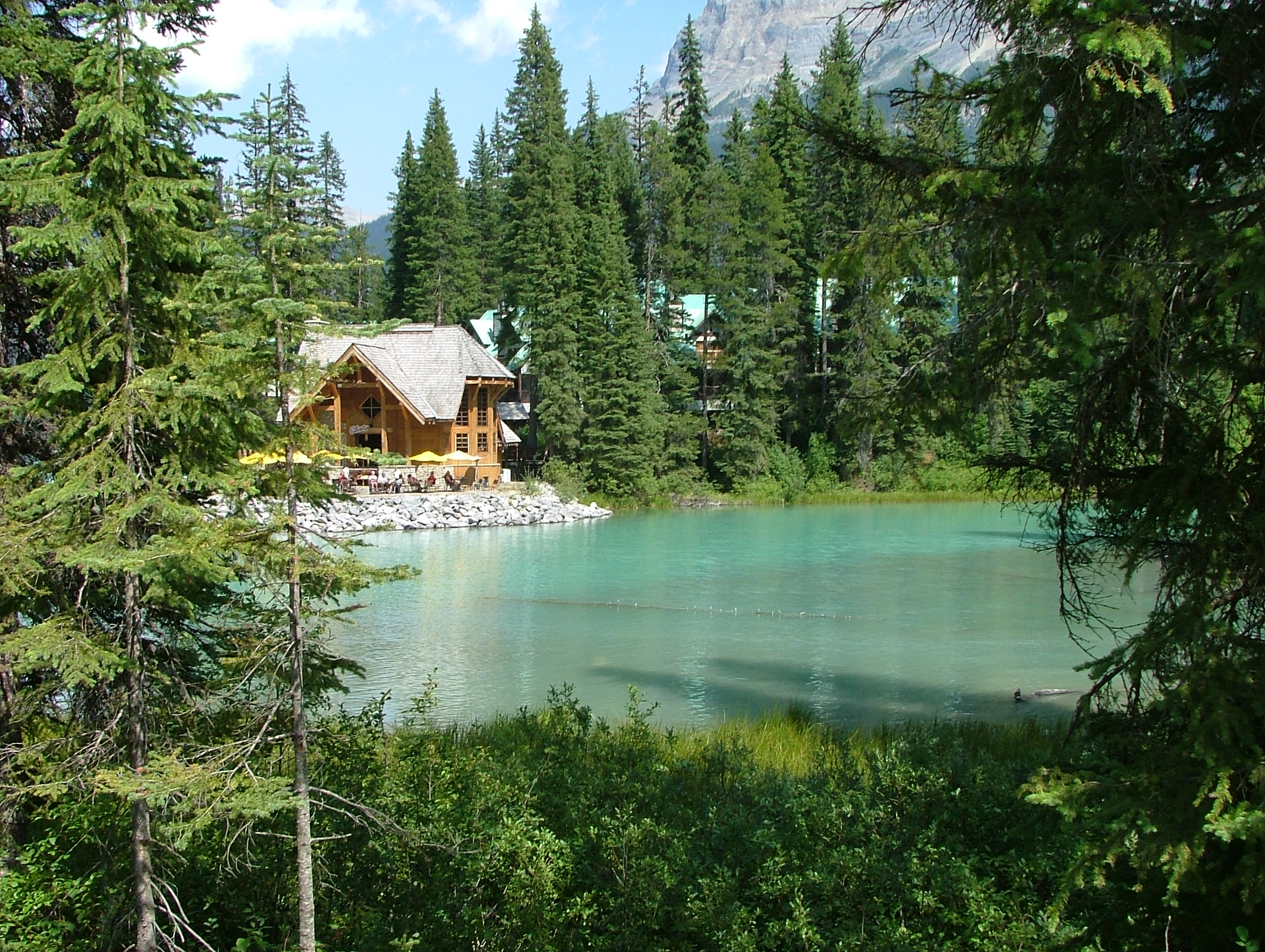
- Emerald Lake Lodge

- Location within British Columbia
- Location: Yoho National Park, British Columbia
- Coordinates: 51.444°N 116.531°W
- Primary outflows: Emerald River
- Basin countries: Canada

Emerald Lake is a freshwater lake in Yoho National Park, British Columbia, Canada. Yoho National Park is one of the four contiguous national parks in Canada's Rocky Mountains, along the boundary of British Columbia and Alberta Provinces.

== Nearby features ==
A two-lane paved road about 9 km / 6 miles long connects the Trans-Canada Highway with Emerald Lake. A 5.2 km (3.2 mi) hiking trail circuits the lake. Other more advanced hiking trails go in different directions up into the mountains.

The railway and timber town of Golden is the nearest town to Emerald Lake outside the park boundaries. It is about 50 km / 30 miles to the west. The small railway village of Field is in Yoho Park near the highway exit to Emerald Lake, and has a park-operated visitor center.

== Wildlife ==
Many wild animals and birds live in the area and are protected by park law. Steller's jay are common around Emerald Lake. Grizzly bears and American black bears are also fairly common.

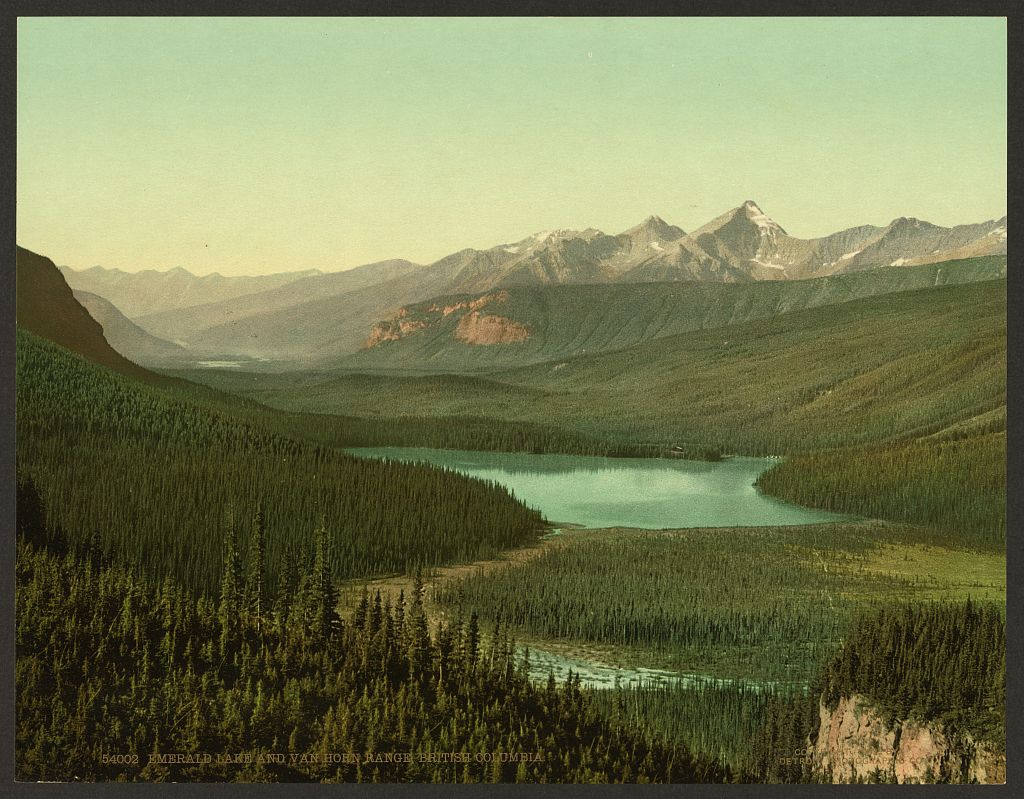
Emerald Lake and Van Horne Range, c. 1902

== Surrounding geographical features ==
Emerald Lake is enclosed by mountains of the President Range, named after the President and Vice-President of the coast to coast Canadian Pacific Railway, built in 1885 and which runs through Yoho National Park. Other peaks are Mount Burgess and Wapta Mountain. The Emerald Basin opens to the west and traps rain and snow storms, causing frequent rain in summer and heavy snowfalls in winter. This influx of moisture works with the lake's elevation of 1200 metres / 4400 feet above sea level to produce a unique selection of flora. Trees found here are more typical of B.C.'s wet interior forests of the Columbia Mountains immediately to the west, such as western red cedar, western yew, western hemlock and western white pine. The alluvial fan on the northeast shore produces wildflowers in abundance during late June and early July.

== Climate ==
Brief snowstorms, which usually melt in a few days, occasionally occur at valley level in June or September due to the latitude of 53 degrees and the generally high elevation. Daytime temperatures in June or September average 20 C / 70 F, in July and August it can reach as high as 33 C / 90 F. Winter temperatures December to March are always below freezing, averaging -15 C / 0 F and sometimes down to -30 C / -30 F. Snowfall is usually substantial, about 1 metre / 3 feet or more of snow stays at lake level in winter, increasing with altitude to 10 metres / 30 feet or more on the mountain tops.

Due to its 53 degree latitude and moderately high altitude, the lake is frozen from November until late April or early May. The vivid green colour of the water is caused by powdered rock from the glaciers, which reflects the blue-green spectrum of sunlight. The rock type and the amount of it in the water causes the colour to vary from lake to lake and month to month, even week to week.

== Human interaction ==
=== Naming ===
The first non-indigenous person to set sight on Emerald Lake was Canadian guide Tom Wilson, who stumbled upon it by accident in 1882. A string of his horses had gotten away, and it was while tracking them that he first entered the valley. The lake had an impression on him: "For a few moments I sat [on] my horse and enjoyed the rare, peaceful beauty of the scene." It was Wilson who gave the lake its name because of its remarkable colour, which due to a different rock type producing the sediment that is suspended in the glacial water, reflects the green spectrum of sunlight rather than the blue spectrum seen in Moraine, Hector, Bow and Peyto Lakes in neighboring Banff National Park. However, this was not the first time Wilson had named a lake 'Emerald'. Earlier that same year he had discovered another lake which he had given the same name, and that name appeared briefly on the official map. This first lake was shortly renamed Lake Louise.

== Gallery ==
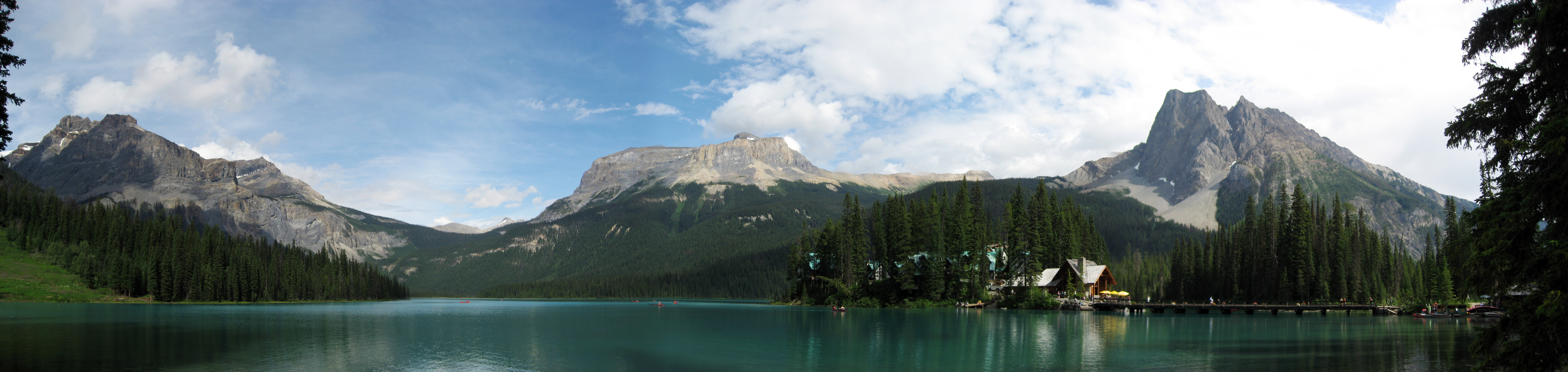
Emerald Lake panorama with Michael Peak, Wapta Mountain, and Mount Burgess
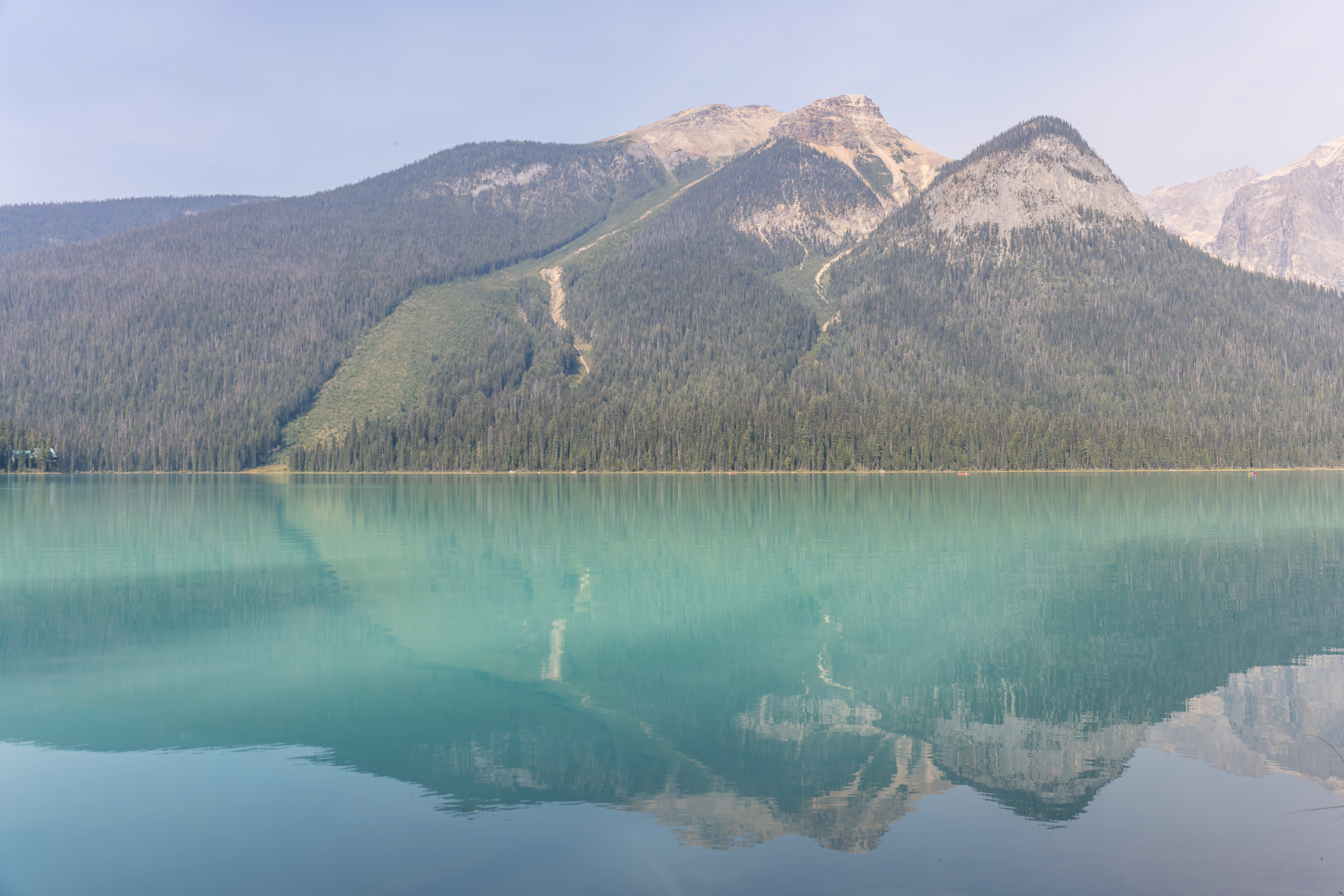

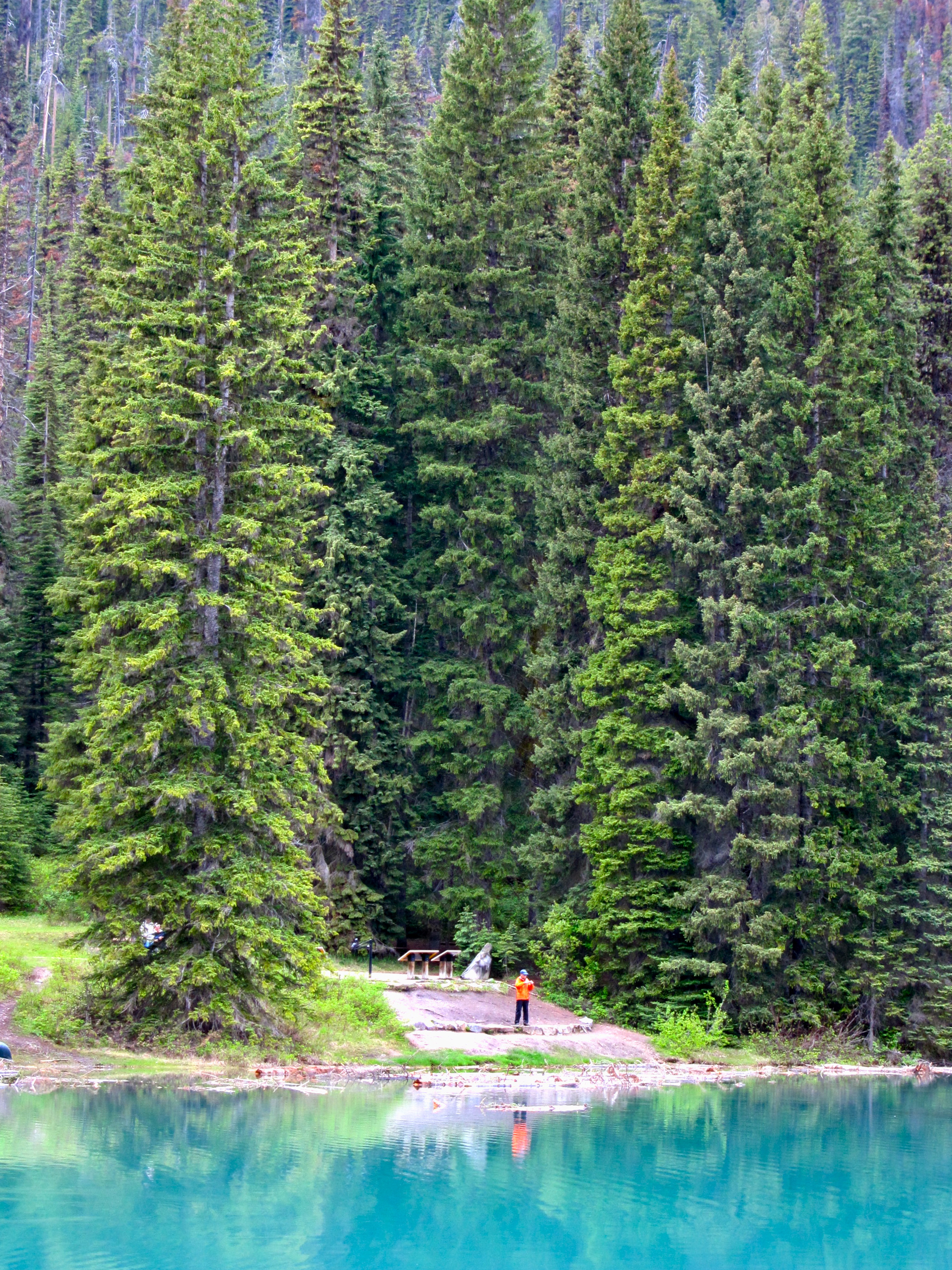

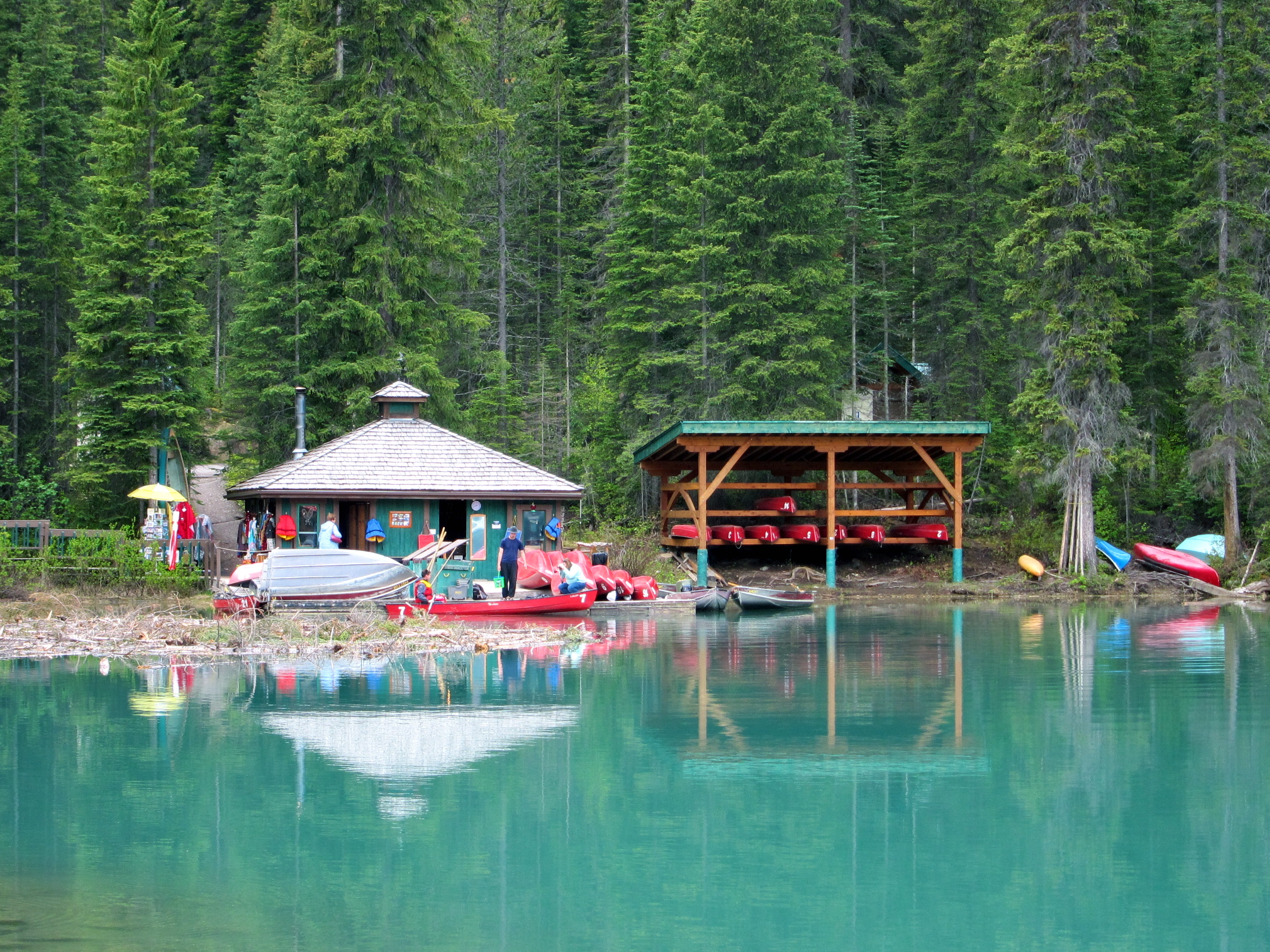

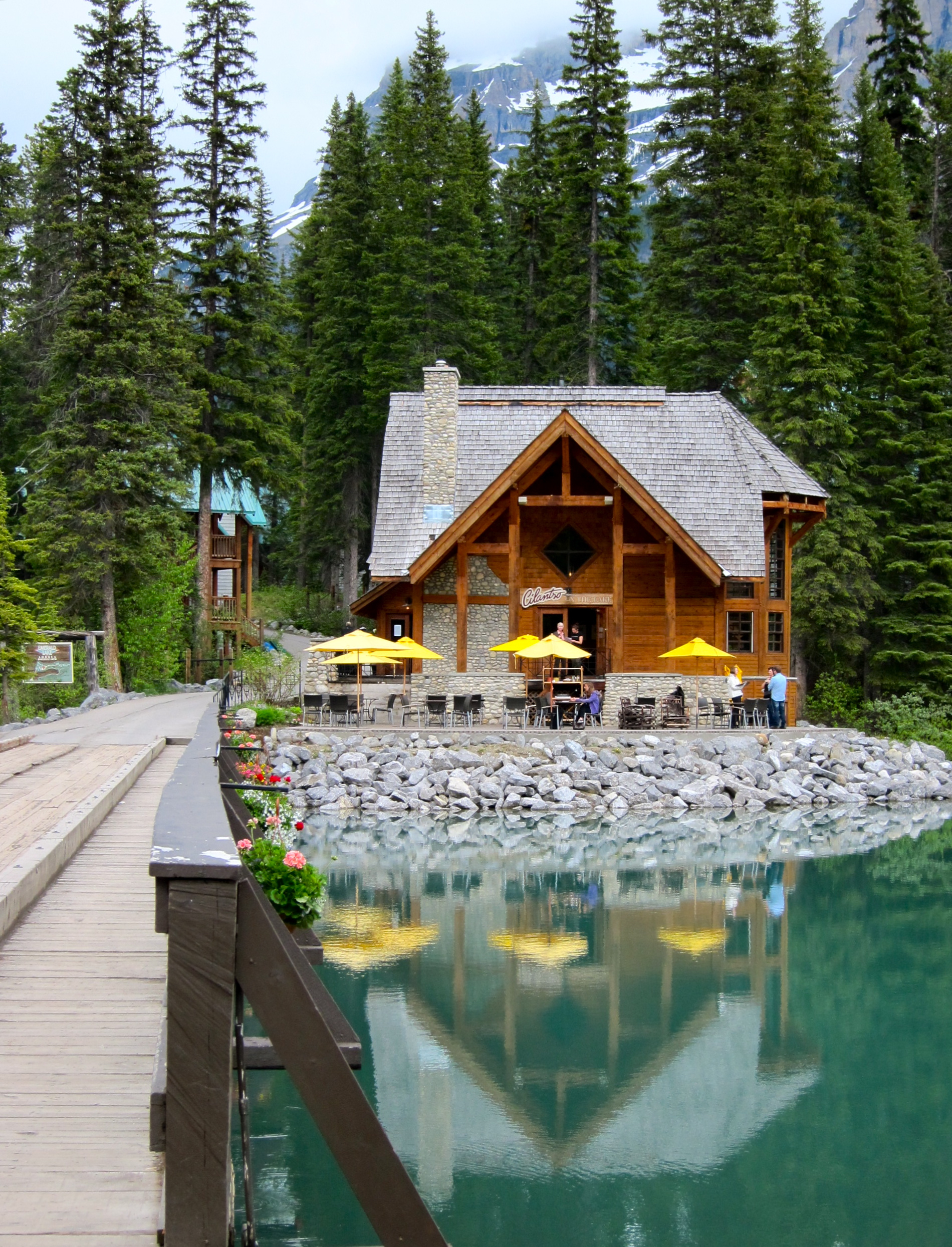

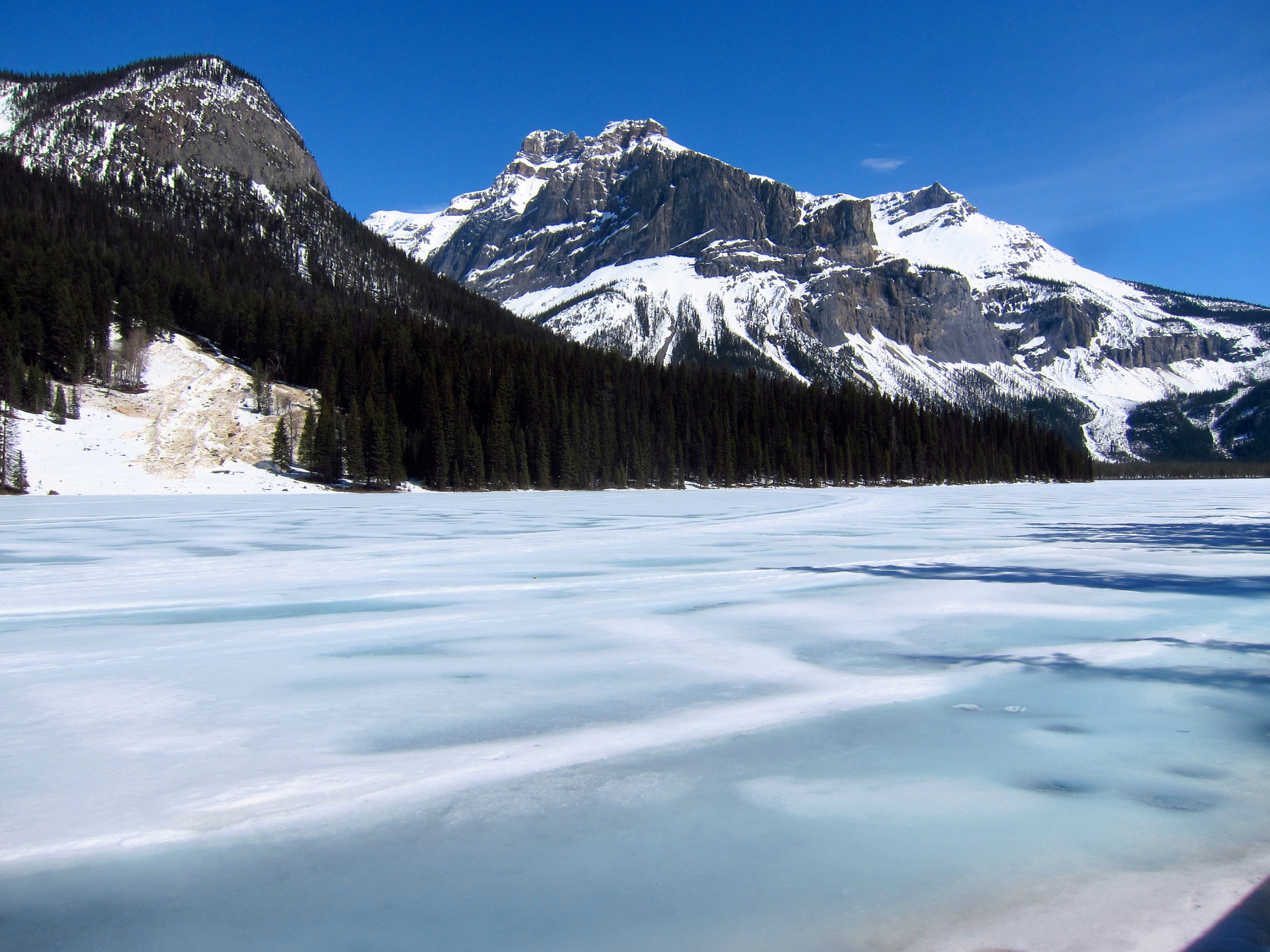

== See also ==
- List of lakes in Yoho National Park
