= Alan Michael =

Alan Michael may refer to:

- Alan Michael Braufman (born 1951), American jazz saxophonist, flutist and composer
- Alan Michael (artist) (born 1967), Scottish artist
- Alan Michael (musician) (born 1970), Polish-Dutch singer, songwriter and record producer

== See also ==
- Alun Michael (born 1943), Welsh politician
