= Bill Peyto =

English-Canadian pioneer

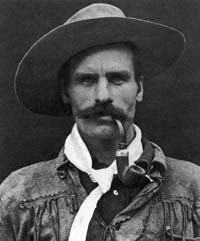
- Born: Ebenezer William Peyto; 14 February 1869; Welling, Kent, England
- Died: 23 March 1943 (aged 74); Calgary, Alberta, Canada
- Occupation(s): Park warden, mountain guide
- Spouses: Emily Wood (m. 1902; died 1906) Ethel Wells (m. 1921; died 1940)
- Children: 1 son

Ebenezer William Peyto (/ˈpiːtoʊ/ PEE-toh; 14 February 1869 – 23 March 1943) was an English-Canadian pioneer, mountain guide, and early park warden of Banff National Park.

== Life and career ==
Peyto was born in Welling, Kent in 1869 and immigrated to Canada, settling in Calgary in February 1887. He found his way to the Canadian Rocky Mountains where he initially worked as a railway labourer. By the mid-1890s Peyto had built a small log cabin close to the Bow River where he kept his outfitting and trapping gear. Peyto eventually found work as a mountain guide under Tom Wilson, and led early expeditions to attempt to climb Mount Assiniboine, including once with James Outram in the 1890s. He was also chosen to lead Edward Whymper to Vermilion Pass.

Peyto enlisted to serve in Lord Strathcona's Horse Regiment during the Boer War in 1899, and during World War I in Belgium and France with the Twelfth Mounted Regiment and Machine Gun Brigade. He was wounded in his right leg at the Battle of Ypres.

Peyto worked as a park warden in the Banff National Park from 1913 until his retirement in 1937.

== Death and legacy ==
Peyto married Emily Wood in 1902; she died in 1906. He later married Ethel Wells, a native of Lewes, Sussex, England, in 1921. She died in 1940.

Bill Peyto died from cancer on 23 March 1943 in Calgary, Alberta and was buried at the Banff Town Cemetery. At the time of his death, he was survived by one son, Robert. Two brothers, Walter and Sam Peyto, also lived in Banff.

A large photograph of Peyto prominently marks the entrance to the town of Banff, Alberta. Peyto Glacier on the Continental Divide and Peyto Lake are named in his honour.
