= Avi Jacob =

American singer-songwriter

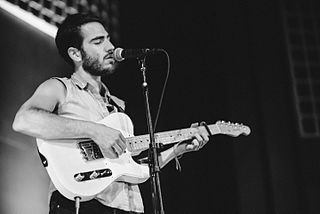
- Avi Jacob performing at CMJ Festival 2015

Background information
- Born: Dartmouth, Massachusetts
- Origin: Charleston, South Carolina, Boston, Massachusetts
- Genres: Folk, Americana, soul
- Occupation: Singer-songwriter
- Instruments: Vocals, guitar
- Years active: 2014–present
- Label: Skate Mountain Records
- Website: avijacob.bandcamp.com

Avi Jacob is an American singer-songwriter originally from Dartmouth, Massachusetts.

== Life and career ==
Avi was born into a Jewish family in Dartmouth, Massachusetts. His father, historian Robert Michael, is the author of several books about the Holocaust. Jacob left home in his teen years to live in Boston. He spent the next several years developing skills as a songwriter and performer. While living in Boston, he was involved in the DIY music community The Whitehaus Family Record and released several amateur recordings with them. Jacob moved to Charleston, South Carolina in 2010 and began to focus on his professional career in music by playing small music festivals, and being featured in music blogs and samplers. Avi is a writer of the Diana DeMuth song "All the Liars" released in 2020

He unofficially released the song "Cannonball" in 2014 on social media.

In December 2015, he was brought to CMJ by the band Counting Crows who named him the best folk emerging superstar. He opened for Dr John in February 2016.

In March 2016, Avi was featured on A&R Report as an artist to watch.

Avi recorded his EP Surrender with Simone Felice (producer of the Billboard #1 Lumineers album Cleopatra) and members of the Felice Brothers.

In May 2020 Avi released a new album, Preservation, via Bandcamp.

Jacob is an independent artist, formerly signed to Skate Mountain Records, and related to popular ghost-folk songwriter Allysen Callery.

== Influences ==
Avi is most influenced by Nirvana, Paul Simon, Lauryn Hill, Bob Dylan, Leonard Cohen, and Prince.

== Discography ==
=== EPs ===
- So Hard To Reach You (2014)
- Surrender (2018)
- Preservation (2020)

=== Singles ===
- "New England" (2017)
- "Pickup Truck" (2018)

== Other sources ==
- Jason Grishkoff (February 21, 2016). "Listen Avi Jacob". indieshuffle.com.
- Karla Harris (March 5, 2016). "Avi Jacob single review". whenthehornblows.blogspot.co.uk.
- "Avi Jacob review". indietrendsetters.com. March 7, 2016.
- "article". independentclauses.com.
- "Avi Jacob – Cannonball".*
- "Avi Jacob – Fool Hearted Man".
- "Robert Michael (historian)".
- "Preservation EP Review".
- "Preservation Review".
