= Robert Michael =

Robert Michael may refer to:

- Robert Michael (footballer) (1879–1963), Australian footballer for Collingwood
- Robert T. Michael, founding dean of the Harris School of Public Policy Studies at University of Chicago
- Robert Michael (historian) (1936–2010), professor of history
- Robert Michael Lewis (1909–1997), American actor
- Robert and Michael Bever, American brothers who were convicted of murdering their parents and 3 siblings

== See also ==
- Robert H. Michel (1923–2017), pronounced Robert Michael, Illinois politician
- Robert Michels (disambiguation)
