= Rescue 807 crashes =

1986 aviation incidents in Canada

The Rescue 807 crashes were three related aircraft accidents in Kananaskis Country, Alberta, Canada on 6 and 14 June 1986. Two aircraft crashed on separate days while searching for the first aircraft. All 13 people on board the three aircraft were killed and subsequently three mountain lakes were named Memorial Lakes in remembrance of those who lost their lives.

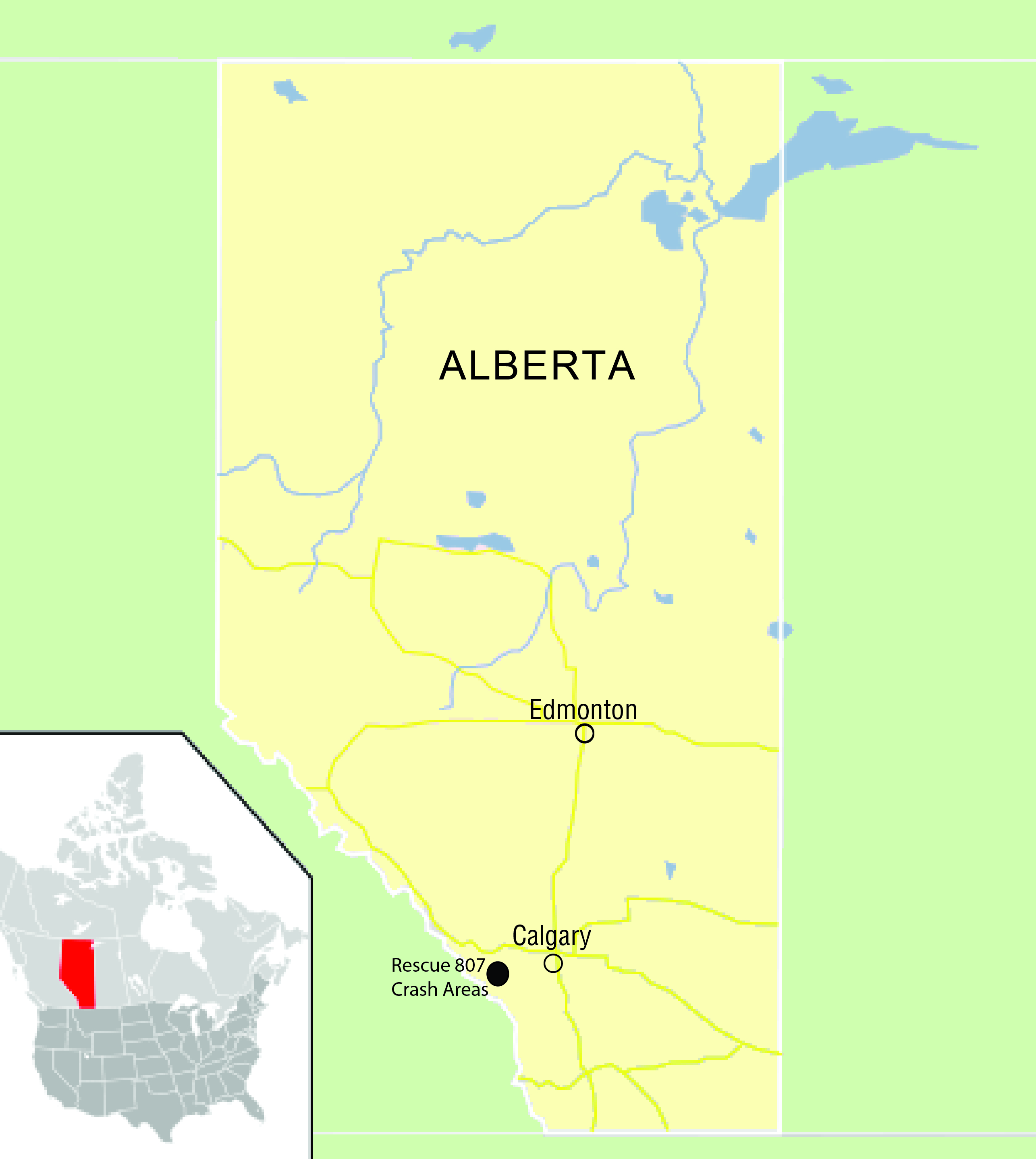
Map of Alberta, Canada depicting the location of the Rescue 807 crashes in relation to the major cities.

== The first crash ==
A Cessna 182-R (some sources say Cessna 185) piloted by Ken Wolff was transporting Orval Pall, a wildlife biologist, over the Kananaskis Country, part of the Rocky Mountains on 6 June 1986 as part of a project monitoring bighorn sheep. The nearby city of Calgary had been chosen to host the 1988 Winter Olympics and efforts were under way to track the Games' impact on Mount Allan (Nakiska). The plane crashed on a forested slope of Mount Kidd and was difficult to find due to being broken into pieces and scattered beneath the canopy. The pilot's friends began searching within hours of the plane's disappearance.

== The second crash ==
Shortly after Wolff's plane was reported missing, a search effort was hastily started by air. A Cessna 185 piloted by Bruce Pratt with two spotters crashed soon thereafter into Mount Lougheed, killing all three. Like the first plane, no one saw the plane crash, so it was unknown if any passengers survived.

== The search for the first two crashes ==
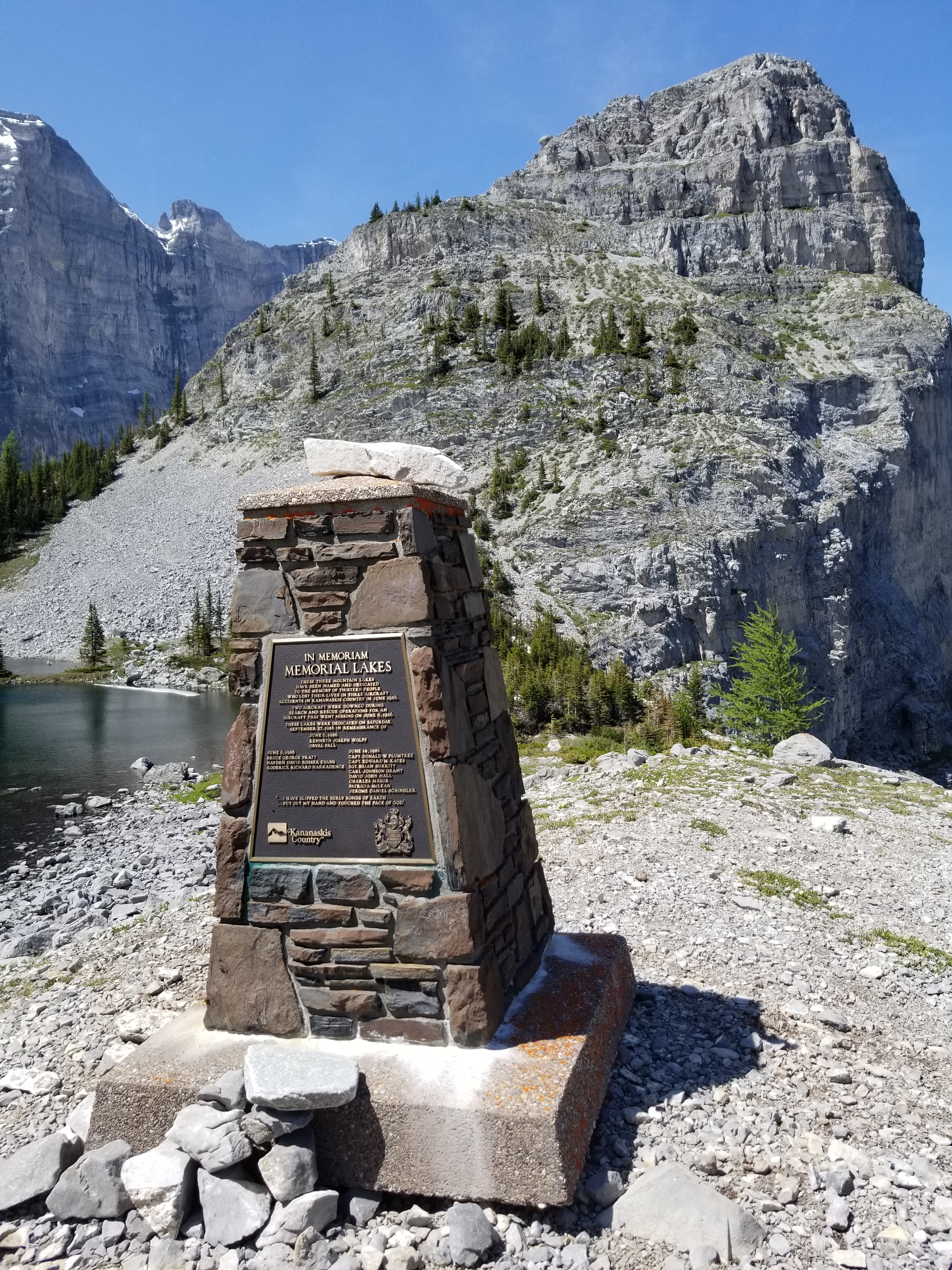
Stone Cairn Memorial for Rescue 807 Crashes

Several agencies formed search groups on both the ground and in the air to find the two missing planes. The Canadian Air Force also joined the search and rescue operations with multiple aircraft. Hundreds of volunteers also searched on the ground. Foul weather hampered search efforts, but on 9 June the plane piloted by Bruce Pratt was found.

== The third crash, Twin Otter 807 ==
At 14:52 (MDT) on 14 June, eight days after the first two aircraft went down, a Canadian Armed Forces de Havilland Canada DHC-6 Twin Otter with 8 people on board crashed, "starting a small forest fire" and killing its occupants.

The accident was caused by an illusion where the sun's high angle and lack of shadow on the terrain caused the pilot to perceive the mountain to be deceptively far away.

== Aftermath ==
Ken Wolff and Orval Pall were found on 18 June 1986. They had not survived the crash.

The three lakes in the area were re-named "Memorial Lakes" by the Government of Alberta and a cairn commemorating the crashes was installed next to the highest-altitude lake.
