= Michael James (writer) =

British writer, educator and illustrator

Michael James is the pseudonym of a British writer, educator and illustrator. He fictionalised his experiences as a teacher in That'll Teach You!. The novel describes a fictionalised incident of alleged misconduct and its consequences. Researching Sex and Lies in the Classroom: Allegations of Sexual Misconduct in Schools characterises the novel as "a revenge text", because of the way in which some characters are depicted.

== Books ==
- James, Michael (2005). Nanny. Recognition. ISBN 0-9537373-1-4.
- James, Michael (1999). That'll Teach You!. Recognition. ISBN 0-9537373-0-6.
