= John Michael =

John Michael may refer to:

- John Michael (darts player) (born 1974), Greek-Cypriot darts player
- John Michael (politician), American politician
- John Michael (broadcaster) (born 1972), American sports broadcaster

== See also ==
- Jack Michael (1926–2020), researcher, professor and author
- John Michaels (1907–1996), pitcher in Major League Baseball
