= Juliet Raphael Michael =

South Sudanese politician

Minister of Physical Infrastructure
- Incumbent
- Assumed office 18 May 2010

Personal details
- Citizenship: South Sudanese
- Occupation: Politician

Juliet Raphael Michael is a South Sudanese politician. She has served as Minister of Physical Infrastructure of Western Bahr el Ghazal since 18 May 2010.
