= Arthur Michael =

American chemist

Arthur Michael (August 7, 1853 – February 8, 1942) was an American organic chemist who is best known for the Michael reaction.

== Life ==
Arthur Michael was born into a wealthy family in Buffalo, New York on August 7, 1853, the son of John and Clara Michael, well-off real-estate investors. He was educated in that same city, learning chemistry both from a local teacher and in his own homebuilt laboratory. An illness thwarted Michael's plans to attend Harvard, and instead in 1871 he traveled to Europe with his parents and decided to study in Germany.

He studied in Hofmann's chemical laboratory in Berlin at the University of Berlin, he studied with Robert Bunsen at Heidelberg University and after 2 years again in Berlin with Hofmann. He then studied for another year with Wurtz at the École de Médecine in Paris and with Dmitri Mendeleev in St. Petersburg.

Returning to the United States in 1880, Michael became professor of chemistry at Tufts College where he taught from 1882 to 1889. He received an A. M. degree from Tufts in 1882, and a Ph.D. in 1890. At Tufts College, Michael met and married, in 1888, one of his own science students, Helen Cecilia De Silver Abbott. Following several years in England, during which the couple worked in a self-constructed laboratory on the Isle of Wight, they returned to the United States in 1894 where Arthur Michael again taught at Tufts, leaving in 1907 as an emeritus professor.

Michael's retirement from academia lasted but five years. In 1912 he became a professor of chemistry at Harvard University, and there he stayed until a second retirement, in 1936. Throughout his career, Michael worked with some of the foremost chemists of his day, obtained chemistry professorships, and achieved fame among his peers.

Arthur Michael died on February 8, 1942, at the age of 88, in Orlando, Florida. His wife died in 1904. They had no children.

== Work ==
Arthur Michael is remembered today primarily for the Michael reaction, also called the Michael addition. As originally defined by Michael, the reaction involves the combination of an enolate ion of a ketone or aldehyde to an α,β-unsaturated carbonyl compound at the β carbon.

Michael was also well known in his day for incorporating thermodynamic concepts into organic chemistry, particularly for his use of entropy arguments. Perhaps his most enduring contribution to science was his central role in introducing the European model of graduate education into the United States.

== Activities and honors ==
- National Academy of Sciences (1889)

Arthur Michael is credited with the 1897 first ascents of Mount Lefroy and Mount Victoria in the Canadian Rockies along with J. Norman Collie, also a fellow professor of organic chemistry. Michael Peak was named by his friend Edward Whymper in 1901 in his honor.
