= Ian Michael =

Ian Michael may refer to:

- Ian Lockie Michael (1915–2014), British academic
- Ian David Lewis Michael (1936–2020), British academic and crime novelist
