= Thomas Edmonds Wilson =

Canadian guide

Tom Wilson
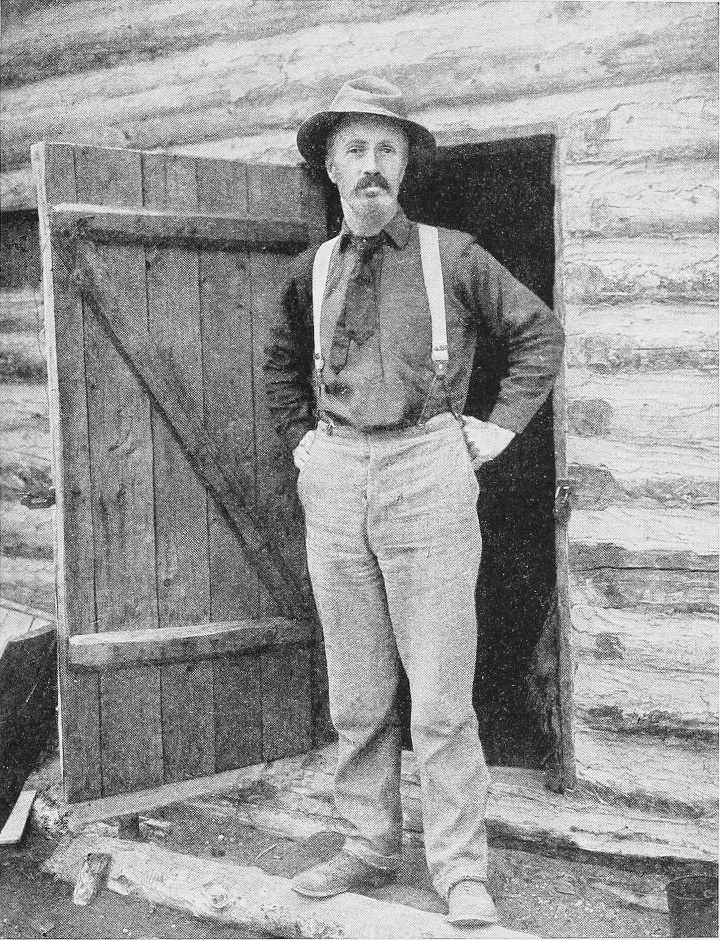
- Wilson c. 1907
- Born: August 21, 1859; Canada West, Province of Canada
- Died: September 20, 1933 (aged 74); Banff, Alberta, Canada
- Occupations: Outfitter and guide
- Years active: 1881–1904
- Spouse: Minnie McDougall (m. 1865)
- Children: 6

Thomas Edmonds Wilson (August 21, 1859 – September 20, 1933) was a Canadian outfitter and guide.

== Early life ==
Wilson was born in Canada West, and graduated from grammar school in Barrie, Ontario, in 1875. In October 1878 he enrolled in the Ontario Agricultural College in Guelph and joined the Volunteer Militia Field Battery of Ontario, made up of OAC students. He left the college in 1879, possibly without graduating.

== Prominence ==
Tom Wilson's outfitting and guiding career began in 1881 with his volunteering to be the personal attendant to explorer A.B. Rogers. As history was written, Wilson became familiar with the area west of Calgary, Alberta; and hence became the primary backcountry outfitter. Tom Wilson hired good people and was known to initially employ other notable back country guides such as Bill Peyto, Jimmy Simpson, Billy Warren, Sidney Unwin, Phil Stephens and others. He outfitted many notable explorers one of which was Mary Schäffer.

== Travels ==
He initially travelled west via Fort Benton, Montana, United States. He joined the North-West Mounted Police (NWMP) and was stationed at Fort Walsh, Saskatchewan Sept. 22, 1880. He was assigned to monitor Sitting Bull (Ta-tanka I-yotank), who had relocated to Canada after the Battle of the Little Bighorn. He resigned in 1881 and joined a survey party seeking a route for the Canadian Pacific Railway through the Rocky Mountains. He guided Major A.B. Rogers to the discovery of the Rogers Pass. In 1882 his own indigenous guide Edwin Hunter led him to what was known to indigenous peoples as the lake of little fishes and is now known as Lake Louise and named it "Emerald Lake". The named lasted until 1884 when the name "Emerald Lake" was changed to Lake Louise in honour of Princess Louise, Duchess of Argyll, wife of the governor general, John Campbell, 9th Duke of Argyll, or Marquess of Lorne.

Wilson and his guide Edwin Hunter continued their travels and upon seeing a second beautiful "Emerald Lake" in 1882; where the name stuck. This lake is 39 km West of Lake Louise on Hwy 1 and is in Yoho National Park, British Columbia. Emerald Lake is near Field, British Columbia and is a popular destination resort for hikers and wilderness camping.

In 1883, Wilson established his business at Banff, Lake Louise and Field, British Columbia.

== Family life ==
In 1885 he married Minnie McDougall, 1865–1936, of Owen Sound, Ontario; and established a guiding and outfitting business in Morley, Alberta on the Stoney First Nations reserve. The Wilsons had six children, Thomas Edmonds "Ed", 1898–1979, John Clark, 1888–1932, Adelaide Ann "Ada", 1886-1967?, Rene, ?-1968, Bessie (Dier) and Dora Burrell (McRitchie), 1898–1963.

== Guiding and outfitting ==
In 1893 he moved his backcountry outfitting business to Banff, Alberta and then sold it in 1904. Subsequently, Tom Wilson operated a horse ranch at Kootenay Plains. Tom Wilson was a noted explorer and guide and is credited with discovering Lake Louise, Alberta and blazing the trail to Mt. Assiniboine.

== Tributes ==
Mount Wilson, in Banff, and Wilson Road, in Calgary, Ab. are named for him. See Trail Blazer of the Canadian Rockies / Thomas Edmonds Wilson.
