= Helen Abbott Michael =

American chemist (1857–1904)

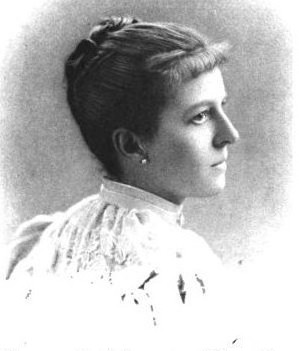
- Born: December 23, 1857; Philadelphia, Pennsylvania, U.S.
- Died: November 29, 1904 (aged 46); Boston, Massachusetts, U.S.
- Resting place: Laurel Hill Cemetery, Philadelphia, Pennsylvania, U.S.
- Occupations: Chemist, physician
- Spouse: Arthur Michael

Helen Cecilia De Silver Abbott Michael (December 23, 1857 – November 29, 1904) was an American chemist and a pioneer in phytochemistry. She documented the relationship between chemical composition and plant morphology and proposed a chemical taxonomy for plants. She was the first woman to lecture to students at the Philadelphia College of Pharmacy. She published several scientific papers and gave lectures to the American Association for the Advancement of Science meeting, the Franklin Institute, the Academy of Natural Sciences and the Smithsonian Institution. She received a medical degree from Tufts University School of Medicine and transformed her house in Boston into a free hospital for the poor, however she died from influenza contracted from one of her patients. She was married to organic chemist Arthur Michael.

== Early life and education ==
Helen Cecilia De Silver Abbott was born in Philadelphia on December 23, 1857, to James Abbott and Caroline Montelius. She was educated at home with private tutors and studied piano in Paris. She performed in a concert on the Isle of Wight in 1878 that received positive reviews. Arabella Goddard recommended she become a professional piano player and offered to personally instruct her.

In 1881, while in Paris, Michael purchased and read a used copy of Hermann von Helmholtz's Handbuch der Physiologischen Optik which sparked her interest in science. She expanded her areas of scientific interest beyond optics to include anatomy, medicine and zoology. Her first cousin, William Louis Abbott, was an explorer and naturalist whose collection of furs, skins, birds and plants contributed to multiple museums.

In the fall of 1882, Michael studied at the Women's Medical College of Pennsylvania. However, during her second year, she withdrew from the school due to injuries obtained when she fainted during observation of a medical procedure and struck her head on a marble hearth. While recovering, she became interested in the chemical properties of plants after reading about an incident in which children ingested poisonous roots that they mistakenly thought were wild carrots.

== Chemistry career ==
From 1884 to 1888, Michael conducted research along with Professors Henry Trimble and Samuel Philip Sadtler at the Philadelphia College of Pharmacy. She published two original research papers, one On Haemotoxylin in the Bark of Saraca indica and another On the Occurrence of Solid Hydrocarbons in Plants. The Trustees of the school were impressed with her work and allowed her to lecture to students, the first woman permitted in the school's history. They also funded a new research laboratory with a section for female researchers.

In August 1884, Michael presented her research to the American Association for the Advancement of Science meeting in Philadelphia. She also presented her research to large audiences at the Franklin Institute and the Academy of Natural Sciences in Philadelphia. In Washington D.C., she was allowed access to the government greenhouses for research after a presentation at the Philosophical and Anthropological and Biological Societies at the United States National Museum.

During the summer of 1887, Michael traveled throughout the European continent to visit with many accomplished scientists. She visited laboratories and institutions in Sweden, Switzerland, Germany, and Britain. The scientists received Helen due to the letter of introduction she had in her possession from Samuel Pierpont Langley, secretary of the Smithsonian Institution.

Michael moved to Boston and conducted research with Professor Arthur Michael of Tufts University, whom she married in June 1888. In 1890, Arthur accepted a position of director of the Chemical Laboratory at Clark University in Worcester, Massachusetts. In 1891, Helen and Arthur moved to the English coastal town of Bonchurch on the Isle of Wight for four years and conducted chemical research in a private, self-equipped laboratory. Helen's work from this laboratory produced four published papers regarding synthetic organic chemistry.

In 1895, the Michaels' returned to the United States and Arthur returned to Tufts University. Helen began studying the stereochemistry of sugar molecules. In 1895, she gave a presentation before the Franklin Institute on a review of synthetic work of sugars She determined the chemical composition of Yucca angustifolia and documented the relationship between chemical composition and plant morphology.

Michael proposed that plant evolution could be traced through plant chemistry and that similar species of plants could be identified through similar chemical compounds. She conducted research on glucosides and their role throughout a plant's development. She also determined that saponin is a glucoside and its presence in plants placed it in the "saponin group". Michael predicted in a lecture on "Plant Analysis as an Applied Science" that chemists of the future would be able to produce, through synthetic means, the proteins, sugars, and starches needed in the human diet.

== Medical career ==
Michael entered Tufts University School of Medicine in 1900, and graduated with a M.D. degree in June 1903.

Along with another female physician, she transformed her house into a free hospital for the treatment of the poor. She died in Boston on November 29, 1904, due to influenza contracted from one of her patients. She was interred at Laurel Hill Cemetery in Philadelphia.

== Publications ==
- Comparative Chemistry of Higher and Lower Plants, J.B. Lippincott Company, Philadelphia, 1887
- Plant Analysis as an Applied Science, Franklin Institute, Philadelphia, 1887
- Studies in Plant and Organic Chemistry, Riverside Press, Cambridge, Massachusetts, 1907

== Activities and honors ==
- American Philosophical Society (1887)
- American Association for the Advancement of Science
- Franklin Institute of Philadelphia
- Deutsche Chemische Gesellschaft (Berlin)
