= Peter Michel =

German art scholar

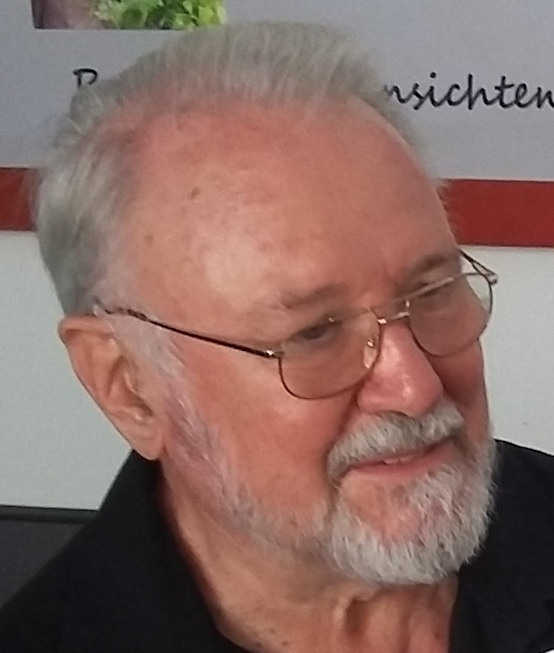
Peter Michel July 2019

Peter Michel (born 14 October 1938) is a German art scholar, publicist and exhibition organizer.

== Life ==
Born in Freyburg (Unstrut), Michel comes from a craftsman family. After attending the Immanuel-Kant-Gymnasium (Berlin), after the Abitur, he studied German studies and art education at the Pädagogische Hochschule Erfurt/Mühlhausen from 1956 to 1959. From 1959 to 1964 he was a teacher at the secondary school Neudorf. Afterwards he worked in the district administration Annaberg and in the district administration Karl-Marx-Stadt of Free German Youth. From 1970 to 1974 followed an Aspirantur at the Akademie für Gesellschaftswissenschaften beim ZK der SED; there he completed his doctorate on the topic "Interrelations between professional and non-professional art". In 1974 he became a member of the Verband Bildender Künstler der DDR (VBK) and member of the Central Board of the VBK. From 1974 to 1987 he was the director of the journal Bildende Kunst (Organ of the Central Board of the VBK) published by Henschelverlag.

Because of public criticism of the curriculum for the subject art education, Michel was regulated in 1976 by the Ministerium für Volksbildung (DDR). A year later, a controversy followed with politician Hans Koch about the contemporary nature of the term "Socialist Realism".

From 1979 to 1991 he was a member of the International Association of Art Critics. From 1987 to 1989 he worked as secretary of the central committee of the Verband Bildender Künstler der DDR (VBK). At the end of 1989 he resigned from the VBK and from the Socialist Unity Party of Germany (SED/PDS). Up to the dissolution of the publishing house structure he was for a short time artistic-technical director of the Kinderbuchverlag Berlin; then unemployment followed. From 1991 until 2003 he worked as a freelancer for pb-Verlag Munich, exhibition organizer and freelance journalist. Michel had working stays in 19 European and non-European countries. Since 1990 he has focused his attention on a respectful treatment of art created in the German Democratic Republic. In 1995 he handed over a collection of texts for archiving and research to the Art Research Center in the Getty Center. In 1991 Michel became a founding member of the association Gesellschaft zum Schutz von Bürgerrecht und Menschenwürde (GBM) and member of the federal board of the GBM. He was speaker of the GBM's "Culture" working group and a founding member of the "Art from the GDR" circle of friends. From 2004 to 2008 and in 2012 he took over as editor-in-chief of the magazine ICARUS of the GBM, which was discontinued in the same year.

== Publications and exhibitions ==
=== Own book publications ===
- Die Staffelei im Hühnerhof, Der Kinderbuchverlag Berlin (2 editions 1981,1982)
- Buchbilder. Klaus Ensikat und seine Illustrationen, performed by Michel, Der Kinderbuchverlag Berlin 1989
- Ankunft in der Freiheit. Essays gegen den Werteverlust der Zeit, Verlag am Park, Berlin 2011
- Kulturnation Deutschland? Streitschrift wider die modernen Vandalen, with documentary picture section; Verlag Wiljo Heinen, Berlin and Böklund 2013, ISBN 978-3-95514-003-8
- Künstler in der Zeitenwende I. Biografische Miniaturen und ein Prolog von Armin Stolper, Verlag Wiljo Heinen, Berlin und Böklund 2016, ISBN 978-3-95514-911-6
- Künstler in der Zeitenwende II. Biografische Miniaturen und ein Prolog von Wiljo Heinen, Verlag Wiljo Heinen, Berlin und Böklund 2018, ISBN 978-3-95514-912-3
- Gewissenstrommler. Essays zur bildenden Kunst 1994–2018, Verlag Wiljo Heinen, Berlin and Böklund, 2018, ISBN 978-3-95514-036-6.

List of publications.

=== Contributions in other book publications and catalogues ===
- Mythos und Ethos. Essay für die Monographie Heidrun Hegewald – Zeichnungen, Malerei, Graphik, Texte, ed. by Angelika Haas and Bernd Kuhnert, ARTE-MISIA-PRESS Berlin 2004
- Lexikon Künstler in der DDR, ed. by Dietmar Eisold, Verlag Neues Leben Berlin 2010, Leitung der Redaktionsgruppe
- Text für den Katalog "Gudrun Brüne – Lebensspuren" des Museums am Dom Würzburg, ed. by Michael Koller and Jürgen Lenssen, o. J.
- Mit Kopf und Herz, text for the catalog Nils Burwitz – It’s about time…" on the occasion of his personal exhibition at the Forum ALTE POST in Pirmasens 2017

=== Articles in the German press ===
- Die Naiven – Verklärung und Realität, Artikelfolge in der Zeitschrift „Bildnerisches Volksschaffen“, issues 2 to 5/1974
- 20 Jahre Kultur-Vandalismus. DDR-Kunst soll als "ein hässlicher Regentropfen der Geschichte rasch verdunsten", in special issue of the Deutsche Geschichte: 20 Jahre deutsch-deutsches Dilemma – eine alternativlos ehrliche Bilanz, Einheit in Zwietracht, issue 1/2010

=== Articles in foreign newspapers and magazines ===
- Kammerton der Bildhauerkunst. Bemerkungen zur Ausstellung „Kleinplastik und Graphik aus der DDR“ in Moskau, in Sowjetliteratur (deutschsprachige Ausgabe, Moskau), Heft 11/1976
- Kathedrale eines Zeitalters. Zum Panorama-Gemälde Werner Tübkes in Bad Frankenhausen, in Vytvarny Zivot (Bratislava), issue 3/1987; Müvészet (Budapest), issue 11–12/1986; Iskusstvo (Sofia), issue 8/1986; Tvortschestvo (Moskau), issue 9/1986; arta (Bukarest), issue 1/1987

=== Articles in the newspaper Marxistische Blätter ===
- Fünf Schwierigkeiten im Umgang mit der Kunst Willi Sittes, issue 4/1994
- Schreiben über die Kunstgeschichte der DDR oder Anatomie eines Glaubenswechsels, issue 1 and 2/2001

=== Articles in the newspaper Icarus ===
- Häftlingsnummer B 3936. Der arge Weg Heinrich Sussmanns, issue 2/2005
- Die Verhältnisse durchschaubar machen. Laudatio zur Verleihung des Menschenrechtspreises des Vereins GBM an Heidrun Hegewald, Willi Sitte and Walter Womacka, issue 1/2010
- Verbrechen an der deutschen Kultur. Gedanken zum 75. Jahrestag der Eröffnung der Ausstellung Entartete Kunst in München, issue 3–4/2012

=== Articles in the daily junge Welt ===
- Nachdenken in einem beseitigten Mahnmal. Heidrun Hegewald gewidmet, 20 October 2006
- Er ist hier bei uns. Gedanken zum 130. Geburtstag von Pablo Picasso, 25 October 2011
- Theatrum mundi. 14. September 1989: Einweihung des Panoramabildes „Frühbürgerliche Revolution in Deutschland“ von Werner Tübke in Bad Frankenhausen, 13./14 September 2014
- Dialektischer Realismus. Grundbegriff für eine Kunstgeschichte der DDR. Zum Tod des Kunsthistorikers Peter H. Feist, 4 August 2015
- Ein eigenes Urteil bilden. Das Potsdamer Museum Barberini zeigt Kunst aus der DDR – darunter zahlreiche Bilder, die nach 1990 nicht mehr zu sehen waren, 15 November 2017
- (Further more than 100 contributions for press, radio, television and catalogues; lectures and readings at home and abroad)

=== Exhibitions ===
- Personal exhibition of the Moscow painter Tatjana Nasarenko in the Haus der Bürgerschaft Bremen 1986 (opening speech)
- Der eigene Blick. Berliner Kunstkritiker zeigen Kunst ihrer Wahl im Ephraim Palace Berlin 1988 (participation with own collection, catalogue text)
- Personalausstellung des österreichischen jüdischen Malers Heinrich Sussmann im Prussian Heritage Image Archive Berlin 1989 (Konzeption, Organisation, Eröffnungsrede)
- Gerhard Rommel for his 80th birthday. Exhibition in the Klostergalerie Zehdenick 2014 (opening speech)
- Four lives. Two pairs of artists in the Armenian tradition. Exhibition at the Kulturhaus Berlin-Karlshorst 2016 (co-curator, catalogue author, statement on the opening)
- Participation in further numerous exhibitions in Freudenstadt, Wittlich, Seeheim-Jugenheim, Neu-Ulm, in the GBM-Gallery and other Berlin galleries, in Kuopio (Finland), in the Art Gallery Gera, the Protestant Academy Meissen, the Municipal Gallery Eisenhüttenstadt, in the Art Association Templin and others

== Participation in juries ==
- 100 selected graphics, 100 best posters, selection committee painting and graphics of the X. Kunstausstellung der DDR

== Literature ==
- Anke Scharnhorst: Michel, Peter in Wer war wer in der DDR? 5th edition. BVolume 2, Ch. Links, Berlin 2010, ISBN 978-3-86153-561-4.

== Awards and honours ==
- 1983 Verdienstmedaille der DDR
- 1984 Banner of Labor
- Human Rights Award of the Society for the Protection of Civil Rights and Human Dignity 2015 The laudatory speech was held by the painter and graphic artist Heidrun Hegewald.
