= Robert Michael (historian) =

Robert Michael (1936–2010) was a Professor Emeritus of European History at the University of Massachusetts Dartmouth. He is the father of singer-songwriter Avi Jacob.

== Bibliography ==
=== Books ===
- A History of Catholic Antisemitism: The Dark Side of the Church (2008), Palgrave Macmillan ISBN 0230603882
- Holy Hatred: Christianity, Antisemitism, and the Holocaust (2006) Palgrave Macmillan. ISBN 1403974721
- A Concise History of American Antisemitism: (2005). Rowman & Littlefield Publishers, Inc. ISBN 0742543137
- Dictionary of Antisemitism: From the Earliest Times to the Present (2007). Greenwood Press. ISBN 0810858622
- Nazi Deutsch/Nazi German: An English Lexicon of the Language of the Third Reich [coauthor] (2002) Greenwood Press ISBN 031332106X
- The Holocaust Chronicle: A History in Words and Picture [coauthor] (1998) Publications International, Ltd. ISBN 0765759845
- The Holocaust: A Chronology and Documentary (1998) Jason Aronson Publishers ISBN 0765759845
- The Houghton -Mifflin Guide to the Internet for History (1996) Houghton-Mifflin ISBN 0395814545
- Fatal Image (1992) Ginn Press ISBN 0-536-58138-X
- Fatal Vision: The History of Christian Theological anti-Semitism and the nature of the Holocaust (1990) Ginn Press ISBN 0536578893
- The Radicals and Nazi Germany (1982) University Press of America ISBN 0819124222

=== Articles ===
Antisemitism and the Church Fathers chapter in Marvin Perry and Frederick Schweitzer’s’ Jewish-Christian Encounters Through the Centuries: Symbiosis, Prejudice, Holocaust, Dialogue (1994) ISBN 0820420824

Antisemitism: Did the Holocaust have its origins in the anti-Semitism of the nineteenth century? History in Dispute, Vol. 11: The Holocaust (2002) ISBN 9781558624559

“Antisemitism: Did the Holocaust have its origins in the antisemitism of the nineteenth century?” in History in Dispute, Vol. 11: The Holocaust, ed. Tandy McConnell. (Gale Publishing, 2002)”

“Sub Species Aeternitatis: Teaching After Teaching,” Chronicle of Higher Education (November 2002)

“Kishinev, 1903-2003,” Menorah Review (Fall 2002)

“Peter Bertocci,” Boston University College of Arts and Sciences (Fall 2002)

“Emeritus,” Chronicle of Higher Education Review (Summer 2002)

“The Present and Future of the Internet for Scholars,” On Campus (1997)

“Antisemitism and the Church Fathers,” chapter in Marvin Perry and Frederick Schweitzer, Jewish-Christian Encounters Through the Centuries: Symbiosis, Prejudice, Holocaust, Dialogue (New York 1995).

“Religious Antisemitism and American Immigration Policy During the Holocaust,” Australian Journal of Jewish Studies vol. 7, no. 1 (1993), pp. 9–40.

“Christian Antisemitism, Adolf Hitler, and the Holocaust” (Part II), Menorah Review (Winter 1993-1994), pp. 2–5.

“Christian Antisemitism, Adolf Hitler, and the Holocaust” (Part I), Menorah Review (Fall 1993)

“Facts and Fallacies About Jewish-Christian Relations,” Menorah Review (Fall 1992)

“In the Lifeboat Together: American Protestants and Jews,” Menorah Review (Virginia Commonwealth University)

“Christian Theological Antisemitism: Jewish Values Turned Upside-Down,” Menorah Review (Spring 1992), pp. 3–5.

“Christian Antisemitism and Richard Wagner: A Reexamination,” Patterns of Prejudice (December 1991-January 1992).

“Puzzling Over Evil,” Judaica Book News (Fall/Winter 1990-1), pp. 29–30, 32.

“Dreyfus and French Catholicism,” Menorah Review, Virginia Commonwealth University (Summer 1990), pp. 3–5.

“Theologia Gloriae and Civilt Cattolica’s Attitudes Toward the Jews of the Holocaust,” Encounter: Creative Theological Scholarship, Vol. 50, No. 2, Spring, 1989, pp. 151–66.

“Theological Myth, German Antisemitism, and the Holocaust: The Case of Martin Niemoeller,” reprinted in Michael Marrus, ed., The Nazi Holocaust (Westport, CT. and London: Meckler 1988).

“Review of Exile in the Fatherland: Martin Niemoeller’s Letters,” Holocaust and Genocide Studies: An International Journal, Vol. 3, No. 2 (1988), pp. 229–31.

“The Persistence of Theologia Gloriae in Modern Antisemitism: Voltaire, Wagner, Hitler,” Remembering for the Future: Jews and Christians During and After the Holocaust (Oxford: Pergamon Press, 1988), Vol. 1, pp. 720–35.

“Theological Myth, German Antisemitism, and the Holocaust: The Case of Martin Niemoeller,” Holocaust and Genocide Studies: An International Journal, Vol. 2, No. 1 (1987), pp. 105–22.

“Luther, Luther Scholars, and the Jews,” Encounter (Fall 1985), pp. 339–56.

“The Holocaust in Night and Fog,” Cineaste (December 1984), pp. 36–7.

“The Holocaust in Historical, Moral, and Theological Perspective,” Encounter: Creative Theological Scholarship (Summer 1984), pp. 259–70.

“The Foreign Policies of the Radical Party, 1933-1939,” Third Republic/Troisieme Republique (Spring 1984), pp. 1–92.

“Confronting and Transcending the Holocaust: Is It Possible?” Judaica Book News (Fall 1982), pp. 23–8.

=== Other publications ===
“Surviving the Holocaust” and “Martyrdom & Resistance as a Guide to History of the Holocaust,” in Harvey Rosenfeld and Eli Zborowski, eds., A Legacy Recorded (New York 1994), pp. 86–89, 146-149.

“Good and Evil,” Liberal Judaism (electronic publication), 1 Jan. 94.

“Review of Memory Offended,” Martyrdom and Resistance (1993), pp. 2, 4.

“America’s, Britain’s Failure to Rescue Jews,” Martyrdom and Resistance (November–December 1991), pp. 7, 15.

“State Department Said No to Rescue . . . But Only When It Concerned Jews,” Martyrdom and Resistance (September–October 1991), pp. 3, 12.

“American Literary Antisemitism: Twentieth Century,” in Midstream (August–September 1991), pp. 27–29.

“The Miracle of Jewish Resistance,” Martyrdom and Resistance (March–April 1989), pp. 7, 12.

“The Jews in Medieval Art,” New England Historical Association Bulletin (Fall 1988)

“British Government Attitudes Toward Jewish Immigration During the Holocaust,” Martyrdom and Resistance (November–December 1987)

“The Jew as Antihero: Christian Images of the Jew in Medieval Art,” Proceedings of the Seventh Medieval Forum (1986)

“Theological Myth, Christian Antisemitism, and The Merchant of Venice,” Martyrdom and Resistance (January–February 1986)

“America and the Holocaust,” Midstream (February 1985)

“American Antisemitism and the Holocaust,” The South African Jewish Spectator Annual (Fall 1984)

“Theological Myth, Christian Antisemitism, and the Holocaust” Midstream (March 1984)

“German and American Antisemitism During the Holocaust: A Theological Interpretation,” The Jewish Review (U.K.) (January 1984)

“The Holocaust: Some Reflections,” National Catholic Reporter (January 1984)

“Surviving the Holocaust: Some Reflections,” Martyrdom and Resistance (November–December 1983)

“Hostile Myths, German Christian Antisemitism,” Martyrdom and Resistance (September–October 1983)

“Parallels Between Medieval and Modern Antisemitic Myths,” Proceedings of the Fourth Medieval Forum (1983)

“The Theological Causes of the Holocaust,” Martyrdom and Resistance (May–June 1982)

“The Terrible Flaw of Night and Fog,” Martyrdom and Resistance (September–October 1981)

=== Reviews ===
Egal Feldman, Dual Destinies: The Jewish Encounter with Protestant America,” Martyrdom and Resistance (May/June 1991), 2-3.

Michael Dobkowski and Isidor Wallimann, eds., Radical Perspectives on the Rise of Fascism in Germany, 1919-1945,” Revue Etudes Internationales (Universite Laval) (December 1990), 885-87.

Collection de Droit International, le Proces de Nuremberg:Consequences et Actualisation, Revue Etudes Internationales (May 1990).

Robert Herzstein, Roosevelt & Hitler:Prelude to War, Martyrdom and Resistance (April–May 1990)

Gottfried-Karl Kindermann, Hitler’s Defeat in Austria, 1933-1934: Europe’s First Containment of Nazi Expansionism,” Revue Etudes Internationales (December 1989), Vol. 20, no. 4, 914-16.

“A Bibliography of Jewish-Christian Relations,” Judaica Book News (Fall 1989).

Charles Maier, The Unmasterable Past: History, Holocaust, and German National Identity,” Shofar: Journal of Jewish Studies, Vol. 7, No. 3, Spring 1989, Purdue University Jewish Studies pp.101-4.

Arno Mayer, Why Did the Heavens Not Tremble, The International Society for Yad Vashem: Martyrdom and Resistance (May–June 1989), 2, 14.

Stanislav J. Kirschbaum and Anne C. R. Roman, eds., Reflections on Slovak History,” Revue Etudes Internationales (Universite Laval), Vol. 19, No. 4 (December 1988), pp. 744–6.

Positions

Contributing Editor Menorah Review 1989-2009

VCU Center for Judaic Studies

== See also ==
- University Of Massachusetts/Dartmouth
- Historians of Europe
- Scholars of antisemitism
