= William B. Michael =

William Burton Michael (6 March 1922 – 15 May 2004), a student of J. P. Guilford, earned his Ph.D. in quantitative psychometric methods from the University of Southern California. He started his teaching career at Princeton University, and in 1952 joined the faculty at University of Southern California, where he received a joint appointment as an associate professor in psychology and education and as the director of the USC Testing Bureau. Michael authored over 500 publications on test construction, measurement and evaluation, and personality assessment. He also co-chaired a joint committee of the American Psychological Association (APA), American Educational Research Association (AERA) and the National Council on Measurement in Education (NCME) that published Standards for Educational and Psychological Testing, which is the national and international standard of professional guidelines for testing and measurement in research and practice. One of his most widely read books is entitled "Handbook in research and evaluation : a collection of principles, methods, and strategies useful in the planning, design, and evaluation of studies in education and the behavioral sciences".

Michael served as the editor-in-chief of the Review of Educational Research, Educational Research Quarterly, and Educational and Psychological Measurement, one of the oldest journals in education and psychology. His and Steve Isaac's Handbook in Research and Evaluation enjoyed large popularity, with over 200,000 copies in print and his Dimensions of Self Concept (DOSC) questionnaire is used all over the world. Professor Michael retired in December 2003 and continued to work with students up until a few days before his death in May 2004.
