= James Michael (disambiguation) =

James Michael (born 1967) is an American record producer and musician.

James Michael may also refer to:

- General James Michael (forester) (1828–1907), pioneer forester in India
- James Lionel Michael (1824–1868), Anglo-Australian solicitor and poet
- James Harry Michael Jr. (1918–2005), U.S. federal judge

== See also ==
- James Michaels (1921–2007), American journalist and magazine editor
- James Edward Michaels (1926–2010), Roman Catholic bishop
- James Michel (born 1944), President of Seychelles, 2004–2016
- James Michels (1918–1982), U.S. Marine photographed raising the U.S. flag during the Battle of Iwo Jima
- Jim Michaels (born 1965), American television producer
- Jimmy Michael (1877–1904), Welsh world cycling champion
- Michael James (disambiguation)
