= Roger Michael =

British nightlife promoter and marketer

- Born: Roger Michael Noel; 1965 (age 60–61); London, England
- Occupations: Nightlife promoter, marketer, events organiser
- Known for: Founder of I Am Rockstar; The Next Big Thing club night
- Awards: London Club and Bar Awards: Outstanding Achievement (2008), Services to the Nightlife Industry (2013)
- Website: rogermichael.com

Roger Michael Noel, known professionally as Roger Michael, is a British nightlife promoter and marketer based in London. Described as one of "London's most successful promoters" by The Independent in 1997, early in his career he operated notable club nights such as The Next Big Thing in London. The founder of the creative agency and nightclub brand I Am Rockstar, in 2003 he began curating the I Am Rockstar Tuesday club nights. The night grew to be popular amongst a high-profile clientele, including Uma Thurman, Lindsey Lohan, Prince, Dr. Dre, Leonardo DiCaprio, Prince William and Prince Harry. Profiled in publications such as GQ, Michael was featured in the London Evening Standard's 'Power 1000 List' in 2009 and 2010. He has won a number of categories in The London Club and Bar Awards, including their Outstanding Achievement Award. Beyond continuing to organize and market weekly and one-off events, in 2015 Michael became an advisory board member and city ambassador to InList, a members-only mobile app.

== Early life and education ==
Roger Michael Noel was born in London to his late parents Scotilda Anne Noel and Vernon Selwyn Noel. He spent much of the 1970s living with his parents and five other siblings in Grenada. The family returned to London after the November 1979 death of his mother, who had worked as an activist with the National Women's Organization in the country. Michael Noel was thirteen at the time.

== Career ==
=== Early years and The Next Big Thing (1990s-2000s) ===
Not originally intending to go into promotion, Michael started his career in nightlife marketing in 1989, during the Second Summer of Love when acid house parties and raves were becoming popular in Britain. In 1994 he won the Longest Guest List Award for his club night Atomic Model at Iceni at the Piper Champagne London Club And Bar Awards. By late 1995, beyond Atomic Model he was also known for the London club nights The Next Big Thing at the Hanover Grand and Eyeball Arizona at Subterania.

He was soon simultaneously hosting four weekly night nights, including Wednesday nights at Embargo in Chelsea, The Next Big Thing on Thursdays at Hanover Grand in Hanover Square, Atomic Model on Fridays at Iceni in Mayfair, and Saturdays at the Brown's Member's Club in Covent Garden. In 1995 The Independent called The Next Big Thing "a hybrid of Handbag House, dancefloor anthems and a live band." Also by that time, he was running his own company Roger Michael Associates, which organized events which The Independent described as having "an exclusive feel while maintaining a down-to-earth, community vibe." In 1995 Roger Michael Associates also threw a New Year Avant-Garde Catwalk Ball at the Porchester Halls in London, among other one-time events.

The Independent called Michael "one of London's most successful promoters" in 1997, and explained that "his events are renowned for their sense of style and glamour." In the 2000s he also ran two other consecutive nights, including Thursdays at Kabaret's Prophecy in London, and Fridays with Cyril Peret Paglinghi at the Man Ray in Paris. By 1998, The Next Big Thing had DJs such as Derek B, playing a mix of house and speed garage. He also began working for Vivienne Westwood in 1998, providing bespoke guest list for the London launch of her first perfume "Boudoir." The following year he also helped launch Westwood's first store in Manhattan, with the event coinciding with her first US fashion show. In May 1998, Michael was featured in the "Cool Britannia" edition of GQ Germany along with other figures in London such as Tony Blair.

=== I Am Rockstar at Boujis (2003-2012) ===
Michael founded his creative agency and nightlife brand I Am Rockstar in September 2003. Among the brand's earliest projects was an eponymous Tuesday night at the club Boujis members' club in South Kensington, which ran until 2012. In 2006, The London Evening Standard described Tuesdays at Boujis as "hosted by Roger Michael... a favourite with Princes William and Harry that is also adored by models, Eurotrash and Hollywood types." Travel.com wrote in 2009 that "Boujis in Kensington has a reputation around the world for catering to the rich and famous," and that "arguably the most popular night at Boujis is Tuesday." The article further stated the night was popular with celebrities such as Lindsay Lohan, Mischa Barton and Uma Thurman, and other people known for attending include David Furnish, Mickey Rourke, Catherine Middleton before her marriage, Anna Chapman before her indictment as a spy, Prince William and Prince Harry, Prince, Janet Jackson, Quincy Jones, Dr. Dre, Will.i.am, Leonardo DiCaprio, and Avril Lavigne.

=== I Am Rockstar tour and inline (2009-present) ===
In 2009 he formed I Am Rockstar into an international party brand, taking the I Am Rockstar dayclub and nightclub events on tour to venues in Paris, the 2010 Cannes Film Festival, the OHM Festival in Hvar, Croatia, and the United Arab Emirates club Blue Marlin Ibiza. In late 2010, he became creative director of the Night Lounge at Morton's members club in Berkeley Square in London. Beyond club nights, Michael has also curated and hosted events for groups such as Team USA's London Olympics closing parties in 2012.

As of 2009 he was still hosting what the London Evening Standard called a "famed Tuesday night of debauchery at Boujis," with celebrities such as Paris and Nicky Hilton attending, and with DJs such as Lindsay Lohan. Michael was featured in the London Evening Standard's 'Power 1000 List' in 2009 and 2010, two years later he was named as the 2012 London Lifestyle Personality Of The Year, and runner-up to London Mayor Boris Johnson. In 2013, he won the Services To The Nightlife Industry Award at The London Club and Bars Awards.

In early 2015, the members-only mobile app for booking clubs and events, titled InList, brought Michael on as an advisory board member and their city ambassador. After a break from public life, in April 2015 Michael debuted the monthly Thursday club night I Am Rockstar Roar at Mode Collective in Notting Hill, with DJ Sander Kleinenberg as resident at the "Berlin-style club."

== Awards and nominations ==
Year	Award	Nominee	Category	Result
1994	The Piper Champagne; London Club; And Bar Awards	Roger Michael	Longest Guest List Award	Won
1995	The Piper Champagne; London Club; And Bar Awards	Roger Michael	Best Promoter Award	Won
1996	The Piper Champagne; London Club; And Bar Awards	Roger Michael	Best Night Award	Won
1997	The cK Calvin Klein Jeans; London Club And Bar Awards	Roger Michael	Best Night Award	Won
2005	The London Club; And Bar Awards	Roger Michael	Best Party Organizer Award	Won
2006	The London Club; And Bar Awards	I Am Rockstar	Greatest Night Award	Won
2007	The London Club; And Bar Awards	Roger Michael	Up All Night Award	Won
2007	The London Club; And Bar Awards	I Am Rockstar	Best Night Award	Won
2008	The London Club; And Bar Awards	I Am Rockstar	Best Night Award	Won
2008	The London Club; And Bar Awards	Roger Michael	Outstanding Achievement	Won
2012	The London Lifestyle Awards	Roger Michael	Personality Of The Year Award	Runner-up
2012	The London Club and Bar Awards	I Am Rockstar	Best Longest-running Night	Won
2013	The London Club and Bar Awards	Roger Michael	Services To The Nightlife Industry Award	Won

== Filmography ==
Selected film credits for Roger Michael
Yr	Release title	Director/details	Role
2005	Shoot Me! London	Fashion TV (starring Alexa Chung)	Role as "The Promoter" in Ep.7&10
2009	Knife Edge	Director Anthony Hickox	Role in wedding scene

== See also ==
- Clubbing
- Nightlife
