= Emerald River =

Location
- Country: Canada
- Province: British Columbia
- District: Kootenay Land District

Physical characteristics
- Source: Emerald Lake
  - location: Canadian Rockies
  - elevation: 4,226 ft (1,288 m)
- Mouth: Kicking Horse River
  - location: West of Field, British Columbia
  - coordinates: 51°22′56″N 116°32′44″W
  - elevation: 3,843 ft (1,171 m)

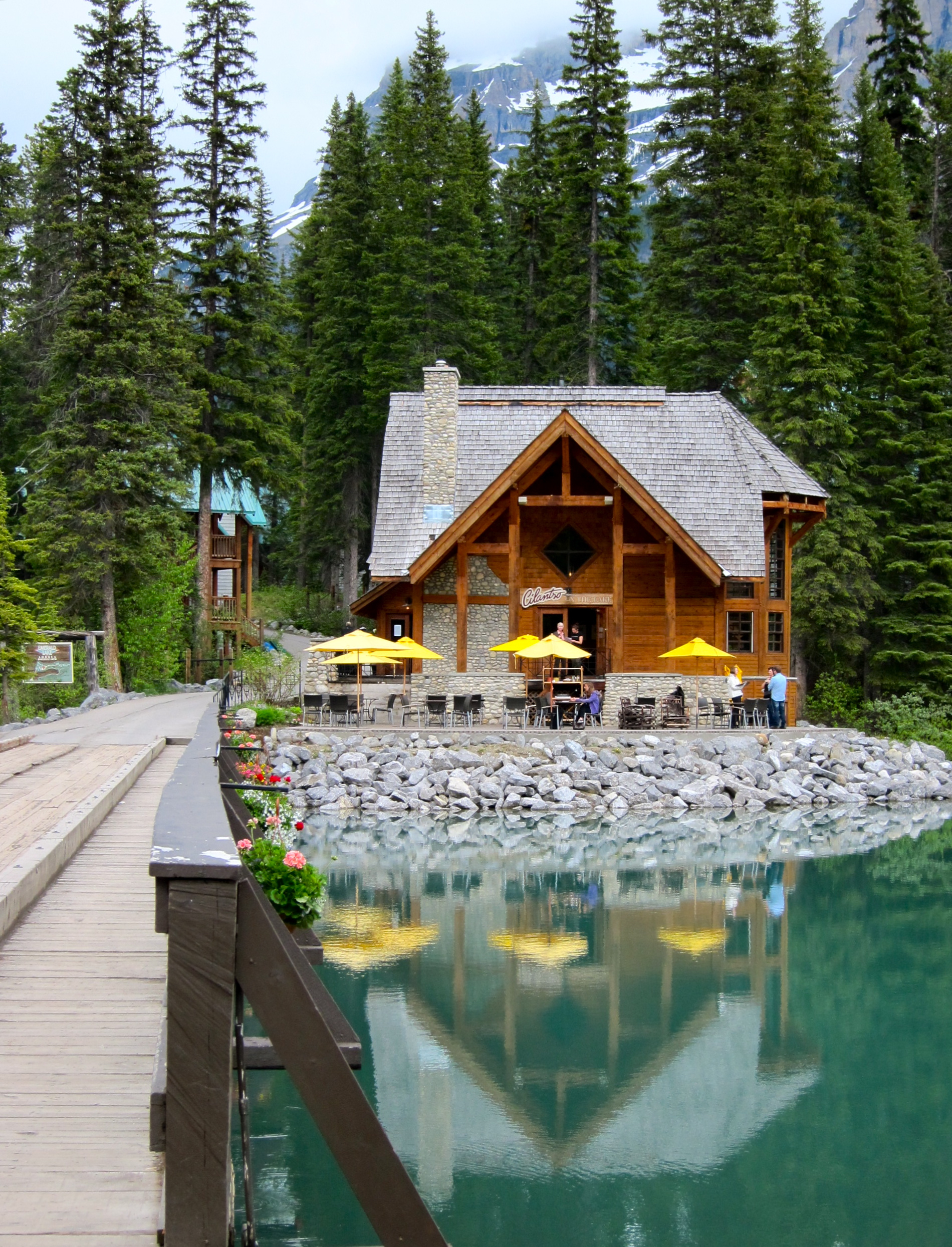
The river exiting the Emerald Lake's south end

The Emerald River is a short river in British Columbia. It is about 6.5 kilometres (4.0 mi) long and drains the waters of Emerald Lake to the Kicking Horse River. The river exits the lake's south end and flows in a southern direction for about 6.5 kilometres (4.0 mi) to its mouth, which is at almost exactly the same place as the mouth of the Amiskwi River. It picks up three named tributaries; Hamilton Creek, Russell Creek and Kendel Creek.

The name of the river was adopted in the 5th Report of the Geographic Board of Canada, 30 June 1904.

== See also ==
- List of rivers of British Columbia
