= Alan Michael (artist) =

Scottish artist (born 1967)

Alan Michael (born 1967 in Paisley, Scotland) is a Scottish artist based in London.

== Education ==
Michael attended Duncan of Jordanstone College of Art & Design in Dundee, and then the Glasgow School of Art.

== Career ==
Michael has exhibited in shows including the 1999 Liverpool Biennial, Put Out More Flags at Sutton Lane in London, Record Collection at Forde Gallery in Geneva, Panache at Els Hanappe Underground in Athens and Kapernekas at Fine Art Inc. in New York City.

== Critical response ==
Moritz Scheper has written that "The paintings of Scottish artist Alan Michael have now been confusing audiences for more than twenty years. ... Strangely, Michael’s high standing in artistic circles does not correspond to the public perception of his work. In a good twenty years of permanent and consistent practice, he has accumulated just two slender (but brilliant) publications and a handful of articles in the specialized press."

Isaac Moss has written of Michael's work that "Michael invites the viewer to overcome their familiarity and rethink what they are looking at."

Rosie Lesso has said of his work that it "seeks out questions and complexities, not straightforward solutions".
