= Aquila Mountain =

Aquila Mountain may refer to:

- Aquila Mountain (Alberta) in Jasper National Park, Alberta, Canada
- Aquila Mountain (British Columbia) in Yoho National Park, British Columbia, Canada
