= Aquila Mountain (British Columbia) =

Mountain in British Columbia, Canada

- Location within British Columbia Location within Canada

Highest point
- Elevation: 2,860 m (9,380 ft) (Note: An alternate source states 2880 m in elevation.)
- Prominence: 160 m (520 ft)
- Parent peak: Chancellor Peak (3266 m)
- Listing: Mountains of British Columbia
- Coordinates: 51°11′27″N 116°29′41″W

Geography
- Country: Canada
- Province: British Columbia
- District: Kootenay Land District
- Protected area: Yoho National Park
- Parent range: Ottertail Range; Canadian Rockies
- Topo map: NTS 82N1 Mount Goodsir

Aquila Mountain is a mountain located south of Chancellor Peak in the Ottertail Range of the Canadian Rockies in British Columbia, Canada. Aquila is the Latin term for eagle.

== See also ==
- Geography of British Columbia
