= Sentry Peak (Ottertail Range) =

Mountain in British Columbia, Canada

- Location within British Columbia Location within Canada

Highest point
- Elevation: 3,257 m (10,686 ft) (Note: An alternate source states 3261 m in elevation.)
- Prominence: 242 m (794 ft)
- Parent peak: Mount Goodsir (3567 m)
- Listing: Mountains of British Columbia
- Coordinates: 51°11′44″N 116°22′58″W

Geography
- Country: Canada
- Province: British Columbia
- District: Kootenay Land District
- Protected areas: Yoho National Park; Kootenay National Park
- Parent range: Ottertail Range; Canadian Rockies
- Topo map: NTS 82N1 Mount Goodsir

Sentry Peak is a mountain located south of Mount Goodsir in the Ottertail Range of the Canadian Rockies in British Columbia, Canada. The mountain was named in 1915 by the Geological Survey of Canada but the name origin is not known.

== See also ==
- List of mountains in the Canadian Rockies
- Geography of British Columbia
