= Mount Hurd =

Mountain in British Columbia, Canada

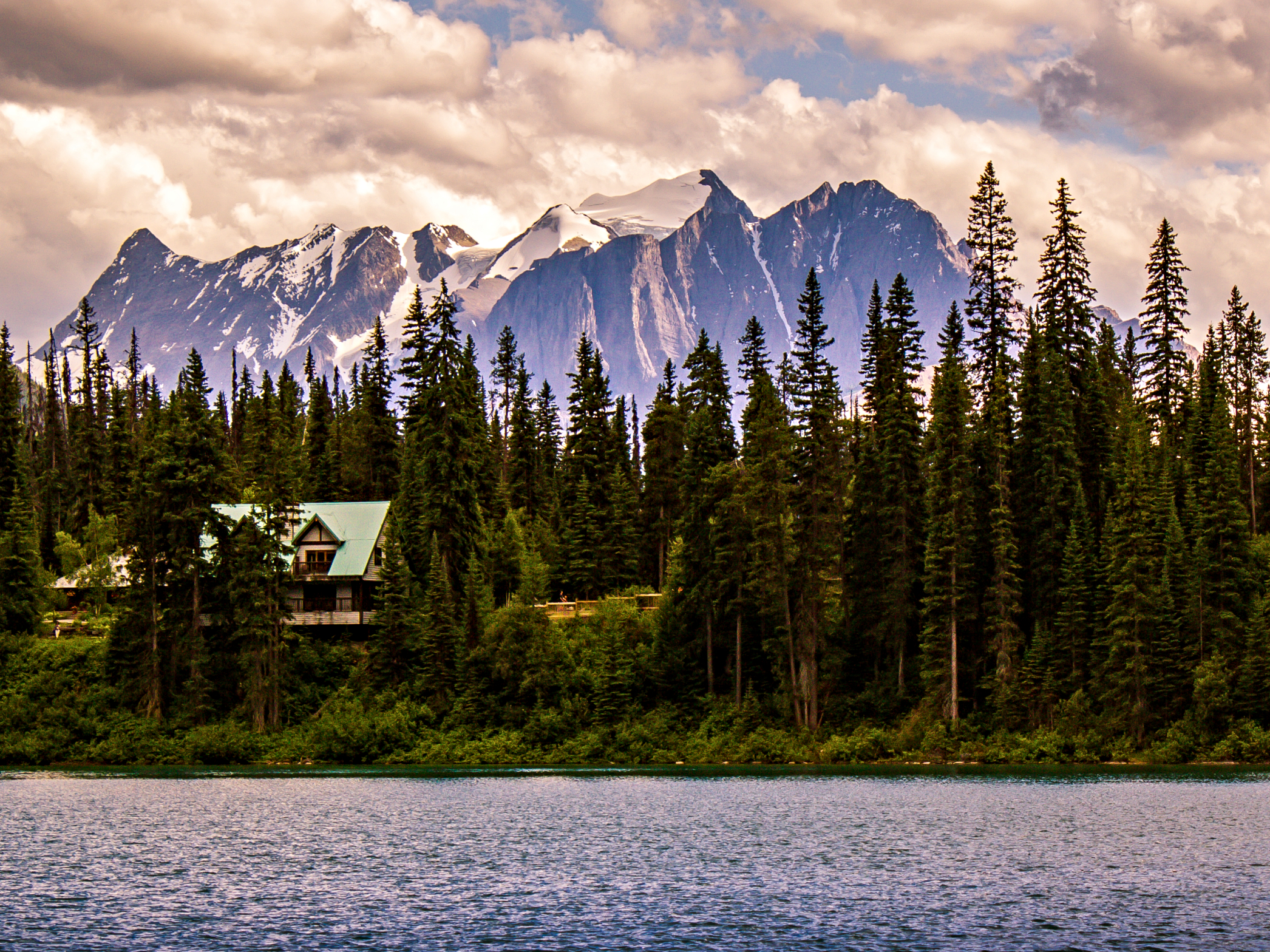
- Mt. Vaux centered with Mt. Hurd furthest right in this view from Emerald Lake

Highest point
- Elevation: 3,000 m (9,800 ft)
- Prominence: 355 m (1,165 ft)
- Parent peak: Mount Vaux
- Listing: Mountains of British Columbia
- Coordinates: 51°17′06″N 116°32′11″W

Geography
- Location within British Columbia Location within Canada
- Country: Canada
- Province: British Columbia
- District: Kootenay Land District
- Protected area: Yoho National Park
- Parent range: Ottertail Range; Park Ranges; Canadian Rockies
- Topo map: NTS 82N7 Golden

Climbing
- First ascent: 1948 Mr. and Mrs. E. Cromwell

Mount Hurd is a mountain in the Ottertail Range of the Canadian Rockies in British Columbia, Canada. It was named after Major Marshall Farnam Hurd (1823-1903) a Canadian Pacific Railway engineer and explorer. It was featured on a 1928 Canada Post 10¢ stamp based on a painting by Frederic Marlett Bell-Smith.

== Climate ==
Based on the Köppen climate classification, Mount Hurd is located in a subarctic climate with cold, snowy winters, and mild summers. Temperatures can drop below −20 °C with wind chill factors below −30 °C. Precipitation runoff from Mount Hurd drains into tributaries of the Kicking Horse River which is a tributary of the Columbia River.

== See also ==
- Geography of British Columbia
