= Park Mountain =

Mountain in Canada

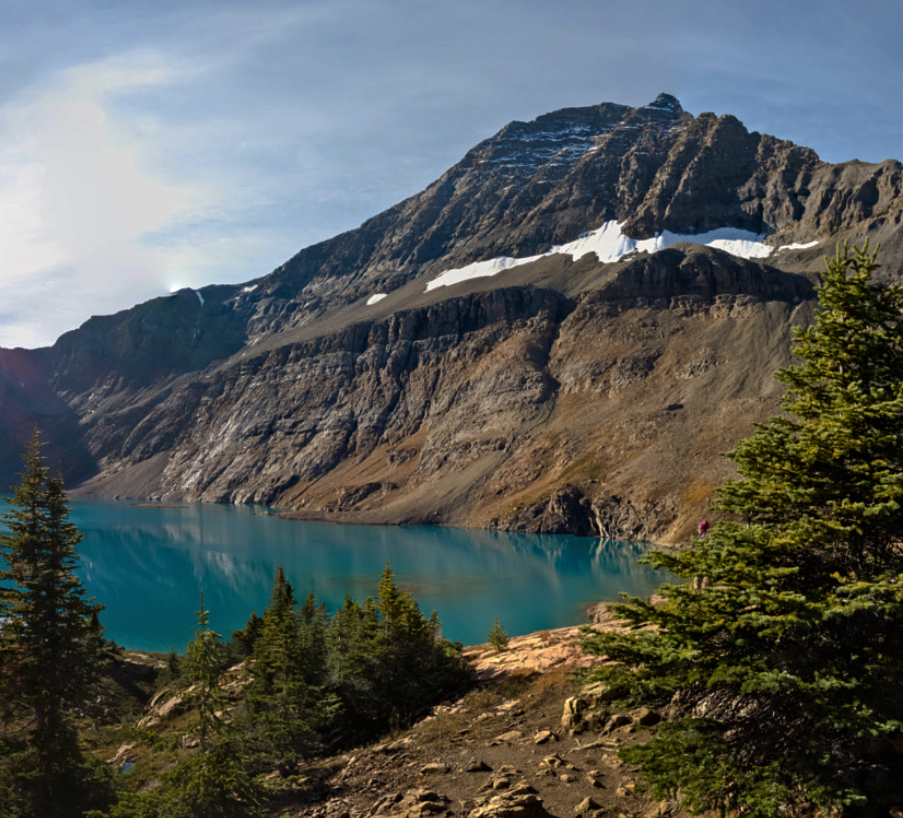
- Park Mountain and Lake McArthur

Highest point
- Elevation: 2,951 m (9,682 ft)
- Prominence: 338 m (1,109 ft)
- Parent peak: Mount Biddle (3,320 m)
- Listing: Mountains of British Columbia
- Coordinates: 51°19′37″N 116°21′06″W

Geography
- Location within British Columbia Location within Canada
- Interactive map of Park Mountain
- Location: British Columbia, Canada
- District: Kootenay Land District
- Parent range: Bow Range; Canadian Rockies
- Topo map: NTS 82N8 Lake Louise

Geology
- Rock age: Cambrian
- Rock type: sedimentary rock

Climbing
- First ascent: 1904 Survey Party
- Easiest route: Scramble class 3

Park Mountain is a 2,951-metre (9,682-foot) mountain summit located above the southwest shore of Lake McArthur in Yoho National Park, in the Bow Range of the Canadian Rockies of British Columbia, Canada. Its nearest higher peak is Mount Biddle, 3.0 km (1.9 mi) to the east. Park Mountain is situated four kilometres west of the Continental Divide, and 12 km (7.5 mi) southeast of Field, British Columbia.

== History ==
The mountain was named in 1915 because of the "park-like" setting of the area. The Lake O'Hara area that the mountain is located in is a gem within a park, the best that the Canadian Rockies has to offer.

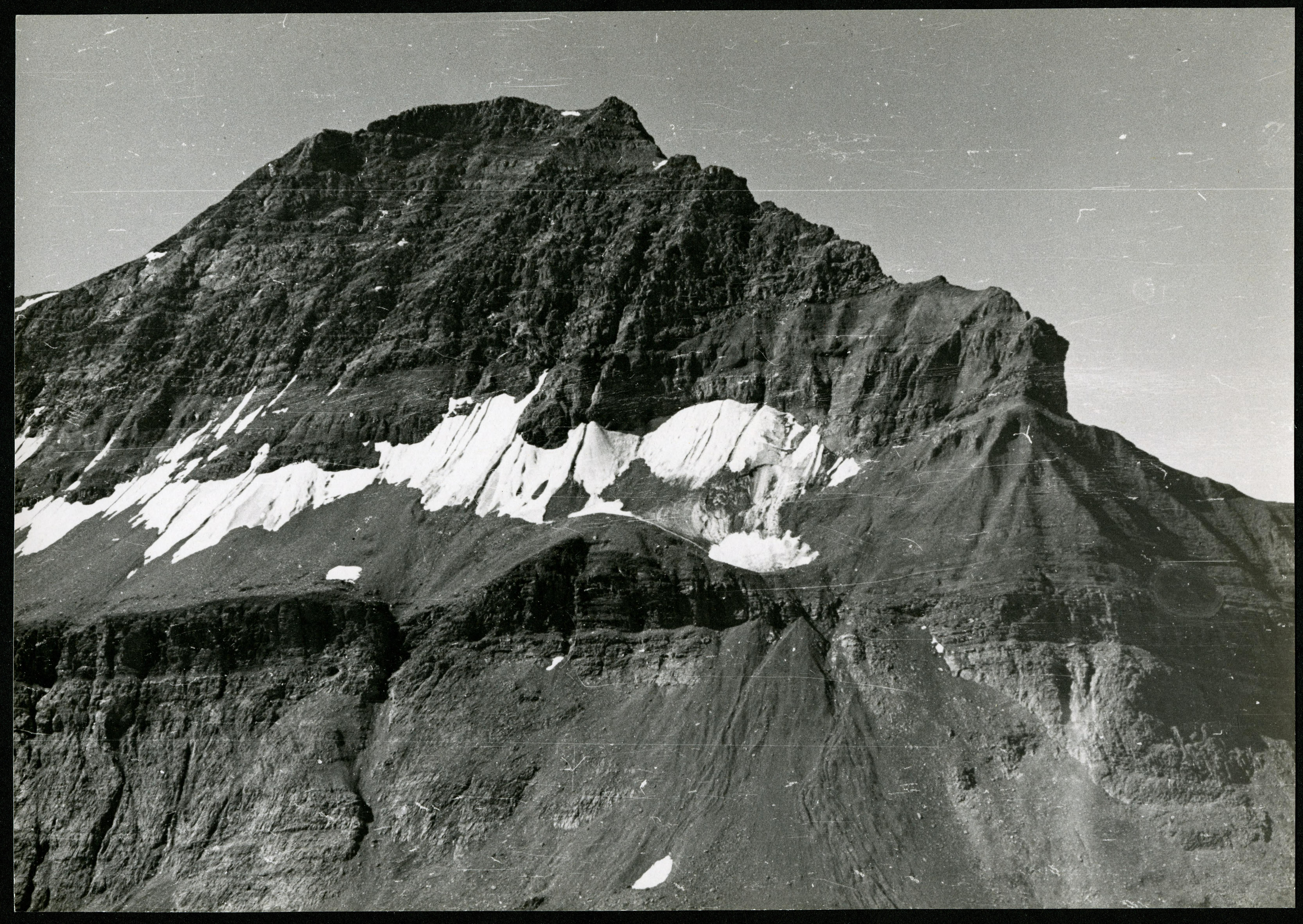
In mid-20th century

The first ascent of the mountain was made in 1904 by a survey party.

The mountain's toponym was officially adopted in 1952 when approved by the Geographical Names Board of Canada.

== Geology ==
Park Mountain is composed of sedimentary rock laid down during the Precambrian to Jurassic periods. Formed in shallow seas, this sedimentary rock was pushed east and over the top of younger rock during the Laramide orogeny.

== Climate ==
Based on the Köppen climate classification, Park Mountain is located in a subarctic climate zone with cold, snowy winters, and mild summers. Winter temperatures can drop below −20 °C with wind chill factors below −30 °C. Precipitation runoff from Park Mountain drains into tributaries of the Kicking Horse River which is a tributary of the Columbia River.

== See also ==
- Geography of British Columbia
