= Mount Ennis =

Mountain in British Columbia, Canada

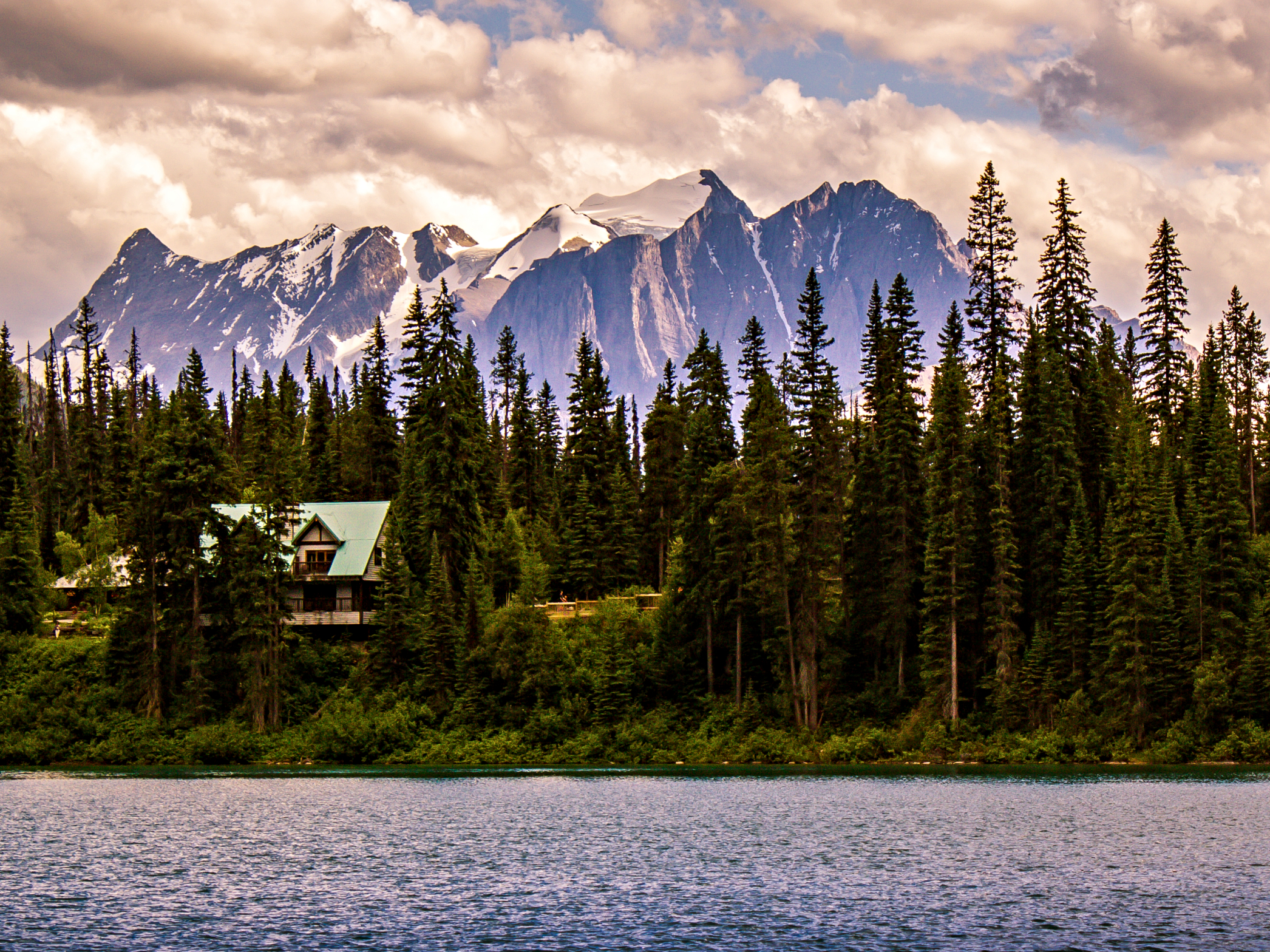
- Mt. Ennis (far left) above Emerald Lake

Highest point
- Elevation: 3,122 m (10,243 ft) (Note: Other sources state 3133 m for the elevation.)
- Prominence: 147 m (482 ft) (Note: An alternate source states 142 m for the prominence.)
- Parent peak: Mount Vaux (3310 m)
- Listing: Mountains of British Columbia
- Coordinates: 51°15′29″N 116°30′06″W

Geography
- Location within British Columbia Location within Canada
- Country: Canada
- Province: British Columbia
- District: Kootenay Land District
- Protected area: Yoho National Park
- Parent range: Ottertail Range; Canadian Rockies
- Topo map: NTS 82N7 Golden

Climbing
- First ascent: 1906 Topographical Survey

Mount Ennnis is a mountain located west of Mount Vaux in the Ottertail Range of the Canadian Rockies in British Columbia, Canada. Edward Whymper named it in 1904 for John Ennis, Scottish-born general manager of the Allan Steamship Line, Liverpool, England.

== See also ==
- List of mountains in the Canadian Rockies
- Geography of British Columbia
