= James Outram =

James Outram may refer to:

- Sir James Outram, 1st Baronet (1803–1863), British general
- James Outram (mountaineer) (1864–1925), British clergyman and mountaineer
