= Lake McArthur (British Columbia) =

Lake in Yoho National Park, British Columbia, Canada

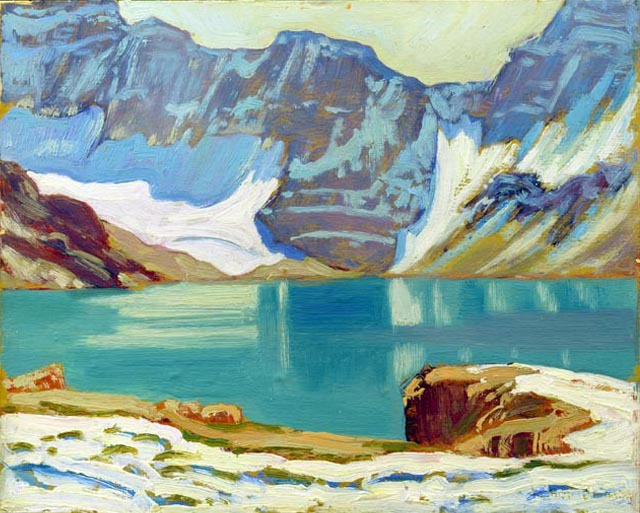
- Lake McArthur, Yoho Park (1924) by J. E. H. MacDonald

- Location in British Columbia
- Location: Yoho National Park, British Columbia, Canada
- Coordinates: 51.332477°N 116.337908°W
- Basin countries: Canada
- Max. length: 1.5 km (0.93 mi)
- Max. width: 0.68 km (0.42 mi)
- Surface area: 75 ha (190 acres)
- Max. depth: 85 m (279 ft)

Lake McArthur is a lake in Yoho National Park, British Columbia, Canada, near the continental divide.

== Location ==
Lake McArthur (JANHI) is in the Kootenay Land District of British Columbia. It is nestled in a valley between Mount Schaffer and Park Mountain in Yoho National Park. The lake is 1.5 kilometres (0.93 mi) long and 85 metres (279 ft) deep. It is easily the deepest lake in the park, and its depth gives it a deep blue colour. It is the largest lake in the area and is much photographed. A 1906 guide to resorts in the Canadian Rockies describes Lake O'Hara, in the next valley west of Lake Louise and across the Continental Divide. It goes on, "A couple of miles away is McArthur's Lake, a sapphire gem, located above the tree line, and with a huge glacier, fed on the precipitous heights of Mount Biddle, terminating in the water, where it breaks off in huge icebergs.

== Name ==
Lake McArthur is named after James Joseph McArthur (1856–1925) of the Dominion Topographical Survey. He was the first European to describe this lake and Lake O'Hara. He found the two lakes in 1887. McArthur was mapping the land through which the Canadian Pacific Railway line would travel, and he and his assistant T. Riley had to climb up to summits carrying heavy equipment so McArthur could take photographs and make measurements for his survey.

== Access ==
Lake McArthur may be accessed via an 8-kilometre (5.0 mi) circuit hike from Le Relais Day Shelter in Yoho Park. The shelter is reached via an 11-kilometre (6.8 mi) access road. The Lake O'Hara bus goes past the shelter, but reservations are required. There is a 310-metre (1,020 ft) elevation gain. The trail passes through larch forests, past Schäffer Lake, through McArthur Meadows and over the summit of McArthur Pass.

== See also ==
- List of lakes of British Columbia

== Sources ==
- Akrigg, G.P. (Philip) V.; Akrigg, Helen (2011-11-01), British Columbia Place Names: Third Edition, UBC Press, ISBN 978-0-7748-4170-2
- "Lake McArthur", 10hikes, archived from the original on 2018-06-30
- Lake McArthur, Natural Resources Canada
- Leigh (18 November 2013), "The Hike To Lake McArthur, Lake O'Hara Region, Yoho NP", hikebiketravel.com
- Resorts in the Canadian Rockies, Canadian Pacific Railway Company. Canadian Pacific Hotels, 1906
- Scott, Chic (2000), Pushing the Limits: The Story of Canadian Mountaineering, Rocky Mountain Books Ltd, ISBN 978-0-921102-59-5
- Sorensen, AnneLise; Williams, Christian (2010-06-07), The Rough Guide to Canada, Rough Guides, ISBN 978-1-84836-956-6
- Townsley, Frank (2016-03-10), British Columbia: Graced by Nature's Palette, FriesenPress, ISBN 978-1-4602-7773-7
- Yoho National Park Trail descriptions, Parks Canada
