= Mount Biddle =

Mountain in British Columbia, Canada

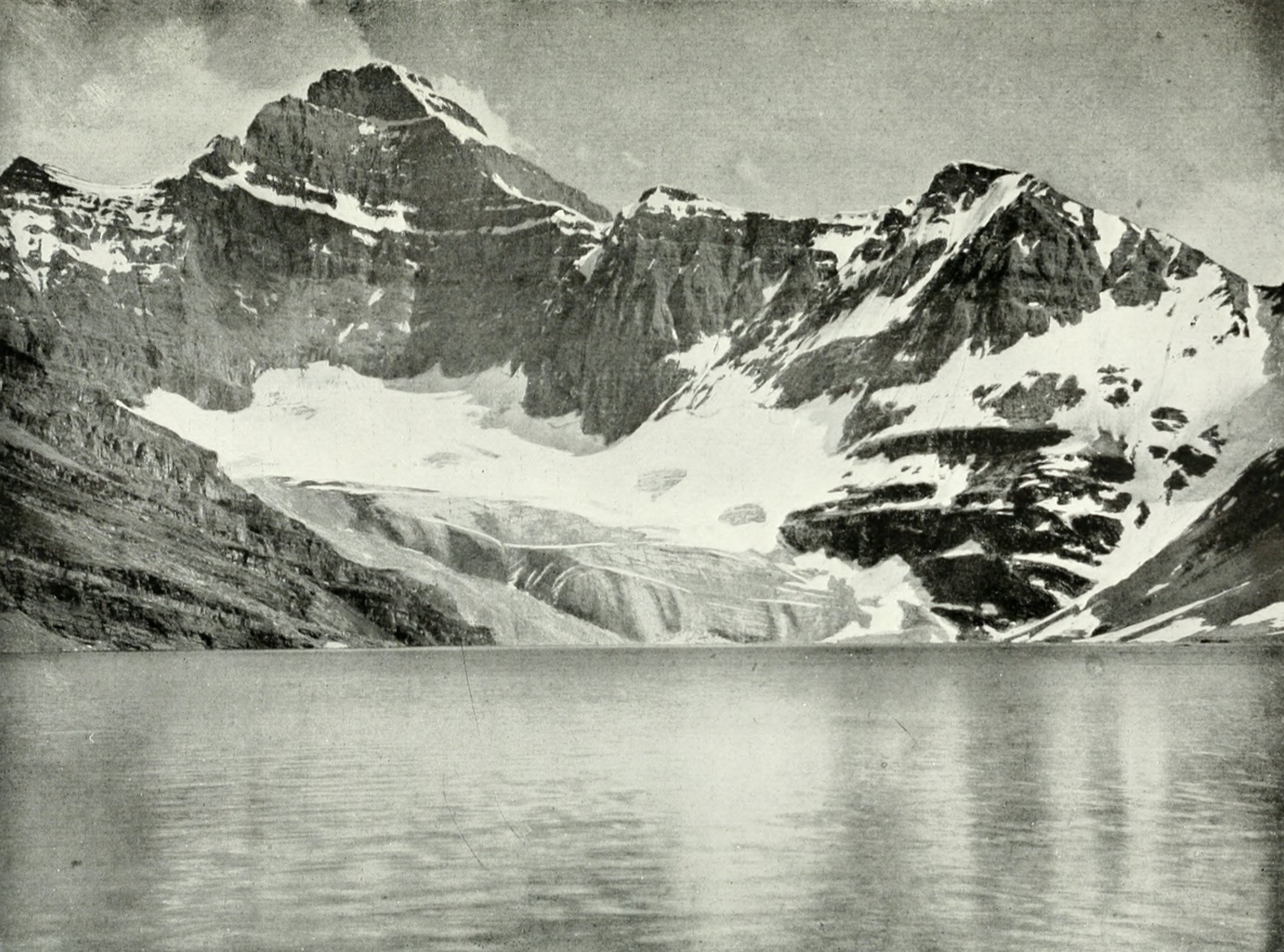
- Mount Biddle and Lake McArthur in 1907

Highest point
- Elevation: 3,320 m (10,890 ft)
- Prominence: 731 m (2,398 ft)
- Parent peak: Mount Hungabee
- Isolation: 1.9 km (1.2 mi)
- Coordinates: 51°19′24″N 116°18′26″W

Geography
- Location within British Columbia
- Country: Canada
- Province: British Columbia
- District: Kootenay Land District
- Parent range: Bow Range, Rocky Mountains
- Topo map: NTS 82N8 Lake Louise

Climbing
- First ascent: 3 September 1902

Mount Biddle is a mountain in British Columbia, Canada.

== Location ==
Mount Biddle is in the Park Ranges of the Rocky Mountains in British Columbia, Canada. It is 3,320 metres (10,890 ft) high, rising 731 metres (2,398 ft) above Opabin Pass, which separates it from Mount Hungabee. It is near to Lake McArthur. The mountain is in the Lake O'Hara area of Yoho National Park.

== History ==
The mountain was named by Samuel E.S. Allen in 1894 after his friend, the author and publisher Anthony Joseph Drexel Biddle (1874–1903). Allen described it as "a gigantic peak, or, more properly, a 'peaked' wall, which bids fair to occupy a prominent place as regards altitude among the other mountains of the region, and when regarded from a climber's point of view is impassible from the N. side, unless it be possible to climb a wall." Allen estimated its height at about 11,700 feet (3,600 m). Curtis Peak, on the south shoulder of Mount Biddle, was named for the mathematics teacher Rest Fenno Curtis (1850–1918). The first ascent was in 1903 by August S. Eggers, Herschel C. Parker, guided by Christian Kaufmann and his brother Hans.

== Gallery ==
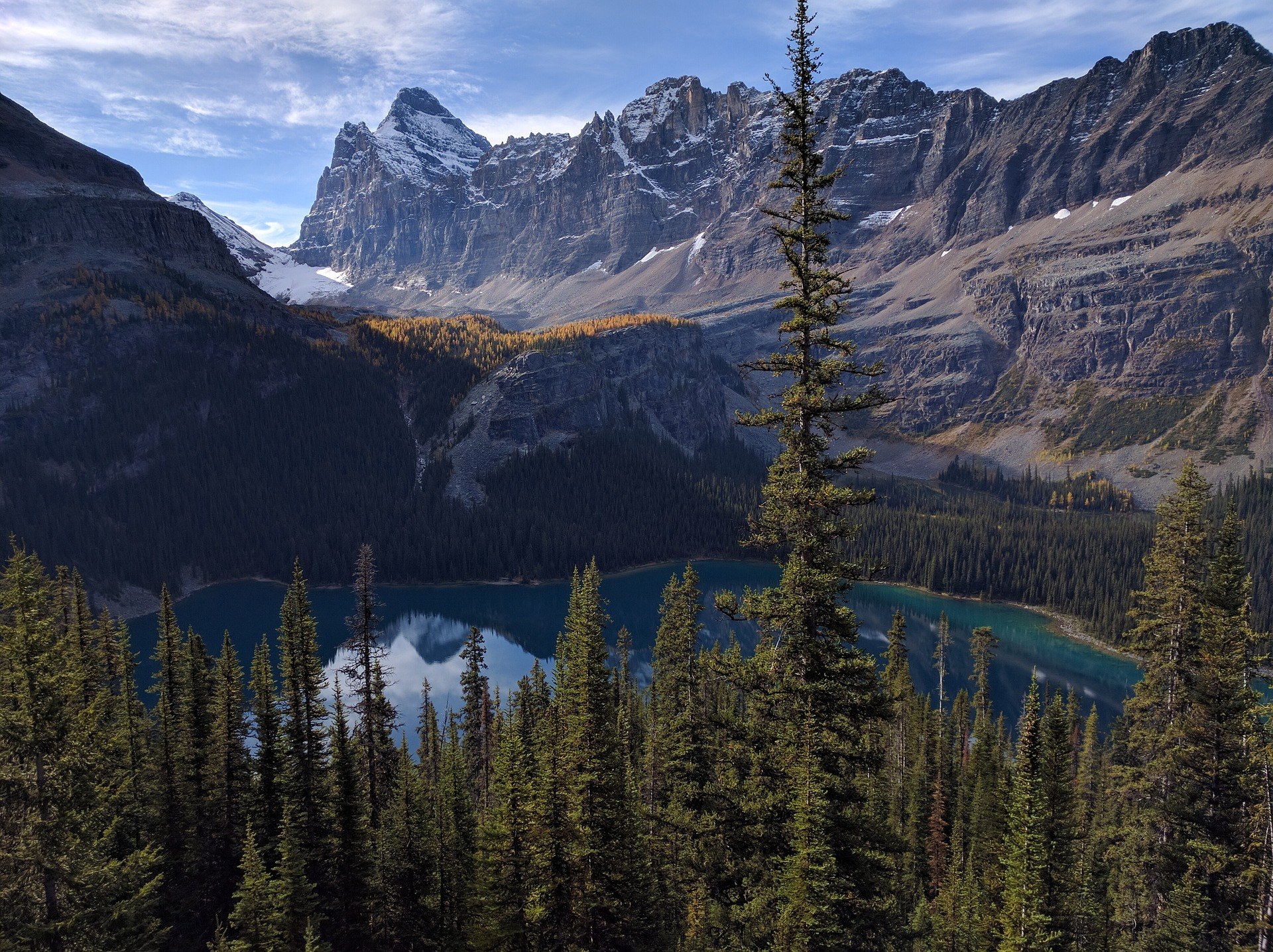
Mount Biddle left of center, Mount Schaffer in upper right corner, Lake O'Hara below

== Sources ==
- "Mount Biddle". Bivouac.com.
- Allen, S.E.S. (1897), "Mountaineering in the Canadian Rockies", in George Yeld (ed.), The Alpine Journal, Alpine Club
- Boles, Glen W.; Putnam, William Lowell; Laurilla, Roger W. (2006), Canadian Mountain Place Names: The Rockies and Columbia Mountains, Rocky Mountain Books Ltd, ISBN 978-1-894765-79-4
- Stranded, Party Separated, Weather, British Columbia, Yoho National Park, Lake O'Hara, Mount Biddle, American Alpine Club, 2005
- "Mount Biddle". Geographical Names Data Base. Natural Resources Canada.
