= Henry Scattergood =

American cricketer

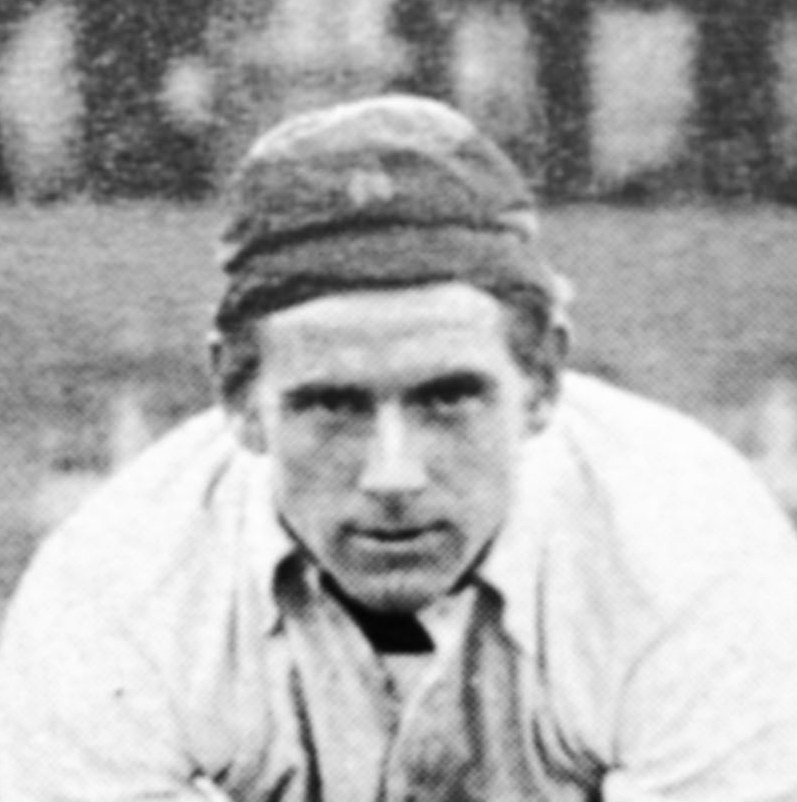

Personal information
- Full name: Joseph Henry Scattergood
- Born: January 26, 1877; Philadelphia, Pennsylvania, U.S.
- Died: June 15, 1953 (aged 76); Wynnewood, Pennsylvania, U.S.
- Batting: Right-handed

Career statistics
Competition	First-class
Matches	16
Runs scored	104
Batting average	5.77
100s/50s	0/0
Top score	13
Catches/stumpings	25/9
- Source: CricketArchive, April 15, 2021

Joseph Henry Scattergood (January 26, 1877 – June 15, 1953) was an American cricketer, active in the late 19th and early 20th centuries. Scattergood was one of the Philadelphian cricketers that played from the end of the 19th century through the early years of the next.

== Early life and education ==
Scattergood was born in Philadelphia, Pennsylvania, to a prominent Quaker family. He began his sports career as a baseball catcher, but was converted to a wicket-keeper while a student at Haverford College.

While at Haverford, Scattergood also played football and tennis and served as the treasurer and secretary of his class. In 1895, he graduated from Haverford with honors in mathematics before going on to more schooling at Harvard University. Following his time at Harvard, Scattergood began a long career as a businessman and philanthropist in the Philadelphia area. It was also at this time that he began playing for the Philadelphian cricket team.

== Cricket career ==
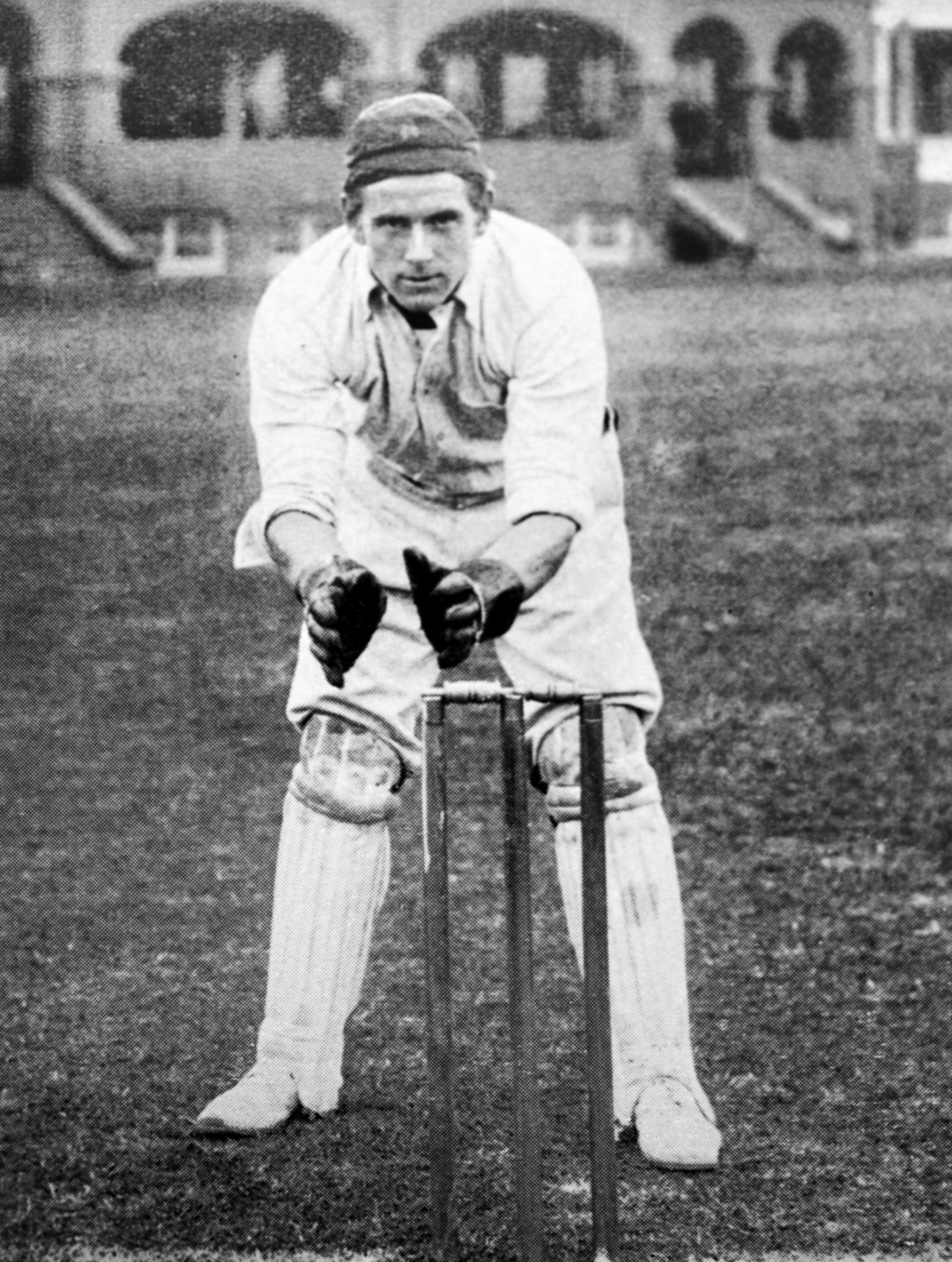
Scattergood posing at the wicket

Having toured in England in 1896 with the visiting team from Haverford, Scattergood's first-class cricket debut came against Gloucestershire on the Philadelphian's 1897 tour of England. Gloucestershire won the match by an innings and 26 runs. In the first innings, Scattergood achieved his high score of 13 and batted for 5 not out in the second innings. He made one catch to dismiss Charlie Townsend. Scattergood played three more matches on this tour before returning to the United States to play visiting side from England.

Scattergood also joined the Philadelphians on their Philadelphian cricket team in England in 1903. He played through the middle of the tour and ended his first-class career with a match against Worcestershire on July 13–15. Unfortunately, Scattergood was injured shortly after taking the field and replaced. This was the end of a very successful career. The English cricketer Gilbert Jessop declared that "the wicket-keeping of Scattergood was every bit as remarkable as was the bowling of Bart King." John Lester wrote that the keeper's "services to cricket extended far beyond his play. Always a defender of the faith, and one of those who strove hardest to stem the decline, he is still an influence in keeping it alive."

=== Mountaineering ===
Scattergood was a founding member of the American Alpine Club. He is credited with first ascents in the Canadian Rockies of Mount Vaux, Chancellor Peak, Wapta Mountain, the north summit of Mount Victoria, and Mount Mollison. In the Selkirk Mountains he climbed Mount Sir Donald, Eagle Peak, and Avalanche Mountain.

== Personal life ==
In 1906, Scattergood married Anne Theodora Morris in Villanova, Pennsylvania. The two had five children.

== Death ==
Scattergood died in Wynnewood, Pennsylvania on June 15, 1953.
