= Lectern Peak =

Mountain in the country of Canada

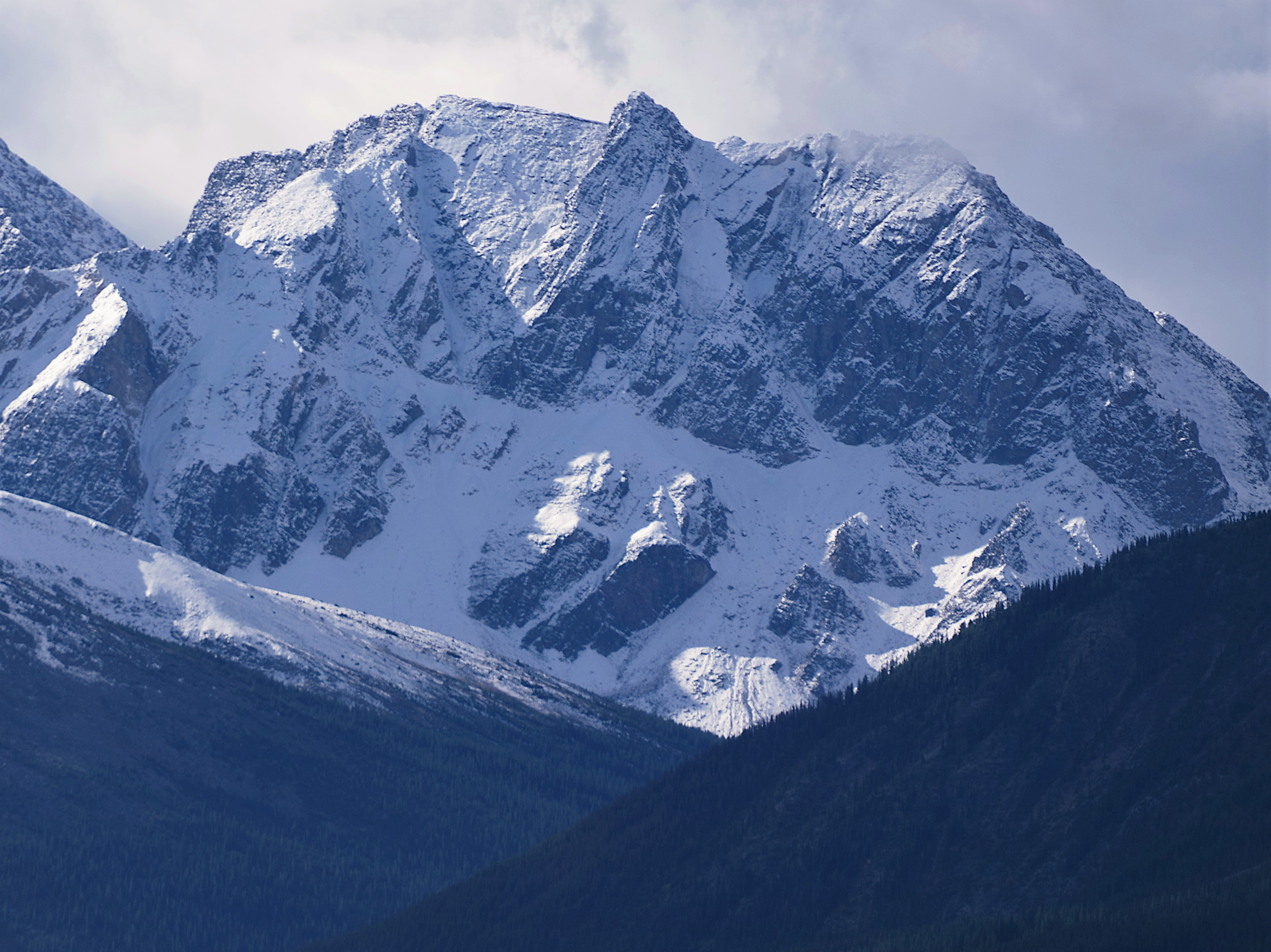
- North aspect

Highest point
- Elevation: 2,772 m (9,094 ft)
- Prominence: 206 m (676 ft)
- Parent peak: Aquila Mountain (2,840 m)
- Isolation: 0.83 km (0.52 mi)
- Listing: Mountains of Alberta
- Coordinates: 52°44′42″N 118°06′42″W

Geography
- Location within Alberta Location within Canada
- Interactive map of Lectern Peak
- Country: Canada
- Province: Alberta
- Protected area: Jasper National Park
- Parent range: Trident Range; Canadian Rockies
- Topo map: NTS 83D9 Amethyst Lakes

Lectern Peak is a 2,772-metre (9,094-foot) mountain summit located in Alberta, Canada.

== Description ==
Lectern Peak is set within Jasper National Park, in the Trident Range of the Canadian Rockies. The town of Jasper is situated 15 kilometres (9.3 mi) to the north and the Continental Divide is 15 kilometres (9.3 mi) to the west. The nearest higher neighbor is Aquila Mountain, 1 km (0.62 mi) to the south. The peak is visible from the Icefields Parkway to the east. Precipitation runoff from Lectern Peak drains into Portal Creek and Astoria River which are both tributaries of the Athabasca River. Topographic relief is significant as the summit rises 900 meters (2,950 feet) above the creek in two kilometers (1.2 mile). A partial ascent of the mountain was made in 1913 by Geoffrey E. Howard who named the peak for its resemblance to a church lectern. He was accompanied by Arnold L. Mumm and Moritz Inderbinen on the expedition. The mountain's toponym was officially adopted March 5, 1935, by the Geographical Names Board of Canada.

== Climate ==
Based on the Köppen climate classification, Lectern Peak is located in a subarctic climate zone with cold, snowy winters, and mild summers. Winter temperatures can drop below -20 °C with wind chill factors below -30 °C.

== Geology ==
The mountain is composed of sedimentary rock laid down during the Precambrian to Jurassic periods and pushed east and over the top of younger rock during the Laramide orogeny.

== Gallery ==
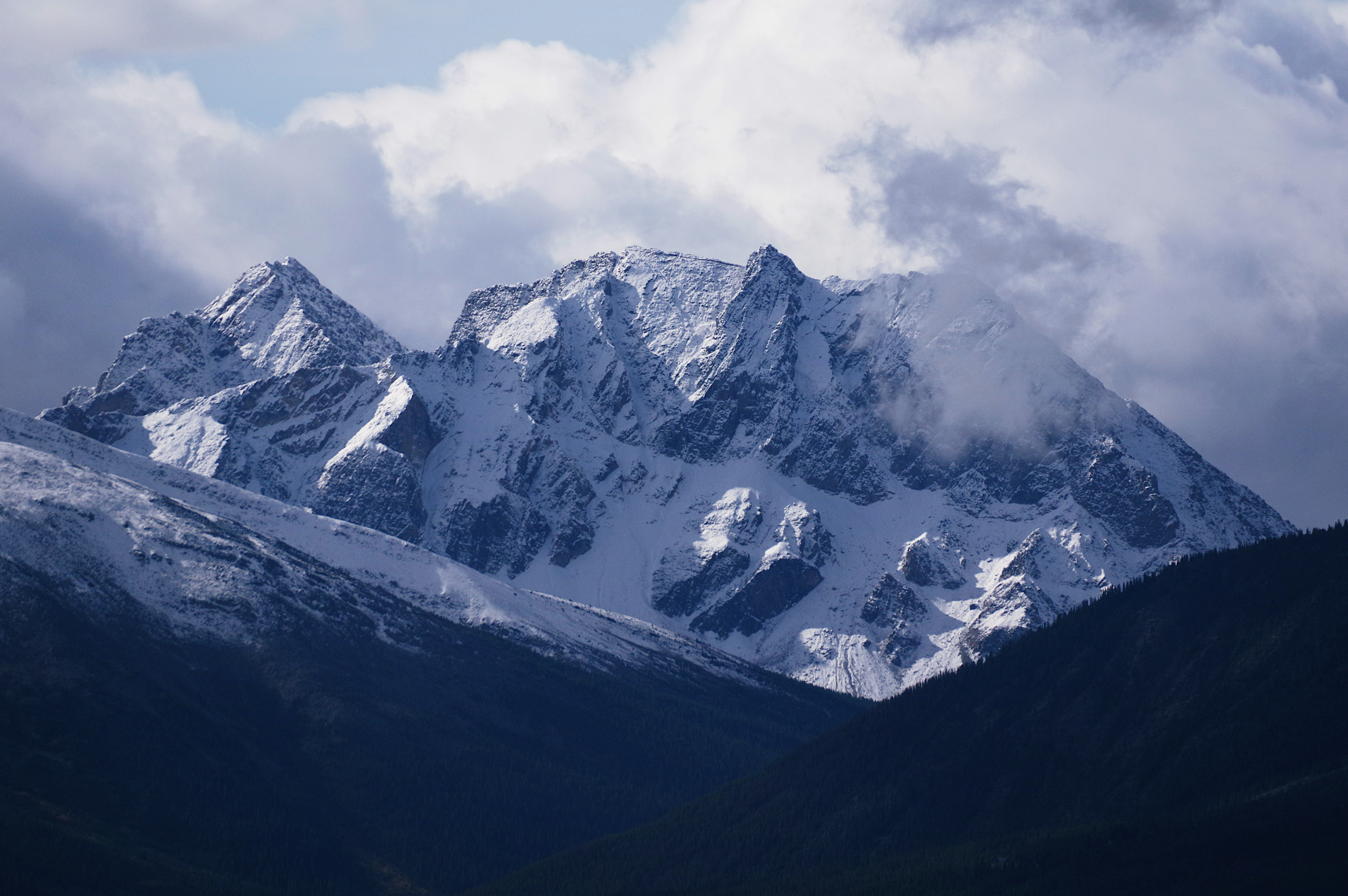
Lectern Peak, with the top of parent Aquila Mountain (left)

== See also ==
- Geography of Alberta
