= Mount Schaffer =

Mountain in Yoho NP, BC, Canada

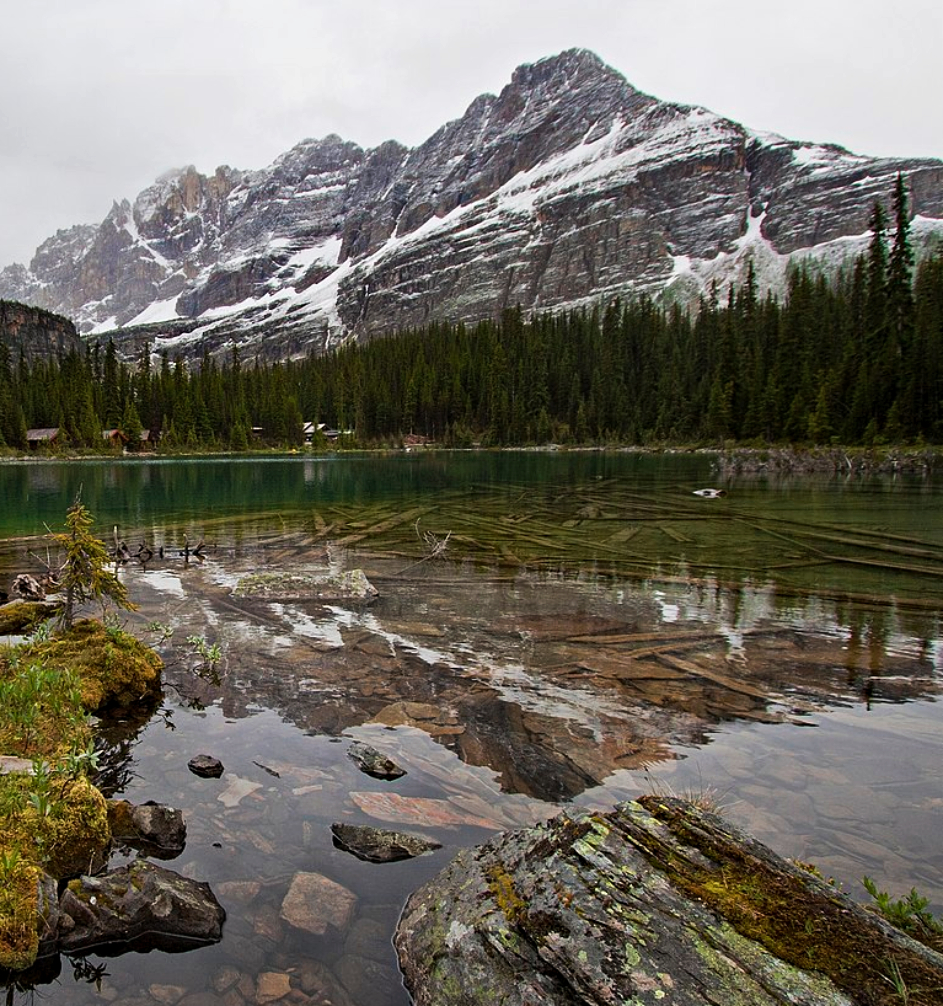
- Mount Schaffer seen from Lake O'Hara

Highest point
- Elevation: 2,691 m (8,829 ft)
- Prominence: 46 m (151 ft)
- Parent peak: Mount Biddle (3320 m)
- Listing: Mountains of British Columbia
- Coordinates: 51°20′40″N 116°20′24″W

Geography
- Location within British Columbia Location within Canada
- Interactive map of Mount Schaffer
- Location: British Columbia, Canada
- District: Kootenay Land District
- Parent range: Bow Range; Canadian Rockies
- Topo map: NTS 82N8 Lake Louise

Geology
- Rock age: Cambrian
- Rock type: sedimentary rock

Climbing
- First ascent: 1909 M. Goddard, W. Richardson
- Easiest route: Scramble class 3

Mount Schaffer is a 2,691-metre (8,829-foot) mountain summit located one kilometre (0.62 mi) southwest of Lake O'Hara in Yoho National Park, in the Bow Range of the Canadian Rockies of British Columbia, Canada. Its nearest higher peak is Mount Biddle, 3.2 km (2.0 mi) to the southeast. Mount Schaffer is situated 3.5 kilometres (2.2 mi) west of the Continental Divide, and 12 kilometres (7.5 mi) southeast of Field, British Columbia.

== History ==
The mountain was named in 1909 for Mary Schäffer Warren (1861–1939), an American-Canadian naturalist, illustrator, photographer, and writer. Other reports have it being named in 1894 by Samuel E.S. Allen for Dr. Charles Schäffer (1838–1903), who was Mary's husband.

The first ascent of the Mount Schaffer was made in 1909 by M. Goddard and W. Richardson.

The mountain's name was made official in 1924 when approved by the Geographical Names Board of Canada.

== Geology ==
Mount Schaffer is composed of sedimentary rock laid down during the Precambrian to Jurassic periods. Formed in shallow seas, this sedimentary rock was pushed east and over the top of younger rock during the Laramide orogeny.

== Climate ==
Based on the Köppen climate classification, Mount Schaffer is located in a subarctic climate zone with cold, snowy winters, and mild summers. Temperatures can drop below −20 °C (−4 °F) with wind chill factors below −30 °C (−22 °F). Precipitation runoff from Mount Schaffer drains into tributaries of the Kicking Horse River which is a tributary of the Columbia River.

== Gallery ==
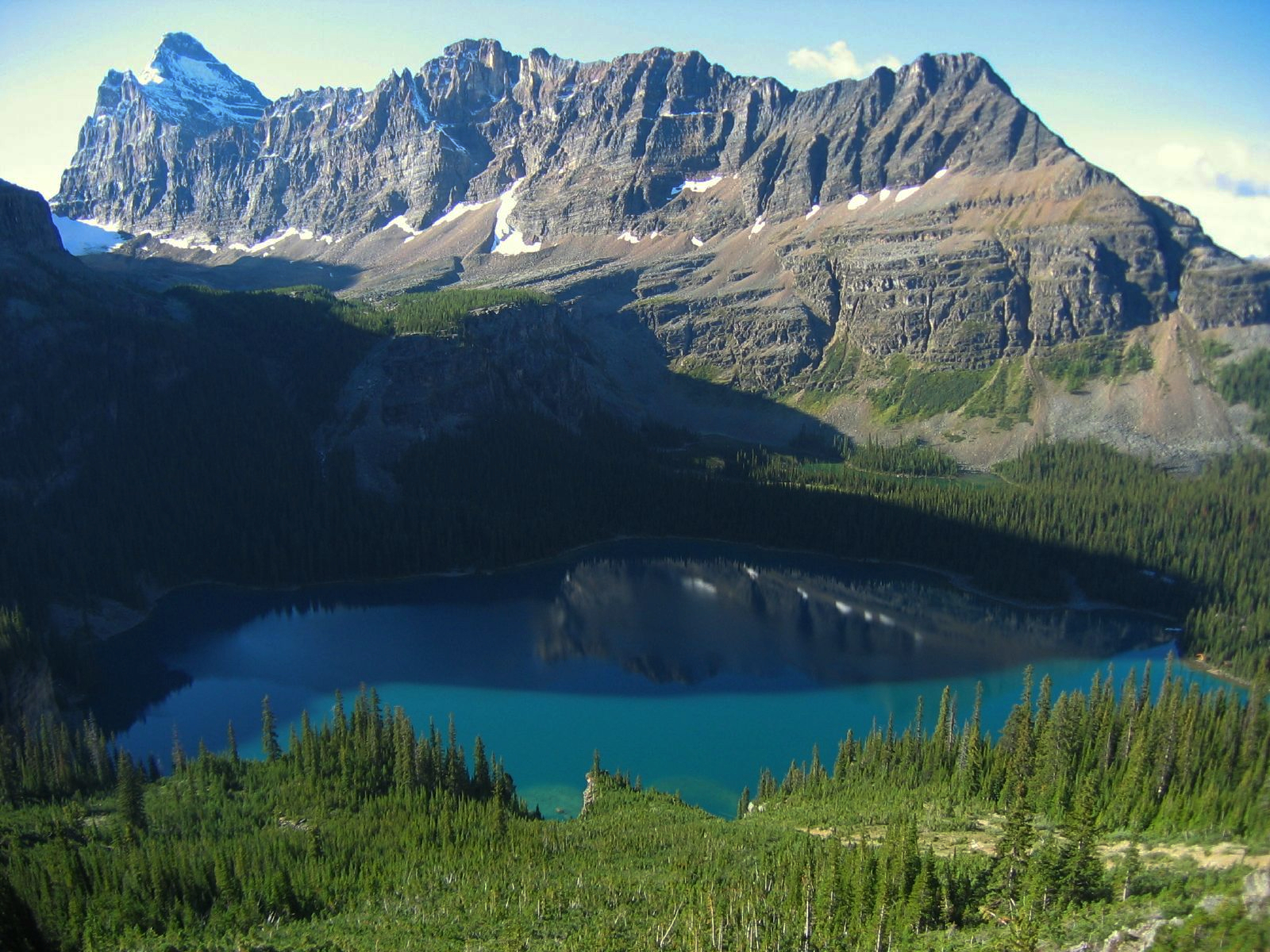
Mount Schäffer far right, Mount Biddle upper left corner

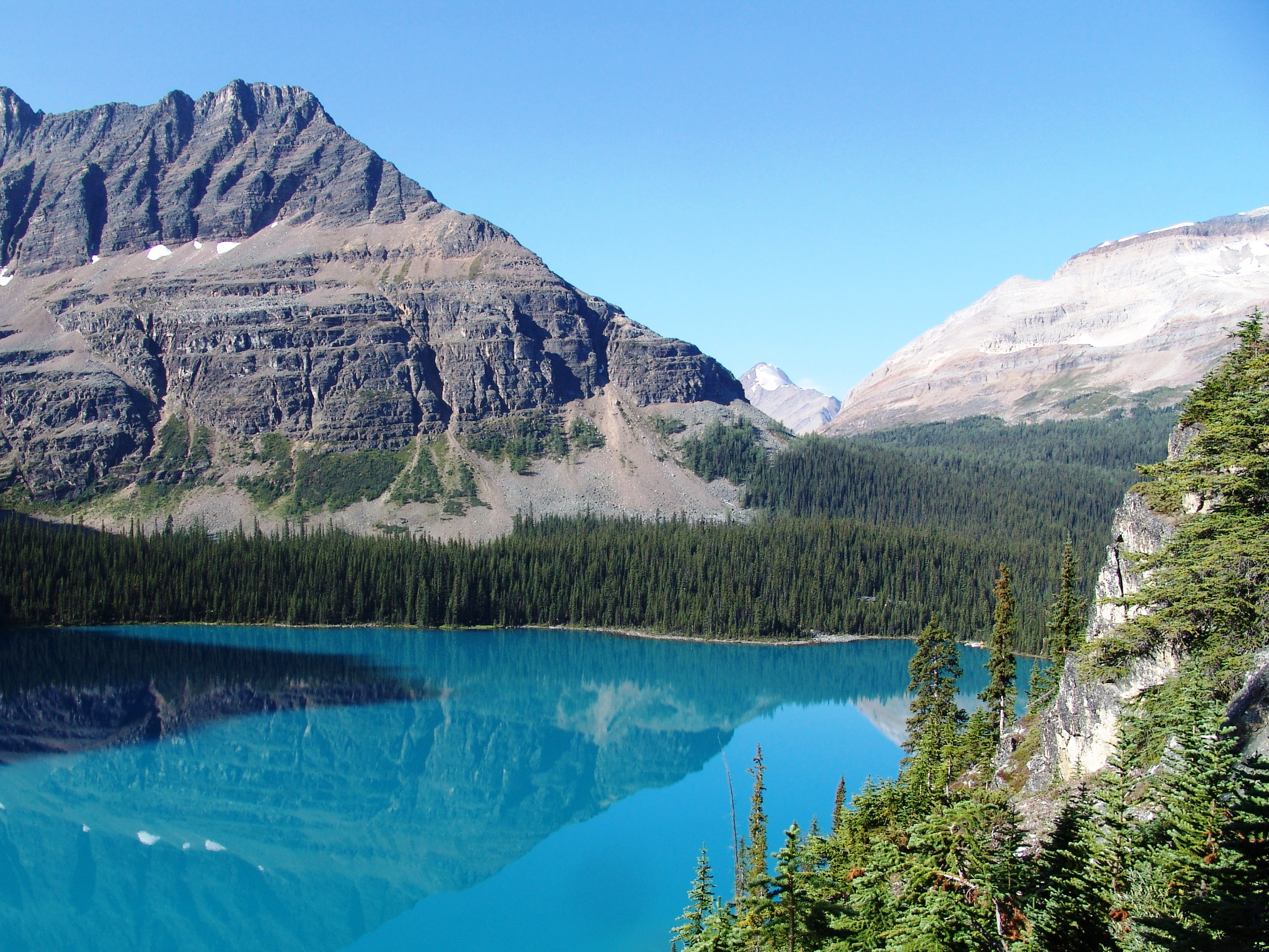
Mount Schäffer seen above Lake O'Hara

== See also ==
- Geography of British Columbia
