= Cathedral Mountain (Yoho) =

Mountain in Yoho NP, BC, Canada

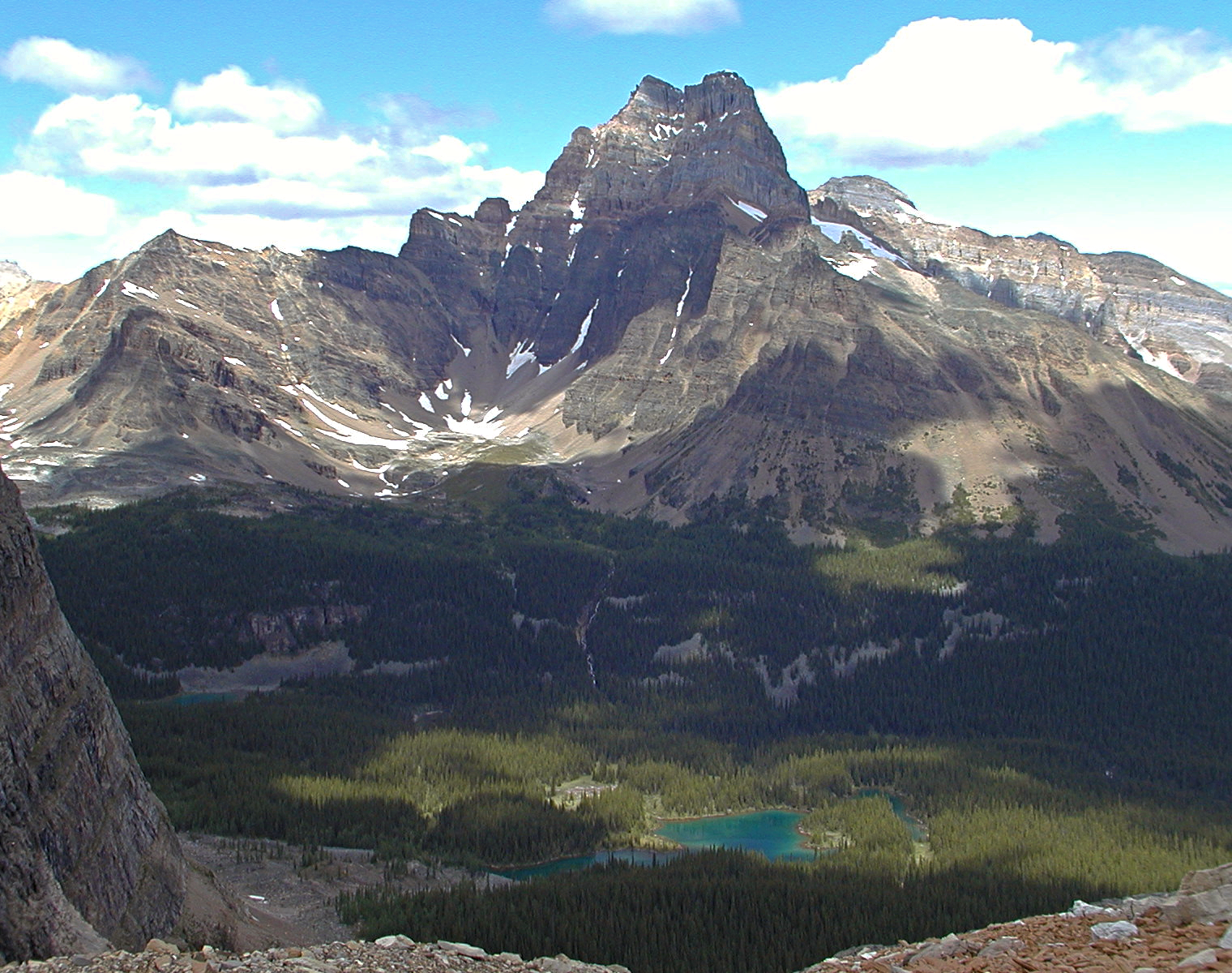
- Cathedral Mountain

Highest point
- Elevation: 3,189 m (10,463 ft)
- Prominence: 467 m (1,532 ft)
- Parent peak: Mount Stephen (3199 m)
- Listing: Mountains of British Columbia
- Coordinates: 51°23′48″N 116°23′25″W

Geography
- Location within British Columbia Location within Canada
- Interactive map of Cathedral Mountain
- Location: British Columbia, Canada
- District: Kootenay Land District
- Parent range: Canadian Rockies
- Topo map: NTS 82N8 Lake Louise

Geology
- Rock age: Cambrian
- Rock type: sedimentary rock

Climbing
- First ascent: 1901 James Outram, Joseph Bossoney, and Christian Klucker (guide)

Cathedral Mountain is a 3,189-metre (10,463-foot) complex massif located six kilometres northwest of Lake O'Hara in Yoho National Park, in the Canadian Rockies of British Columbia, Canada. Its shape and structure conjures up a resemblance to a gothic cathedral that has inspired many artists, including Group of Seven's Arthur Lismer, who painted it in 1928. This picturesque mountain is visible from Highway 1, the Trans-Canada Highway, near Kicking Horse Pass. Its nearest higher peak is Mount Stephen, 3.0 km (1.9 mi) to the west. To prevent damage to its operations, the Canadian Pacific Kansas City railway pumps overflow from Teacup Lake down the west face of Cathedral to minimize the subglacial lake's discharging in a phenomenon known as a jökulhlaup.

== History ==
The name Cathedral Mountain was in use as early as 1884 and appeared on George Dawson's 1886 map. The first ascent of Cathedral Mountain was made in 1901 by James Outram, with guides Joseph Bossoney, and Christian Klucker. The mountain's name was officially adopted in 1924 when approved by the Geographical Names Board of Canada.

== Geology ==
Cathedral Mountain is composed of sedimentary rock laid down during the Precambrian to Cambrian periods. Formed in shallow seas, this sedimentary rock was pushed east and over the top of younger rock during the Laramide orogeny.

== Climate ==
Based on the Köppen climate classification, Cathedral Mountain is in a subarctic climate with cold, snowy winters, and mild summers. Temperatures can drop below −20 °C with wind chill factors below −30. Precipitation runoff from Cathedral Mountain drains into tributaries of the Kicking Horse River which is a tributary of the Columbia River.

== Cathedral Crags ==
Cathedral Crags (3082 m) are striking pinnacles with steep, reddish cliffs located one kilometre northwest of the summit of Cathedral Mountain, near Kicking Horse Pass and the Spiral Tunnels Viewpoint. This rocky feature of Cathedral Mountain was first climbed in 1900 by James Outram, and W. Outram, with Christian Hasler Sr. as guide. The crag's name was officially adopted in 1952 by the Geographical Names Board of Canada.

== Gallery ==
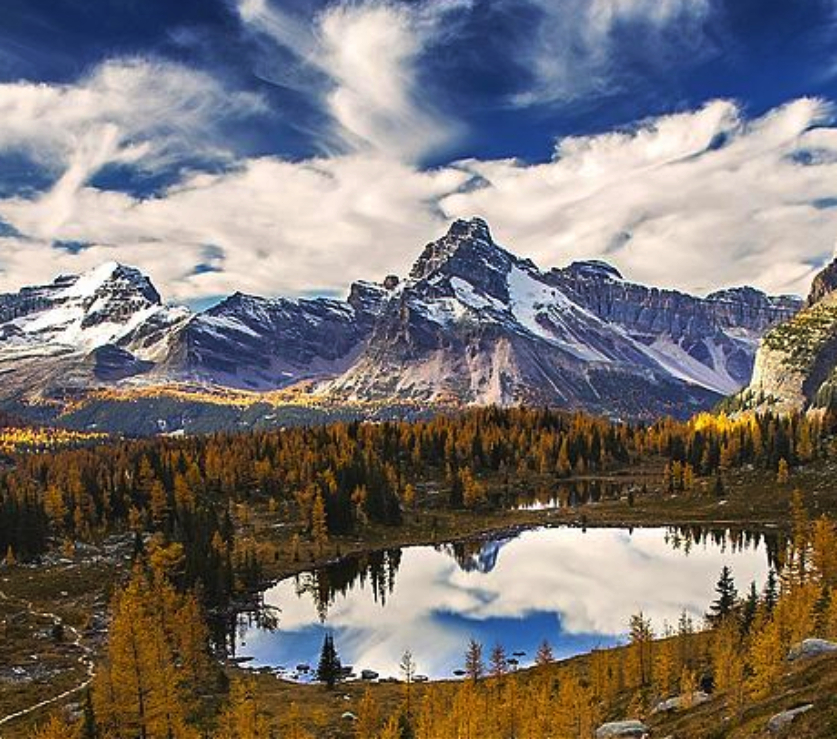
Cathedral Mountain with Hungabee Lake

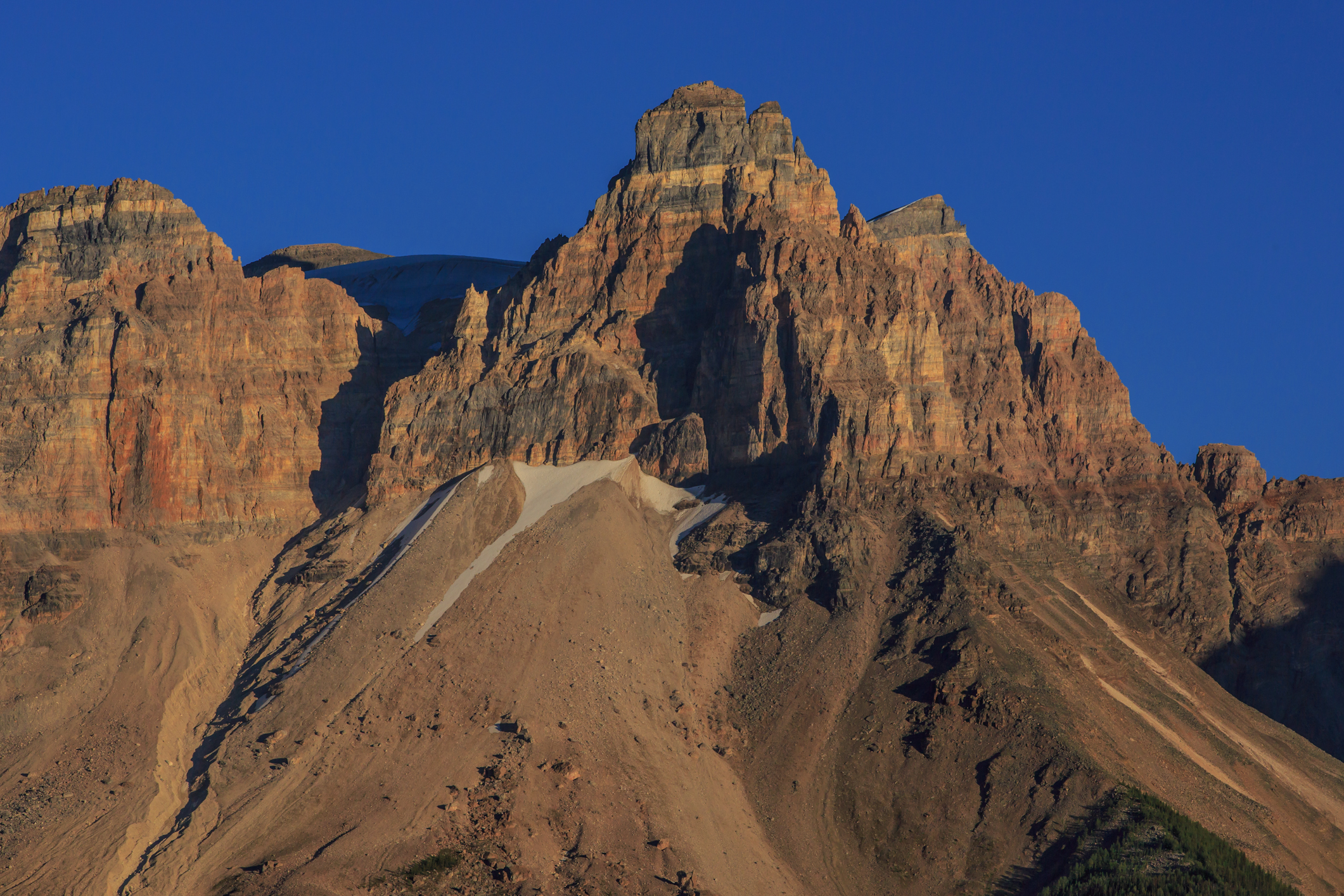
Cathedral Crags

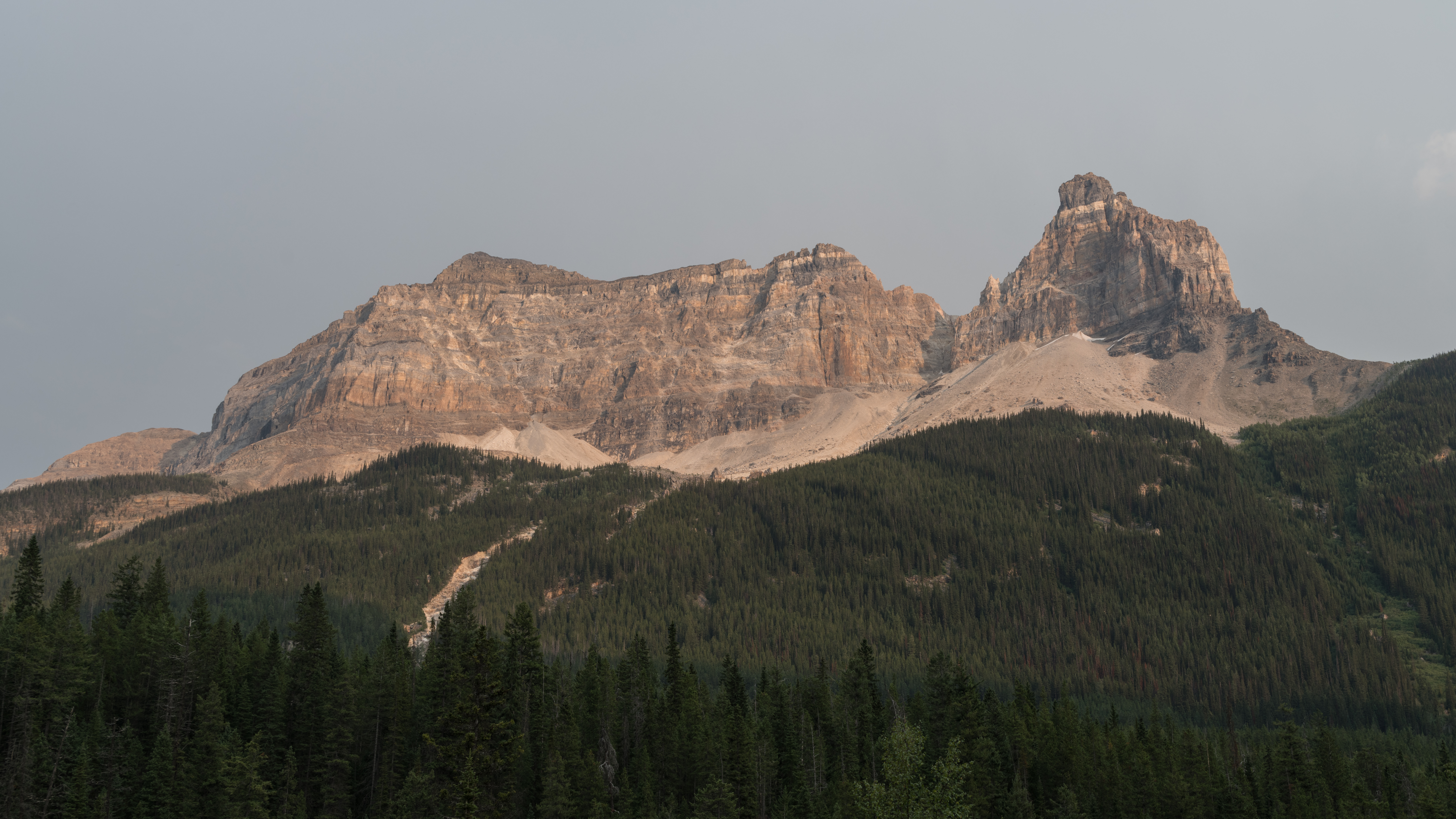
View of Cathedral Mountain, shortly before sunset in August 2024
