= Mount Goodsir =

Mountain in British Columbia, Canada

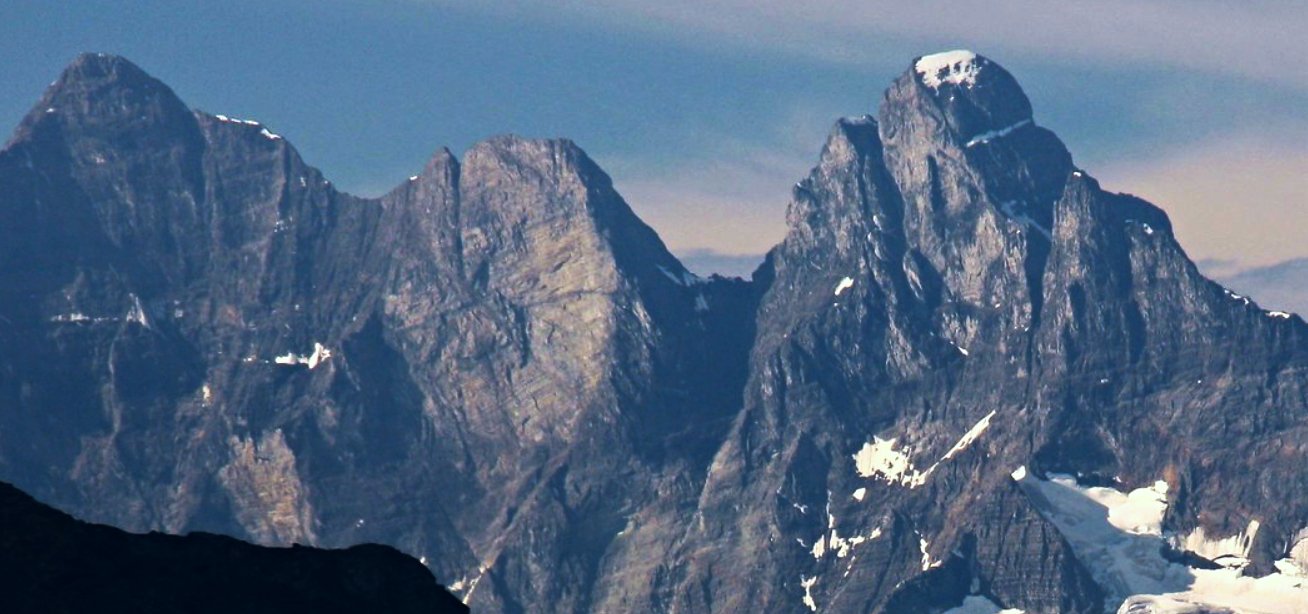

Highest point
- Elevation: 3,567 m (11,703 ft)
- Prominence: 1,887 m (6,191 ft)
- Parent peak: Mount Assiniboine (3616 m)
- Listing: Mountains of British Columbia; Canada highest major peaks 36th; Canada most prominent peak 47th
- Coordinates: 51°12′06″N 116°23′48″W

Geography
- Location within British Columbia
- Country: Canada
- Province: British Columbia
- District: Kootenay Land District
- Park: Yoho National Park
- Parent range: Ottertail Range
- Topo map: NTS 82N1 Mount Goodsir

Climbing
- First ascent: 16 July 1903; Charles E. Fay and Herschel C. Parker, guided by Christian Häsler and Christian Kaufmann
- Easiest route: Southwest ridge of South Tower: hike/climb (Grade III, YDS 5.4)

Mount Goodsir (or the Goodsir Towers) is the highest mountain in the Ottertail Range, a subrange of the Park Ranges in British Columbia. It is located in Yoho National Park, near its border with Kootenay National Park. The mountain has two major summits, the South Tower (the higher summit) and the North Tower, 3,525 metres (11,565 ft).

The mountain was named by James Hector in 1859 after two brothers, John Goodsir, a professor of anatomy at the University of Edinburgh, and Harry Goodsir, a surgeon on the ship HMS Erebus.

The standard route on the South Tower is the southwest ridge, a straightforward but long climb (Grade III), which consists primarily of non-technical terrain, but includes short sections of narrow ridge graded YDS 5.4. Access to any route on either Tower requires a long hike.

== Gallery ==
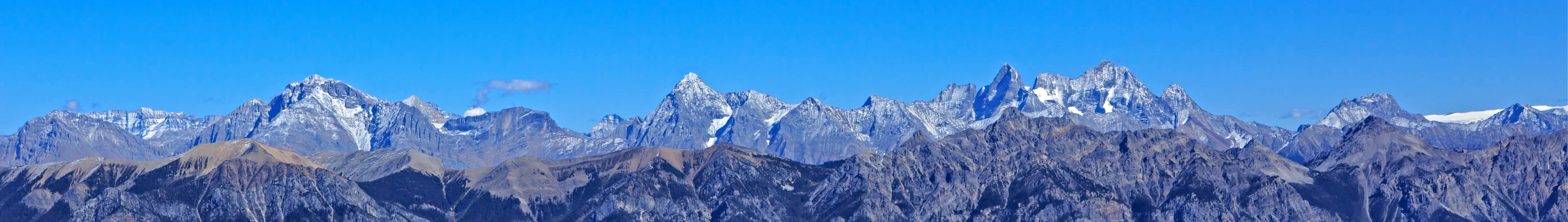
View of Ottertail Range from west with Mount Vaux (left), Chancellor Peak (center), and Mount Goodsir (right)

== See also ==
- Mountain peaks of Canada
- List of mountains in the Canadian Rockies
- List of mountain peaks of North America
- List of mountain peaks of the Rocky Mountains
