= Chancellor Peak =

Mountain summit in British Columbia, Canada

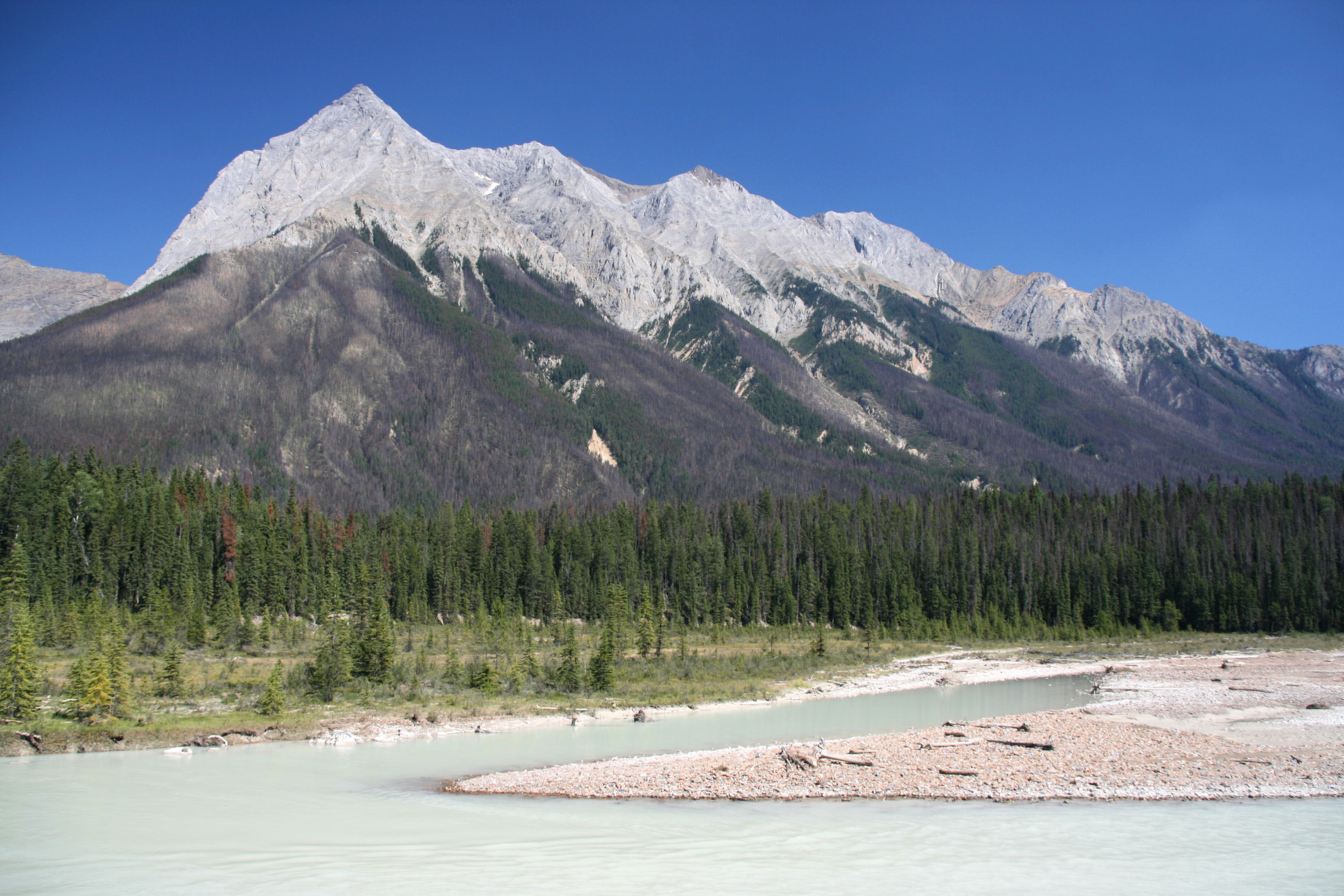
- Chancellor Peak

Highest point
- Elevation: 3,266 m (10,715 ft)
- Prominence: 726 m (2,382 ft)
- Parent peak: Mount Vaux (3310 m)
- Listing: Mountains of British Columbia
- Coordinates: 51°13′27″N 116°30′37″W

Geography
- Location within British Columbia Location within Canada
- Interactive map of Chancellor Peak
- Country: Canada
- Province: British Columbia
- District: Kootenay Land District
- Protected area: Yoho National Park
- Parent range: Ottertail Range; Canadian Rockies
- Topo map: NTS 82N2 McMurdo

Geology
- Rock age: Cambrian
- Rock type: sedimentary rock

Climbing
- First ascent: 1901 James Outram, J.H. Scattergood, G.M. Weed, Christian Hasler Sr.
- Easiest route: Mountaineering

Chancellor Peak is a 3,266-metre (10,715-foot) mountain summit located in Yoho National Park, in the Canadian Rockies of British Columbia, Canada. Its nearest higher peak is Mount Vaux, 4.0 km (2.5 mi) to the north-northwest. Both are part of the Ottertail Range. Chancellor Peak is a landmark in the Kicking Horse River valley and can be seen from the Trans-Canada Highway midway between Golden and Field.

== History ==
The mountain was named in 1898 to honor Sir John Alexander Boyd (1837–1916), who was Chancellor of the High Court of Justice of the Province of Ontario.

The first ascent of Chancellor Peak was made on July 30, 1901 by James Outram, J. Henry Scattergood, and George M. Weed, with Christian Hasler Sr. as guide. Outram wrote of it: "The Chancellor, that mighty pyramid from whose frowning precipices, black and forbidding, loom aloft nigh upon 7,000 feet above the Kicking Horse River cannot fail to impress the traveler with a sense of awe and grandeur, as he approaches eastward from the grim gateway of the lower canyon."

The mountain's name was officially adopted in 1924 when approved by the Geographical Names Board of Canada.

== Geology ==
Chancellor Peak is composed of sedimentary rock laid down during the Cambrian period. Formed in shallow seas, this sedimentary rock was pushed east and over the top of younger rock during the Laramide orogeny.

== Climate ==
Based on the Köppen climate classification, Chancellor Peak is located in a subarctic climate with cold, snowy winters, and mild summers. Temperatures can drop below −20 °C with wind chill factors below −30 °C. Precipitation runoff from Chancellor Peak drains into the Kicking Horse River which is a tributary of the Columbia River.

== Gallery ==
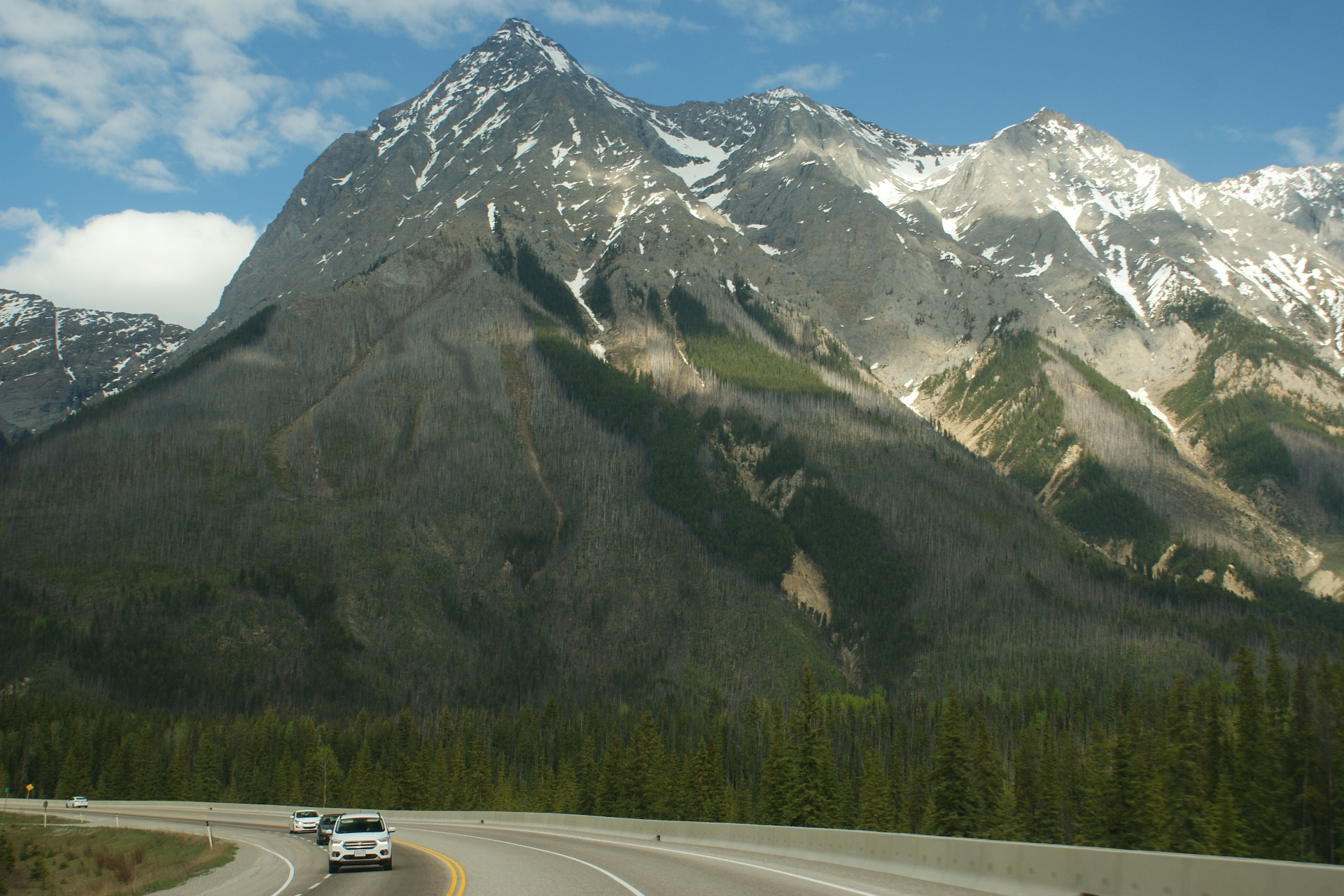
Chancellor Peak seen from Highway 1

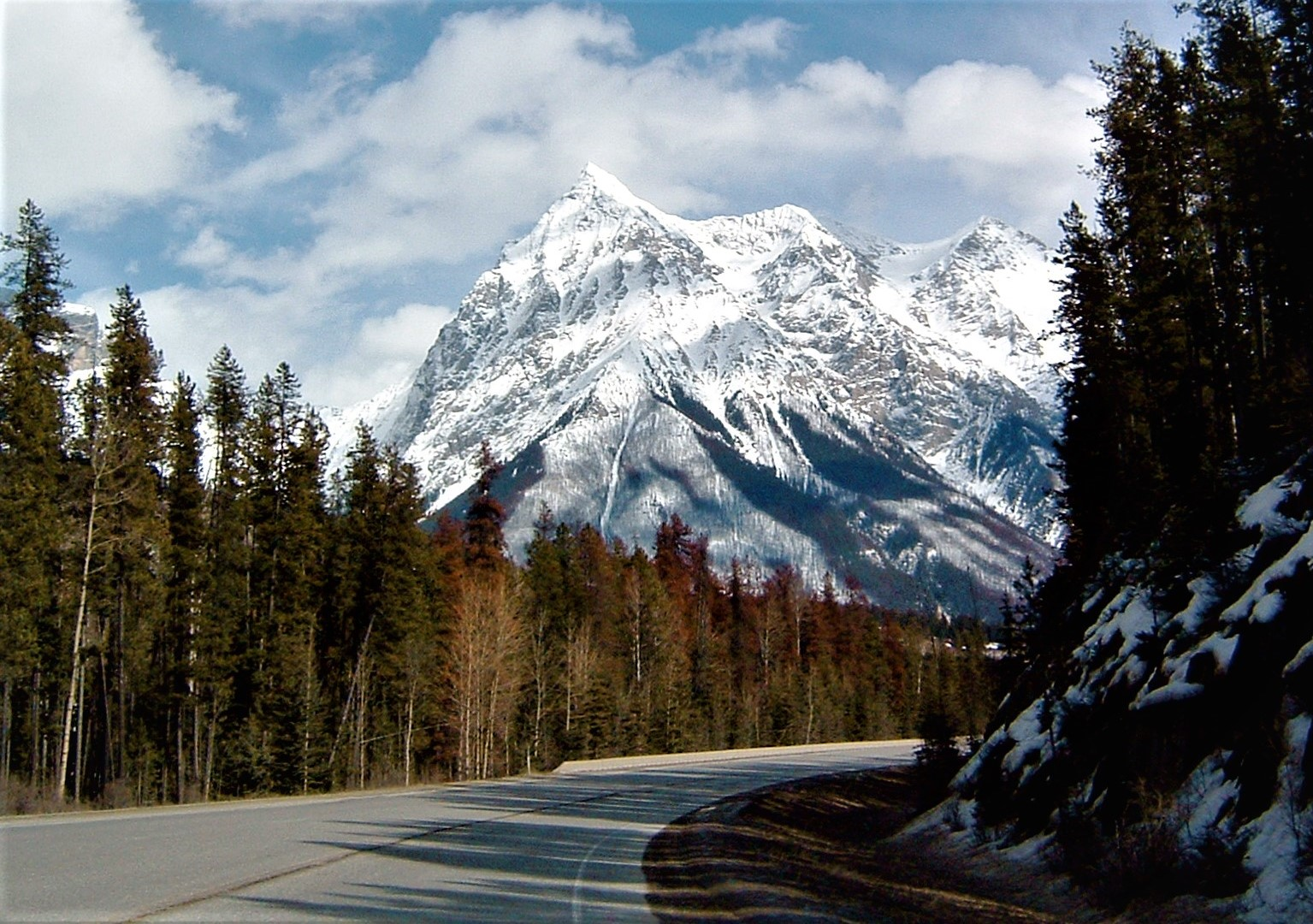
Chancellor Peak seen from Highway 1

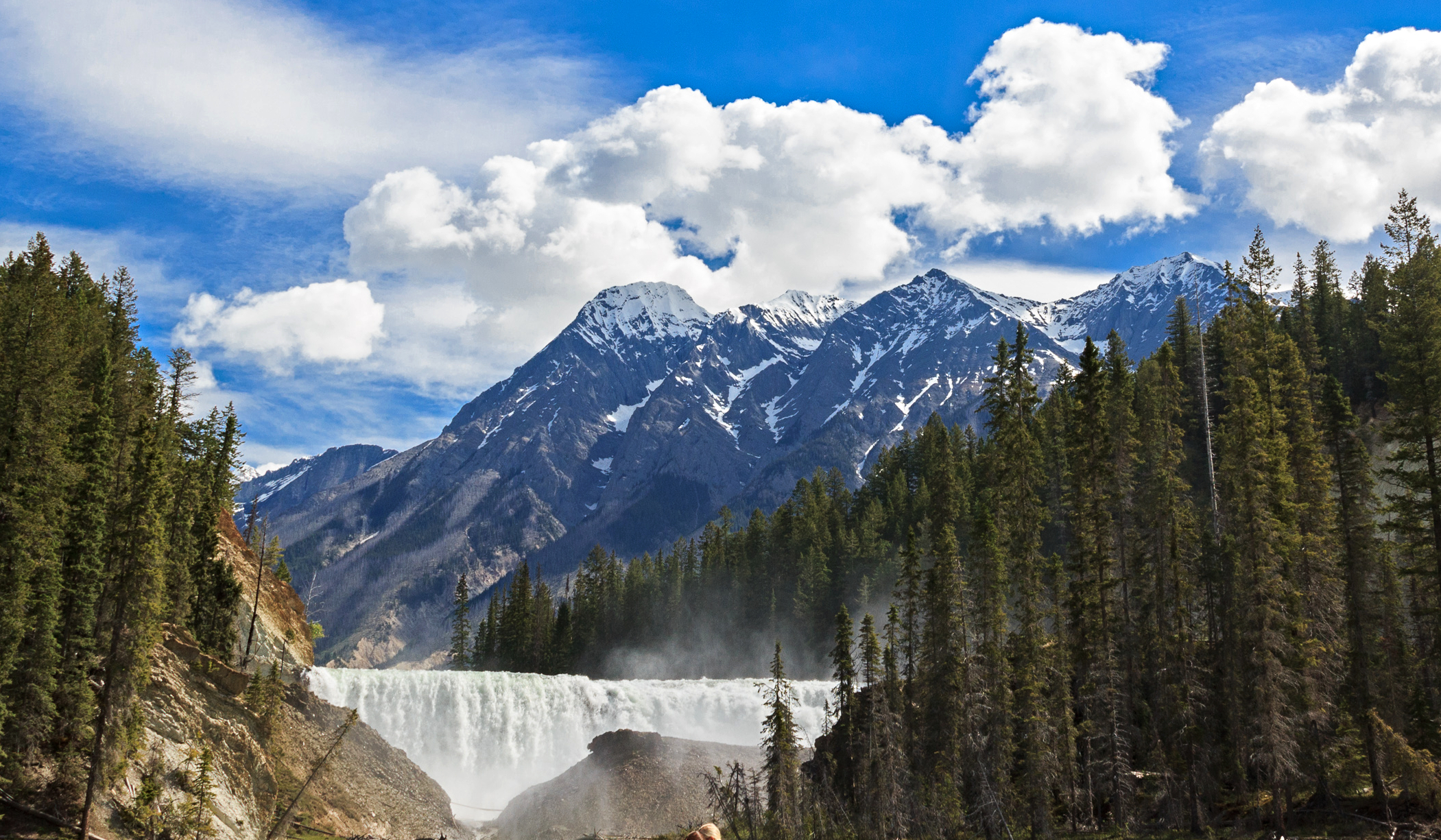
Chancellor Peak seen with Wapta Falls

== See also ==
- List of mountains in the Canadian Rockies
- Geography of British Columbia
