= Aquila Mountain (Alberta) =

Mountain in Alberta, Canada

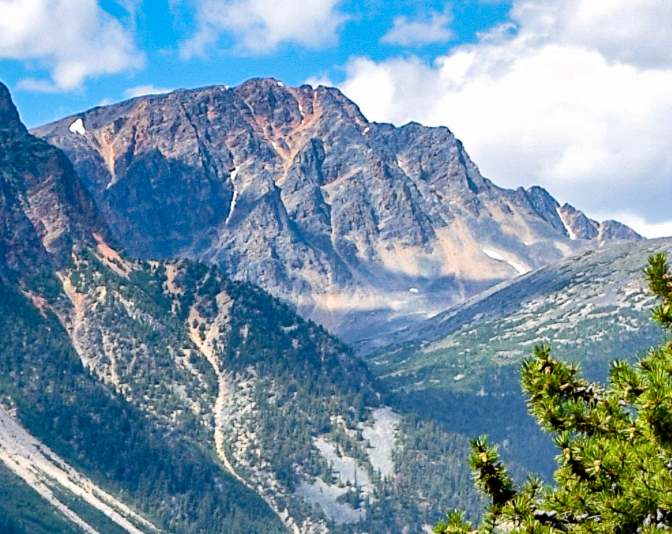
- Aquila Mountain seen from Cavell Meadows

Highest point
- Elevation: 2,840 m (9,320 ft)
- Prominence: 500 m (1,600 ft)
- Parent peak: Oldhorn Mountain 2,990 m
- Listing: Mountains of Alberta
- Coordinates: 52°44′12″N 118°06′34″W

Geography
- Location within Alberta Location within Canada
- Country: Canada
- Province: Alberta
- Protected area: Jasper National Park
- Parent range: Canadian Rockies
- Topo map: NTS 83D9 Amethyst Lakes

Aquila Mountain is a 2,840-metre (9,320-foot) mountain summit located in the Athabasca River valley of Jasper National Park, in the Canadian Rockies of Alberta, Canada. Aquila Mountain was so named on account of eagles in the area, aquila meaning "eagle" in Latin. The mountain's name was officially adopted on March 5, 1935 when approved by the Geographical Names Board of Canada. Precipitation runoff from Aquila Mountain drains into Portal Creek and Astoria River which are both tributaries of the Athabasca River. Aquila Mountain can be seen from the Icefields Parkway, weather permitting. Lectern Peak is situated one kilometre to the north, and Franchère Peak two km south.

== Climate ==
Based on the Köppen climate classification, Aquila Mountain is located in a subarctic climate zone with cold, snowy winters, and mild summers. Winter temperatures can drop below −20 °C with wind chill factors below −30 °C.

== Geology ==
The mountain is composed of sedimentary rock laid down during the Precambrian to Jurassic periods and pushed east and over the top of younger rock during the Laramide orogeny.

== See also ==
- Geography of Alberta
