= James Outram (mountaineer) =

British clergyman and mountaineer

James Outram (13 October 1864 – 12 March 1925) was a British clergyman, who made many first ascents in the Canadian Rockies in the early 1900s.

== Biography ==
Outram was born in London, England, the son of Sir Francis Boyd Outram, and grandson of Sir James Outram, both of India fame. He was educated at Haileybury College and Pembroke College, Cambridge, where he gained his degree of Master of Arts. He came to the Canadian Rockies in 1900, and devoted himself to Alpine pursuits for some years, making his headquarters in Calgary. He ascended the hitherto unclimbed Mount Assiniboine in 1901. He contested for first ascents of the highest summits of the Rockies with J. Norman Collie, including the pursuit of the mythical giants Hooker and Brown.

His climbing accomplishments include:

- 1900 – ascent of Cascade Mountain 2,998 metres (9,836 ft)
- 1901 – first ascents (guided) of Mount Assiniboine 3,618 metres (11,870 ft), Mount Vaux 3,310 metres (10,860 ft), Chancellor Peak 3,266 metres (10,715 ft), and Cathedral Mountain 3,189 metres (10,463 ft).
- 1902 – first ascents guided by Christian Kaufmann of Mount Bryce 3,507 metres (11,506 ft), Mount Columbia 3,747 metres (12,293 ft), Mount Forbes 3,612 metres (11,850 ft), and Mount Wilson 3,260 metres (10,700 ft).

Outram wrote a book about his adventures called In the Heart of the Canadian Rockies, first published in 1905, and several magazine articles, all dealing with mountaineering.

In 1920, Mount Outram in Banff National Park was named in his honour.

In 1921 he married Lillian Mary Balfour, daughter of the late Joseph Balfour. They had no children. He was a member of the Anglican Church, in the congregation of St. Stephens, Calgary.

Outram was a dedicated Orangeman and a member of the Vermilion, Alberta, Loyal Orange Lodge Number 2078 in 1915. In 1916 he was elected the Worshipful Master of that lodge and in 1917 and 1918 he was elected the Worshipful Master for Victoria County, Alberta. In 1918 he was elected the Right Worshipful Grand Master of the Grand Orange Lodge of Alberta, and again re-elected in 1919 and 1920. He was also a member of the Vermilion lodge of the Ladies Orange Benevolent Association.

Outram also belonged to another Protestant fraternal organization known as the Royal Black Knights of the Camp of Israel where he served as Grand Registrar of the Grand Black Chapter of Alberta for 1921–1925. He was a knight in the Mannville Royal Black Preceptory, Number 948.

Outram died in Victoria, British Columbia on 12 March 1925 after several months of illness.
