= Ottertail Range =

Mountain range in British Columbia, Canada

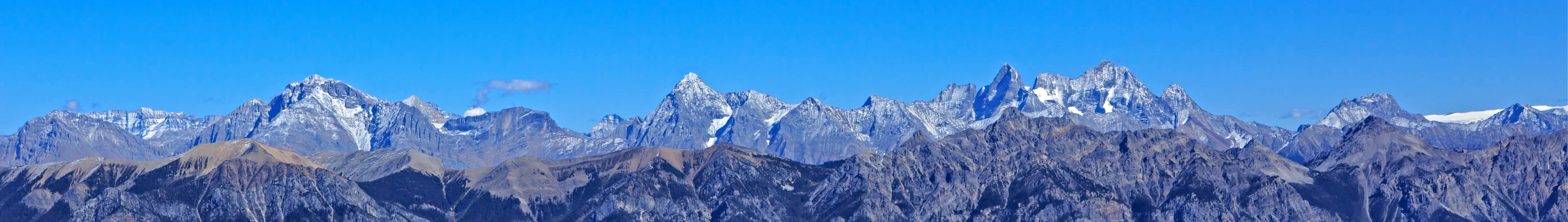
- Mt. Vaux, Chancellor Peak, Goodsir Towers

Highest point
- Peak: Mount Goodsir
- Elevation: 3,567 m (11,703 ft)
- Listing: Mountains of British Columbia
- Coordinates: 51°15′31″N 116°31′48″W

Geography
- Location within British Columbia
- Country: Canada
- Province: British Columbia
- Range coordinates: 51°14′59″N 116°30′04″W
- Parent range: Canadian Rockies
- Topo map: NTS 82N1 Mount Goodsir

The Ottertail Range is a mountain range of the Canadian Rockies in British Columbia, Canada. It is located south of the Ottertail River and east of the Kicking Horse River.

== List of mountains ==
This range includes the following mountains and peaks:

Rank	Mountain / Peak	Elevation		Prominence		FA	Coordinates
Rank	Mountain / Peak	m	ft	m	ft	FA	Coordinates
1	Mount Goodsir	3,567	11,703	1,887	6,191	1903	51°12′24″N 116°24′16″W
2	Mount Vaux	3,310	10,860	830	2,720	1901	51°15′31″N 116°31′48″W
3	Chancellor Peak	3,266	10,715	726	2,382	1901	51°13′27″N 116°30′37″W
4	Sentry Peak	3,257	10,686	242	794	Unk	51°11′44″N 116°22′58″W
5	Mount Ennis	3,122	10,243	147	482	1906	51°15′29″N 116°30′6″W
6	Mount Hurd	3,000	9,800	355	1,165	1948	51°17′6″N 116°32′11″W
7	Zinc Mountain	2,983	9,787				
8	Butwell Peak	2,939	9,642				
9	Allan Peak	2,911	9,551				
9	Hanbury Peak	2,911	9,551				
11	Aquila Mountain	2,860	9,380	160	520	Unk	51°11′27″N 116°29′41″W
12	Clawson Peak	2,655	8,711				
13	Garnet Mountain	2,332	7,651				
