= Mount Vaux =

Mountain summit in Canada

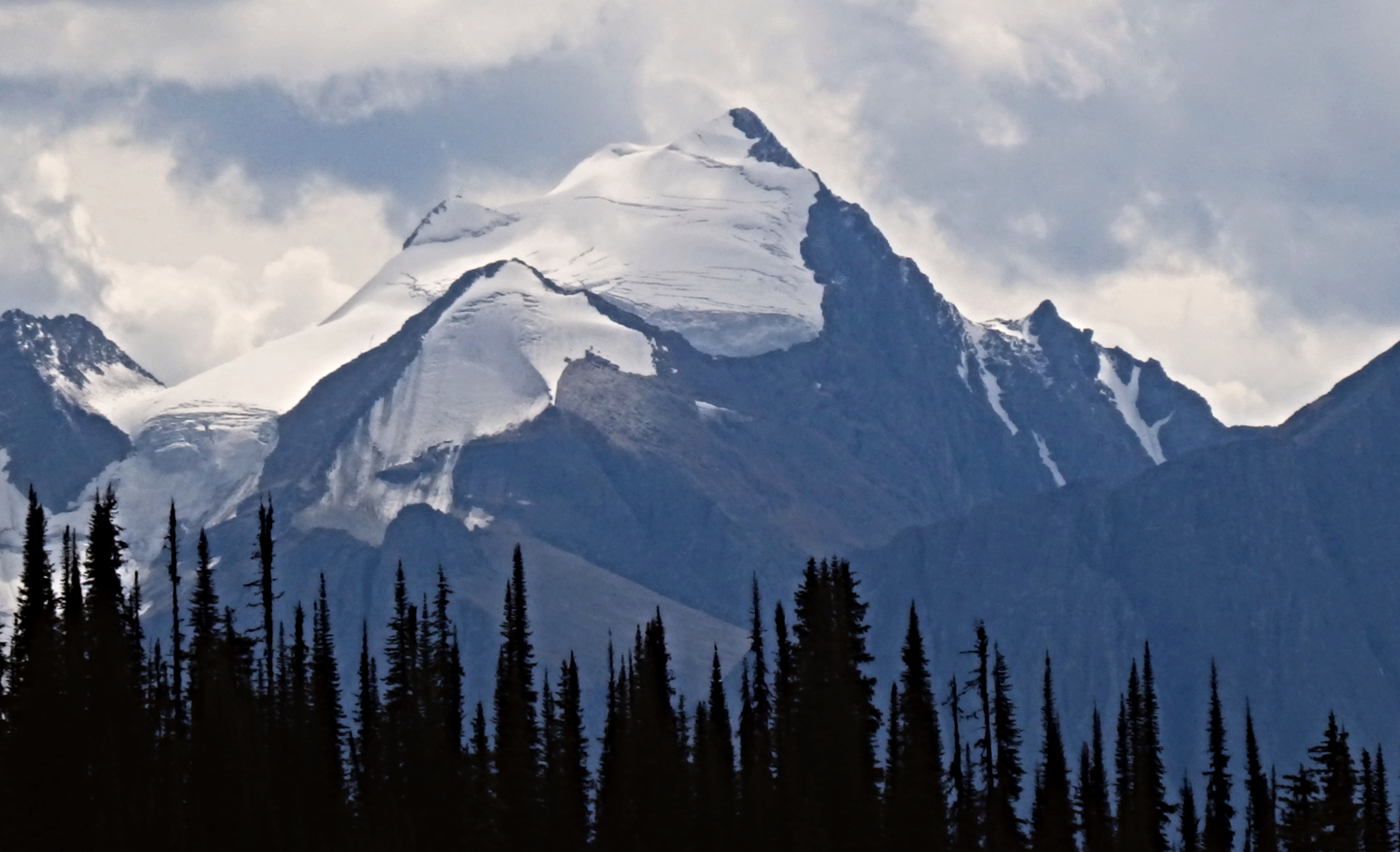
- North aspect of Mount Vaux and Hanbury Glacier

Highest point
- Elevation: 3,310 m (10,860 ft)
- Prominence: 830 m (2,720 ft)
- Parent peak: Mount Goodsir (3567 m)
- Listing: Mountains of British Columbia
- Coordinates: 51°15′31″N 116°31′48″W

Geography
- Location within British Columbia Location within Canada
- Interactive map of Mount Vaux
- Country: Canada
- Province: British Columbia
- District: Kootenay Land District
- Protected area: Yoho National Park
- Parent range: Ottertail Range; Canadian Rockies
- Topo map: NTS 82N7 Golden

Geology
- Rock age: Cambrian
- Rock type: sedimentary rock

Climbing
- First ascent: 1901 Charles E. Fay, James Outram, J. Henry Scattergood, Christian Hasler Sr.

Mount Vaux is a 3,310-metre (10,860-foot) mountain summit located in the Kicking Horse River valley of Yoho National Park, in the Ottertail Range of the Canadian Rockies in British Columbia, Canada. Its nearest higher peak is Mount Goodsir, 11.0 km (6.8 mi) to the southeast. Mount Vaux can be seen from Highway 1, the Trans-Canada Highway, which traverses the western foot of the mountain, as well as from Emerald Lake. Vaux is pronounced Vox, rhymes with box.

== History ==
The mountain was named in 1858 by James Hector for his friend William Sandys Wright Vaux (1818–1885), a resident antiquarian at the British Museum who helped secure funds to support Hector's Palliser Expedition report. The mountain's name was officially adopted in 1924 when approved by the Geographical Names Board of Canada. The first ascent of the mountain was made in 1901 by Charles E. Fay, James Outram, and J. Henry Scattergood, with Christian Hasler Sr. as guide. Outram described the view of the peak from Emerald Lake in his book, "In the Heart of the Canadian Rockies" as follows, "The drive is a lovely one, particularly where the "long-drawn aisles" of stately firs open out a vista piercing the tall, tapering trees, that form a grand enshadowed avenue nearly a mile in length, beyond which the white sunlit crest of glacier-crowned Mt. Vaux leaps high into the heavens."

== Geology ==
Mount Vaux is composed of sedimentary rock laid down during the Precambrian to Cambrian periods. Formed in shallow seas, this sedimentary rock was pushed east and over the top of younger rock during the Laramide orogeny.

== Climate ==
Based on the Köppen climate classification, Mount Vaux is located in a subarctic climate zone with cold, snowy winters, and mild summers. Winter temperatures can drop below −20 °C with wind chill factors below −30 °C. Precipitation runoff from Mount Vaux drains into tributaries of the Kicking Horse River which is a tributary of the Columbia River.

== Gallery ==
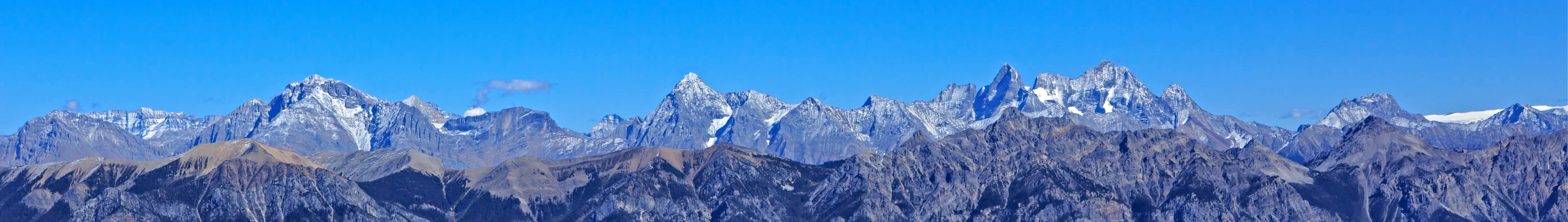
View of Ottertail Range from west with Vaux (left), Chancellor Peak (center), Mount Goodsir (right)

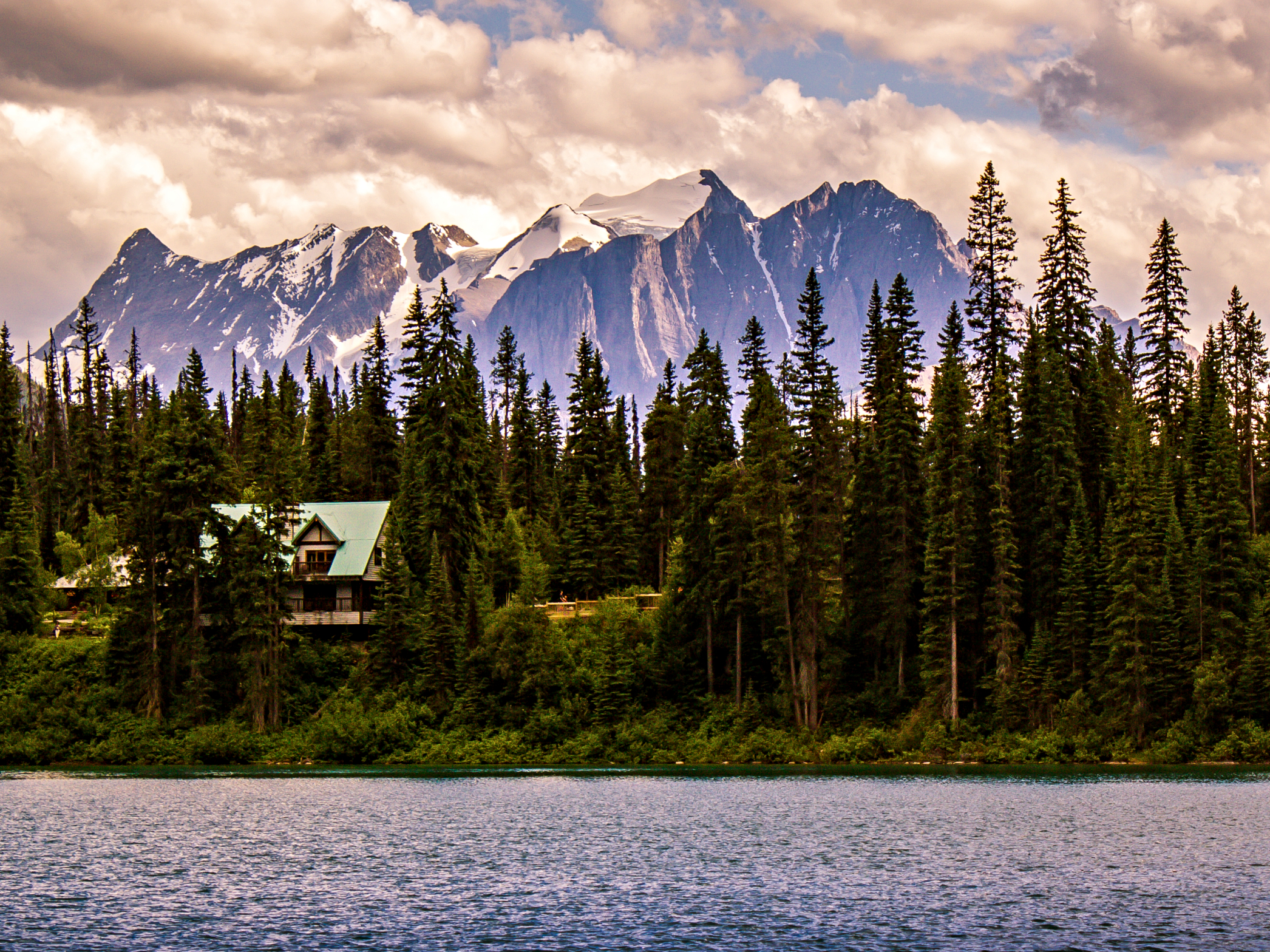
Mount Vaux from Emerald Lake

== See also ==
- Geography of British Columbia
