= Yoho National Park =

National park in British Columbia, Canada

- Parc national Yoho
- IUCN category II (national park)
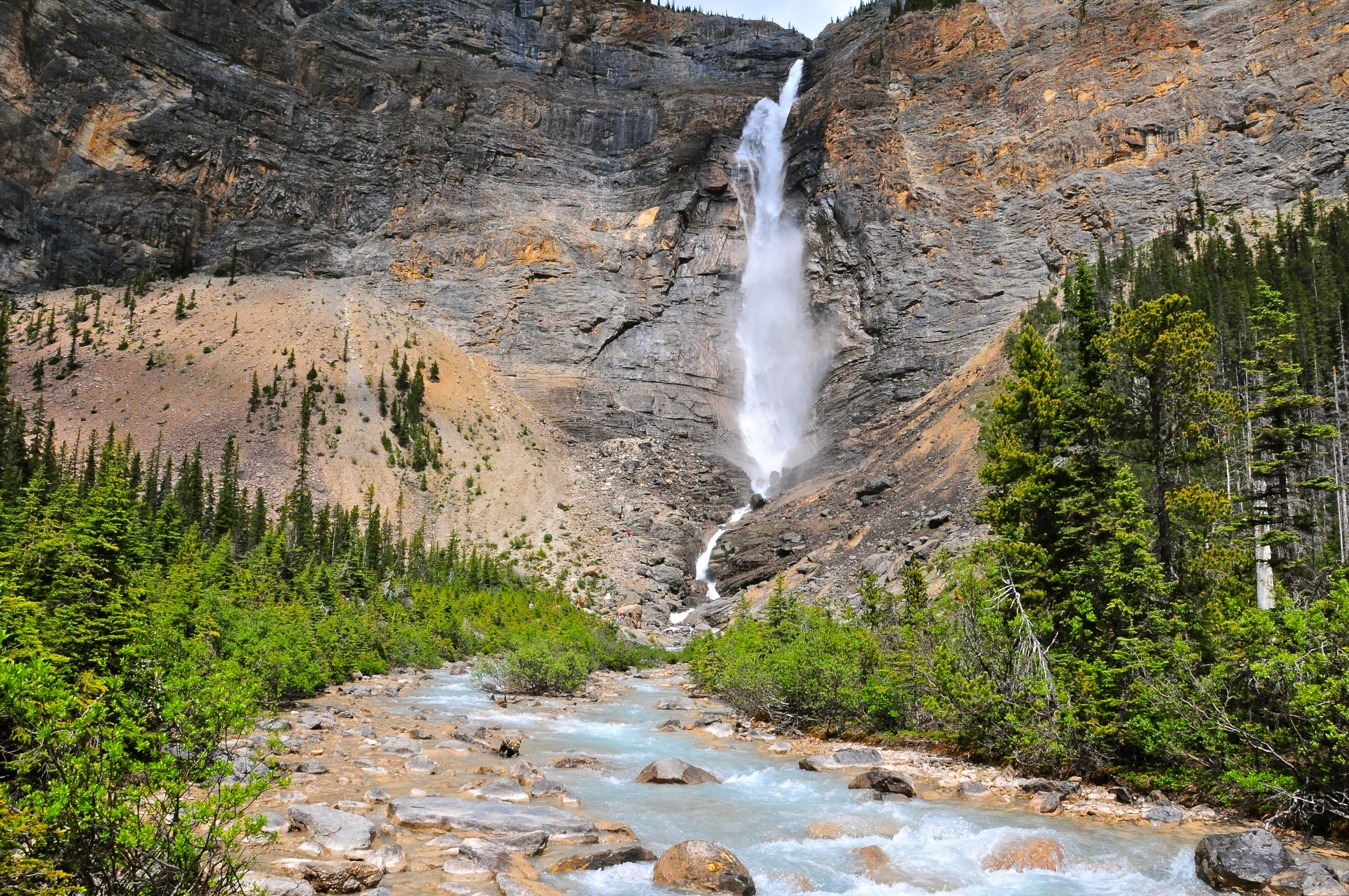
- Takakkaw Falls

- Location within Canada Location within British Columbia
- Interactive map of Yoho National Park
- Location: British Columbia, Canada
- Nearest city: Field
- Coordinates: 51°23′43″N 116°29′12″W
- Area: 1,313 km^{2} (507 sq mi)
- Established: October 10, 1886
- Visitors: 663,878 (in 2022–23)
- Governing body: Parks Canada
- Website: parks.canada.ca/pn-np/bc/yoho

UNESCO World Heritage Site
- Part of: Canadian Rocky Mountain Parks
- Criteria: Natural: (vii), (viii)
- Reference: 304
- Inscription: 1984 (8th Session)

Natural Bridge in Yoho National Park

Yoho National Park (/ˈjoʊhoʊ/ YOH-hoh) is a national park of Canada. It is located within the Rocky Mountains along the western slope of the Continental Divide of the Americas in southeastern British Columbia, bordered by Kootenay National Park to the south and Banff National Park to the east in Alberta. The park features a spectacular landscape of massive ice fields and mountain peaks, which rank among the highest in the Canadian Rockies.

Yoho covers an area of 1,313 square kilometres (507 sq mi), the smallest of the region's four contiguous national parks, which also include Jasper, Kootenay, and Banff National Parks, as well as three British Columbia provincial parks—Hamber Provincial Park, Mount Assiniboine Provincial Park, and Mount Robson Provincial Park. Together, these parks form the Canadian Rocky Mountain Parks World Heritage Site. Yoho's administrative and visitor centre is in Field, British Columbia, beside the Trans-Canada Highway.

== Etymology ==
The name "Yoho" comes from yo-ho! (also rendered yôhô!), an expression of surprise in the Cree language. In spite of the name's Cree origin, the Cree did not historically inhabit this region and it is not a name given by indigenous people, but was chosen in 1901 by Édouard-Gaston Deville, the Surveyor General of Canada.

== History ==
Yoho National Park is in the traditional territories of the Secwepemc and Ktunaxa First Nations. Before the establishment of the park, the Ktunaxa primarily used the area—specifically, Kicking Horse Pass—to cross the Rockies in order to access bison hunting grounds on the eastern side of the mountains.

The park was created following a trip by Prime Minister John A. Macdonald and his wife Agnes through the Rockies on the newly completed Canadian Pacific Railway, Canada's first transcontinental railroad. On October 10, 1886, two new national parks (then simply referred to as "reserves") were created, the second and third in Canada (Banff Reserve being the first). The new parks were Glacier Reserve, the predecessor to Glacier National Park of Canada, and Mount Stephen Reserve, the predecessor of Yoho National Park.

The area of the new reserve was 256 sq mi (663 km^{2}) in the area around Mount Stephen, and was considerably smaller than the later park. The centerpiece of the park was the Mount Stephen House in Field, British Columbia, a popular stopover on the newly constructed Canadian Pacific Railway.

At this time, many of the mountain areas beyond the Canadian Pacific corridor were completely unexplored by non-native peoples, Emerald Lake having only been discovered by non-natives in 1882. In 1896, German explorer and mountaineer Jean Habel led an expedition up the valley of the North Fork of the Wapta River (later renamed the Yoho River) and was awestruck by the sight of Takakkaw Falls and other natural wonders of the valley. Habel presented his findings to the Appalachian Mountain Club in 1898 and news about the beauty of the area spread rapidly. By 1901, the Canadian Pacific Railway was running magazine advertisements for the recently rechristened Yoho Valley, billing the area as "greater than Yosemite" and offering visitors day trips from Mount Stephen House into the valley, led by experienced Swiss mountain guides.

In 1902, the Canadian government decided to expand the area of the reserve to include the Yoho Valley, as well as rename the park for this feature, changing its name to Yoho Park. The expansion also included areas beyond Mount Stephen and the Yoho Valley, and grew the area of the park considerably, to 828.5 sq mi (2,146 km^{2}), however, this area was reduced to 560 sq mi (1,450 km^{2}) in 1911 and further reduced to 476 sq mi (1,233 km^{2}) in 1922. With the passage of the National Park Act of 1930 that the park would get its current name, Yoho National Park, and also a boundary adjustment that adjusted the area of the park to its current size of 507 sq mi (1,313 km^{2}).

In 1909, while fossil hunting in the park, Charles Doolittle Walcott discovered the Burgess Shale deposit, a deposit of geologically very old rocks that were rich in fossils. Paleontologists would find a fossil record in the Burgess Shale that would revolutionize the understanding of the evolution of complex multicellular organisms, particularly the early animal kingdom. This discovery would further raise the profile of the park and underscore its scientific value alongside its natural beauty.

The contiguous national parks of Banff, Jasper, Kootenay, and Yoho, as well as the Mount Robson, Mount Assiniboine, and Hamber provincial parks, were declared a UNESCO World Heritage Site in 1984.

== Fauna ==
Common species of animals that roam in this park are the timber wolf, coyote, badger, moose, elk, mule deer, mountain goat, golden-mantled ground squirrel, rufous hummingbird, hoary marmot, wolverine, cougar, pika, lynx, grizzly bear, and black bear.

== Climate ==
The weather in the park is localized and changeable. Located on the western side of the continental divide, it receives more precipitation than areas east of the divide. Precipitation in the park increases with elevation. In winter, average temperatures are between 5 and −15 °C (41.0 and 5.0 °F) from the months November to April although temperatures can range between 10 and −35 °C (50.0 and −31.0 °F). The coldest weather usually occurs in the months December to February. In summer, mean temperatures average 12.5 °C (54.5 °F) with an average high of 20 °C (68.0 °F) and an average low of 5 °C (41.0 °F). Snowfall and freezing temperatures can occur during the summertime at altitudes above 1,500 m (4,900 ft).

== Geology ==
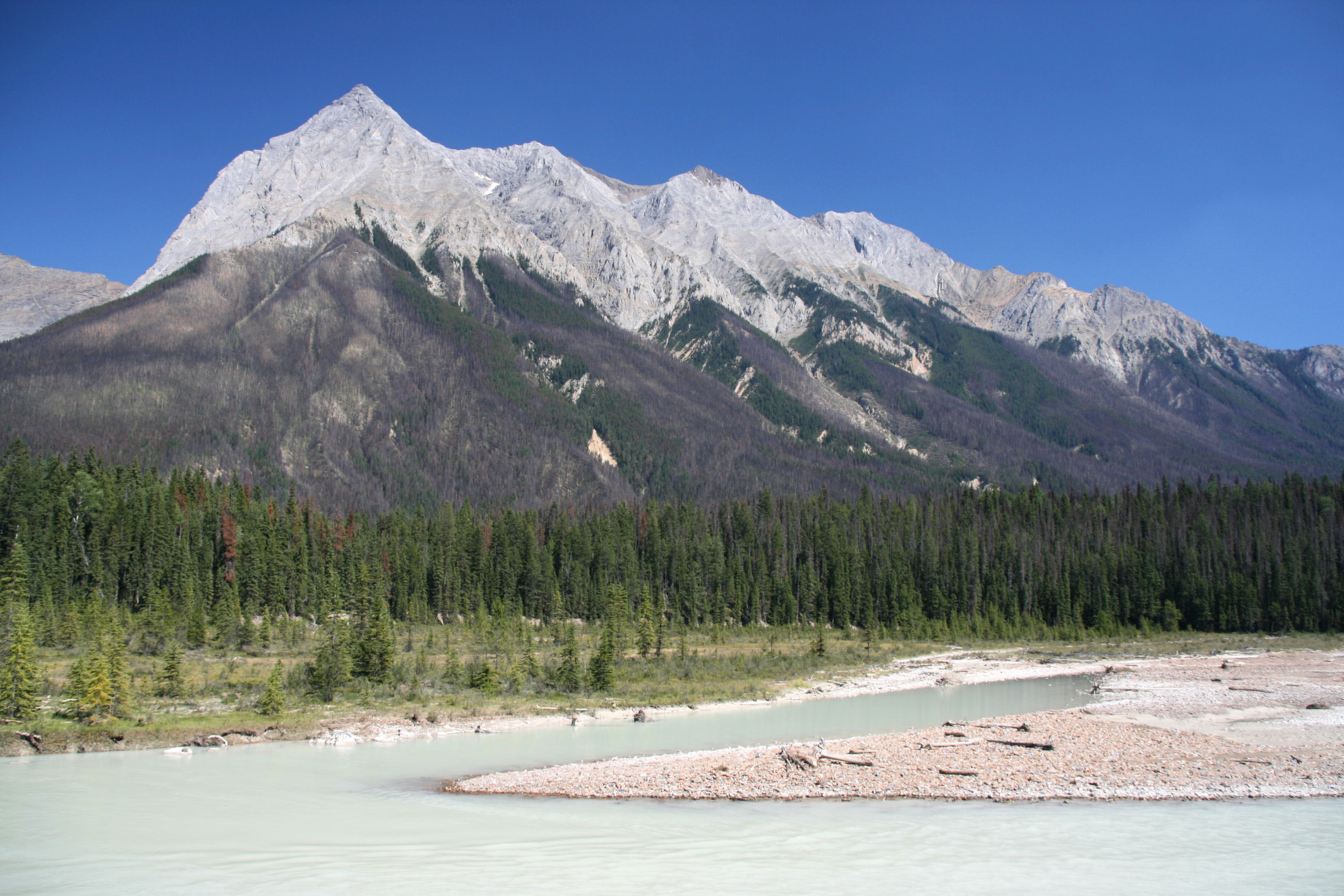
Chancellor Peak and Kicking Horse River

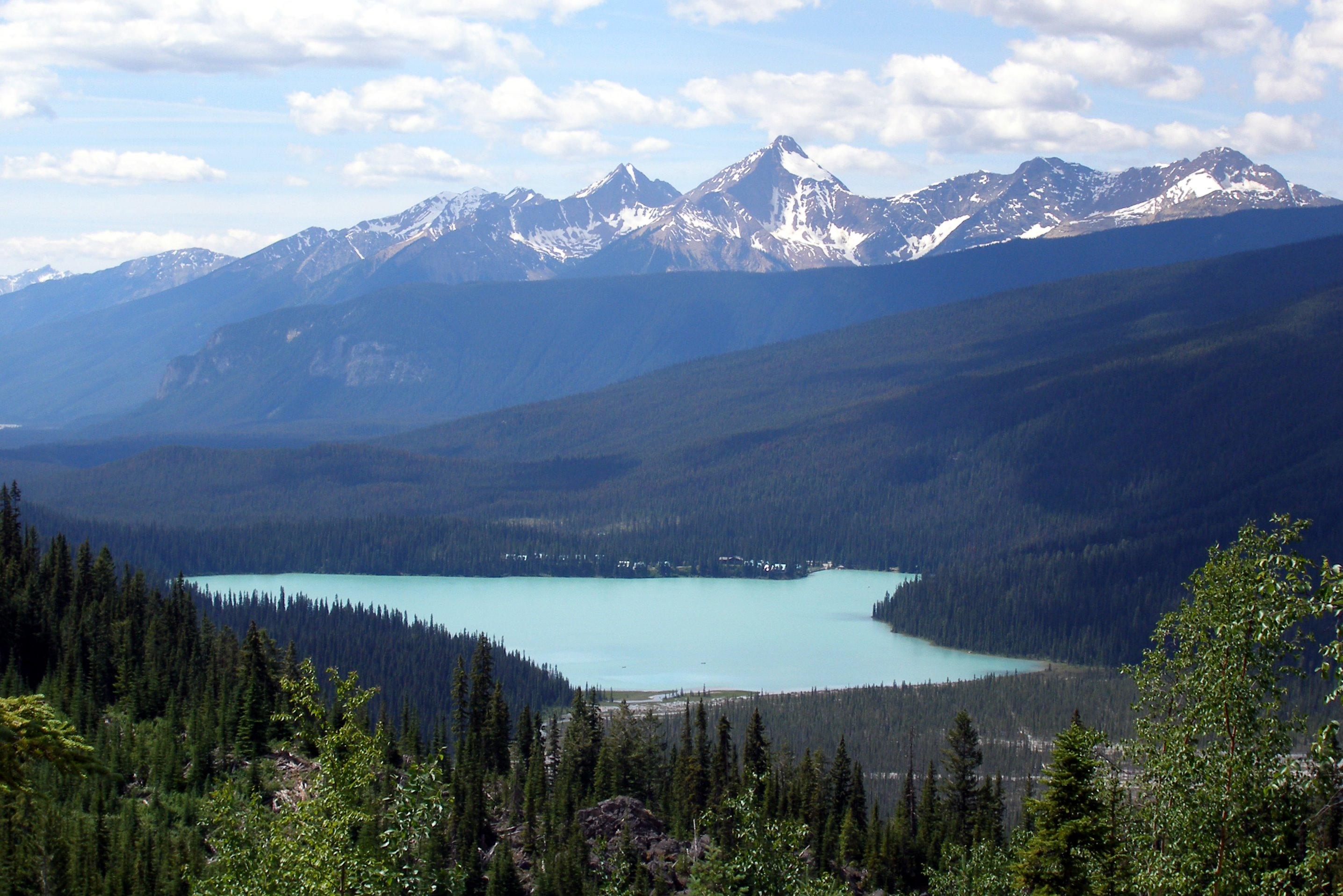
Emerald Lake

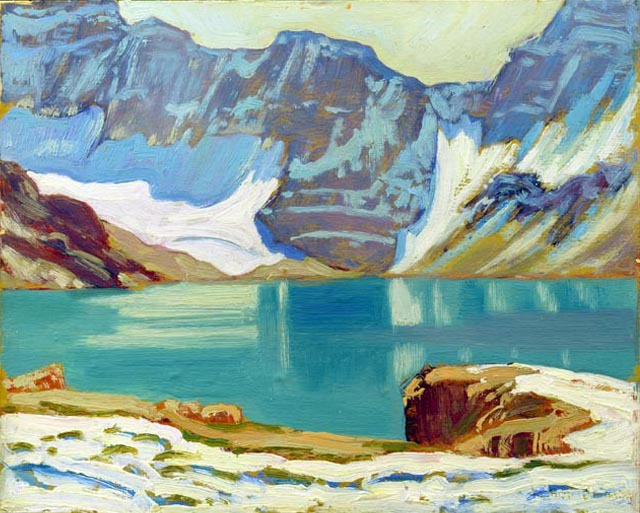
Lake McArthur, 1924 painting by J. E. H. MacDonald

The Canadian Rockies consist of sedimentary rock, with numerous fossil deposits. In particular, the Burgess Shale, in Yoho National Park, has among the world's richest deposits of rare fossils. The Burgess Shale was discovered in 1909 by Charles Doolittle Walcott. Mount Stephen has long been well known for its trilobite deposits, the discovery of which predates the Burgess Shale.

In the southeastern corner of the park is an igneous intrusion known as the Ice River Complex containing deposits of sodalite, an ornamental stone.

The Kicking Horse River, a Canadian Heritage River, originates in the Wapta and Waputik icefields in the park. This river has created a natural bridge through solid rock. This formation is located 3 km (1.9 mi) west of Field, accessible from the road to Emerald Lake.

=== Mountains ===
- Mount Goodsir 3,562 m (11,686 ft), located in the Ottertail Range.
- Mount Vaux 3,310 m (10,860 ft)
- Mount Balfour 3,272 m (10,735 ft)
- Chancellor Peak 3,266 m (10,715 ft)
- Mount Stephen 3,199 m (10,495 ft) is the tallest of the four mountains that surround the town of Field, British Columbia. A portion of the Burgess Shale fossils were discovered on Mount Stephen.
- Cathedral Mountain 3,189 m (10,463 ft)
- The President 3,138 m (10,295 ft)
- Odaray Mountain 3,137 m (10,292 ft)
- The Vice President 3,077 m (10,095 ft)
- Wapta Mountain 2,778 m (9,114 ft)
- Mount Field 2,643 m (8,671 ft)
- Mount Burgess 2,599 m (8,527 ft) is a frequently climbed mountain. For 17 years, it was featured on the Canadian ten-dollar bill.
- Paget Peak 2,560 metres (8,399 ft)

=== Waterfalls ===
- Takakkaw Falls have a total height of 373 metres (1,224 ft), making it the 2nd tallest waterfall in Canada. The main drop of the waterfall has a height of 254 metres (833 ft).
- Wapta Falls is the largest waterfall of the Kicking Horse River, at about 30 metres (98 ft) high and 150 metres (490 ft) wide. Its average flow can reach 254 cubic metres per second (9,000 cu ft/s).

== See also ==
- List of lakes of Yoho National Park
- List of national parks of Canada
