= Peyto =

Peyto may refer to:

- Peyto Lake
- Peyto Peak
- Peyto Glacier
- Peyto Hut
- William Peyto (disambiguation)
