= Portal Peak =

Mountain in Banff NP, Alberta, Canada

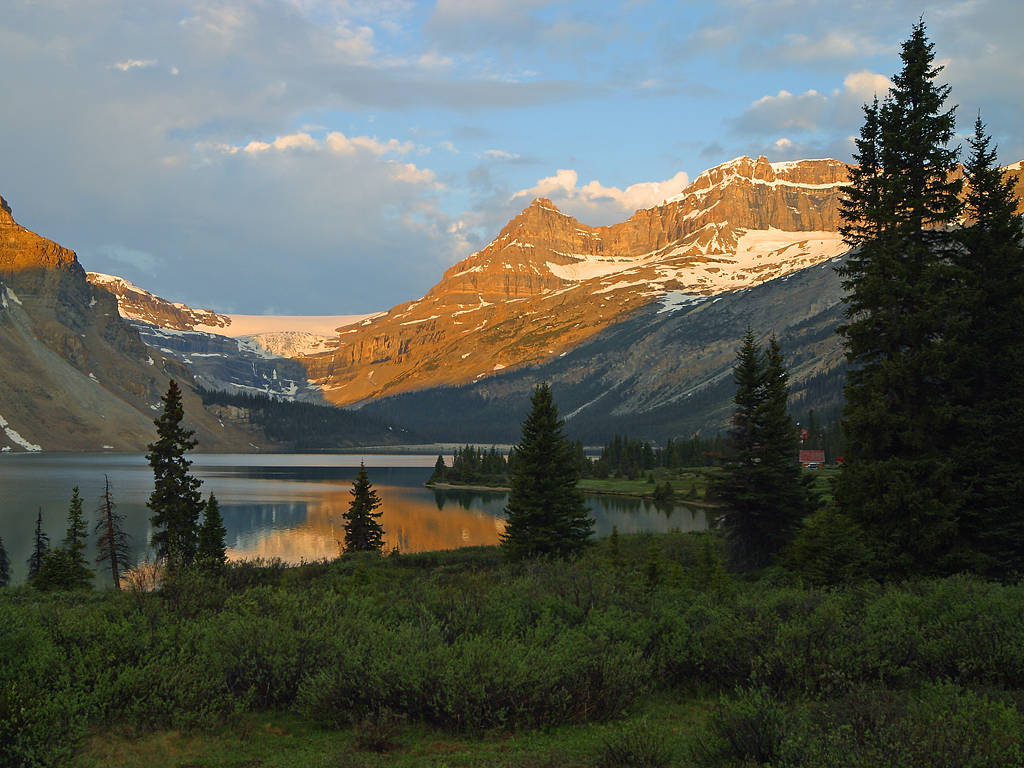
- Portal Peak from Icefields Parkway at Bow Lake

Highest point
- Elevation: 2,926 m (9,600 ft)
- Prominence: 86 m (282 ft)
- Parent peak: Mount Thompson (3089 m)
- Listing: Mountains of Alberta
- Coordinates: 51°39′28″N 116°30′55″W

Geography
- Location within Alberta Location within Canada
- Interactive map of Portal Peak
- Location: Alberta, Canada
- Parent range: Waputik Mountains; Canadian Rockies
- Topo map: NTS 82N10 Blaeberry River

Geology
- Rock age: Cambrian
- Rock type: Sedimentary

Climbing
- First ascent: 1926 by D. Duncan and L. Hudson

Portal Peak is a 2,926-metre (9,600-foot) mountain summit located four kilometers west of Bow Lake in Banff National Park, in the Canadian Rockies of Alberta, Canada. Its nearest higher peak is Mount Thompson, 1.0 km (0.62 mi) to the northwest. Portal Peak is situated east of the Wapta Icefield, and is a member of the Waputik Mountains. Portal Peak can be seen from the Icefields Parkway at Bow Lake.

== History ==
Portal Peak was named in 1916 by Charles Sproull Thompson (1869-1921), who participated in numerous first ascents in the Canadian Rockies. In August 1897, Charles Thompson, Hugh Stutfield, and J. Norman Collie camped on the shores of Bow Lake; then proceeded to climb the Bow Glacier, which at that time descended farther down into the valley; then crossed the Wapta Icefield to attain the summit of Mount Gordon. Portal Peak flanks one side of Bow Glacier, which in 1897 was considered the portal to the Wapta Icefield.

The mountain's name was officially adopted in 1924 by the Geographical Names Board of Canada.

The first ascent of Portal Peak was made in 1926 by D. Duncan and L. Hudson.

== Geology ==
Portal Peak is an overthrust peak situated between the Bow Glacier and Peyto Glacier. Like other mountains in Banff Park, Portal Peak is composed of sedimentary rock laid down during the Precambrian to Jurassic periods. Formed in shallow seas, this sedimentary rock was pushed east and over the top of younger rock during the Laramide orogeny.

== Climate ==
Based on the Köppen climate classification, Portal Peak is located in a subarctic climate zone with cold, snowy winters, and mild summers. Winter temperatures can drop below -20 °C with wind chill factors below -30 °C. Precipitation runoff from Portal Peak drains into the Bow River which is a tributary of the Saskatchewan River.

== Gallery ==
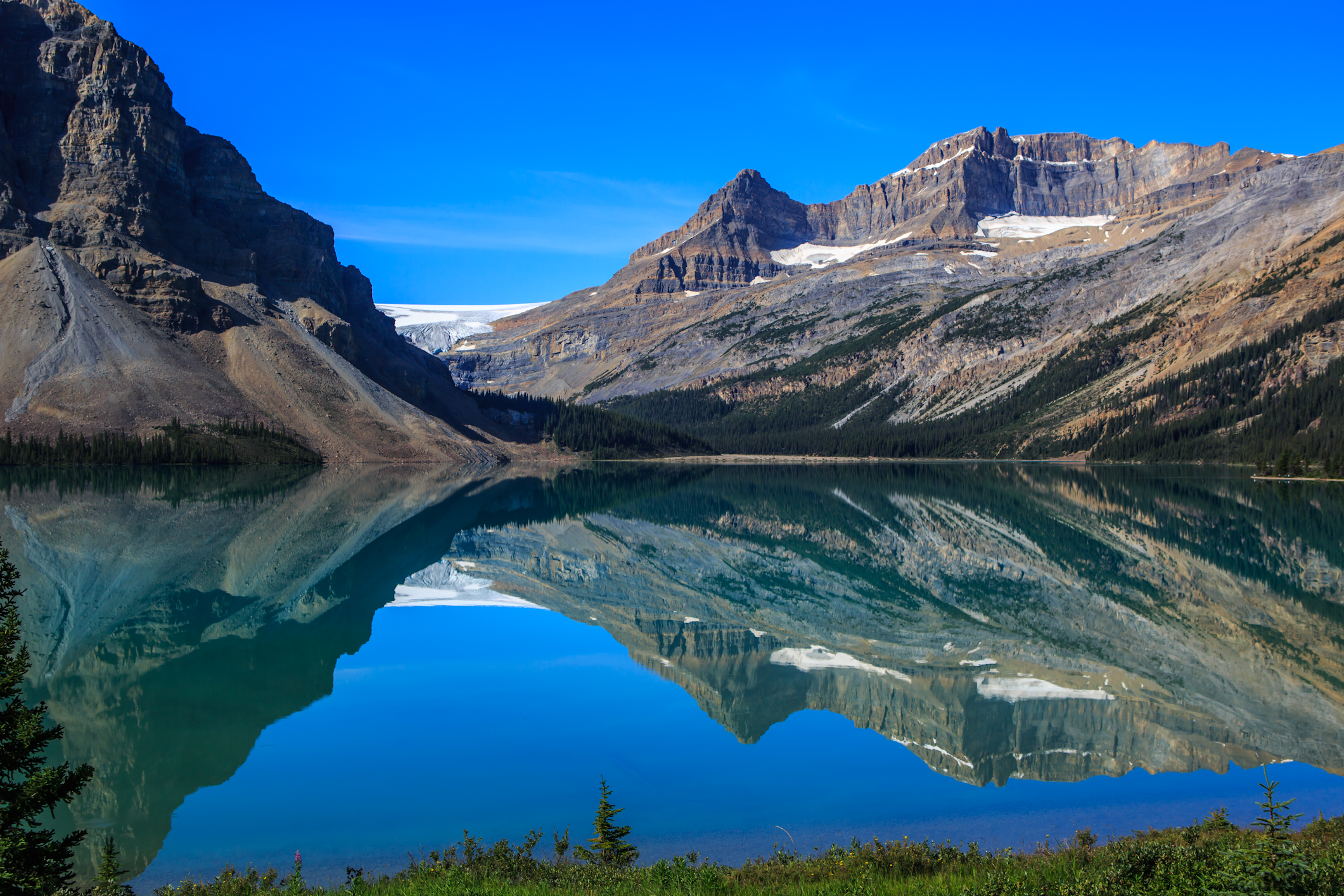
Portal Peak centered with Mount Thompson to right

== See also ==
- List of mountains of Canada
- Geography of Alberta
