= Mount Thompson (Alberta) =

Mountain in Banff National Park, Alberta, Canada

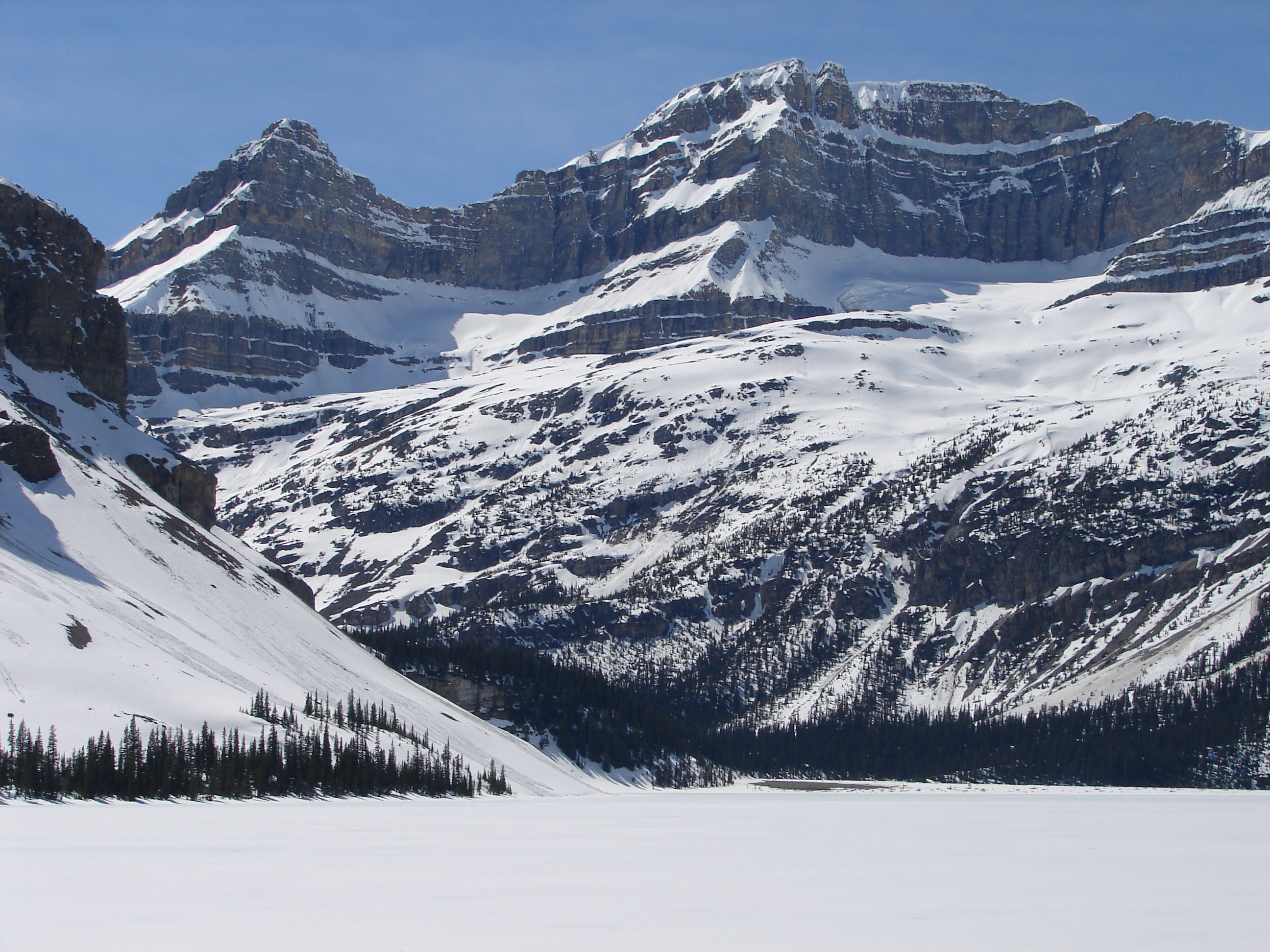
- Mount Thompson seen from Icefields Parkway at Bow Lake. Portal Peak to left.

Highest point
- Elevation: 3,089 m (10,135 ft)
- Prominence: 369 m (1,211 ft)
- Parent peak: Mount Baker (3180 m)
- Listing: Mountains of Alberta
- Coordinates: 51°39′50″N 116°31′22″W

Geography
- Location within Alberta Location within Canada
- Location: Alberta, Canada
- Parent range: Waputik Mountains; Canadian Rockies
- Topo map: NTS 82N10 Blaeberry River

Geology
- Rock age: Cambrian
- Rock type: Sedimentary

Climbing
- First ascent: 1898 by J. Norman Collie, Hugh Stutfield, H. Woolley
- Easiest route: Scrambling Southwest slope

Mount Thompson is a 3,089-metre (10,135-foot) mountain summit located four kilometres west of Bow Lake in Banff National Park, in the Canadian Rockies of Alberta, Canada. Its nearest higher peak is Mount Baker, 5.0 km (3.1 mi) to the west. Mount Thompson is situated east of the Wapta Icefield, and is a member of the Waputik Mountains. Mount Thompson can be seen from the Icefields Parkway at Bow Lake.

== History ==
Mount Thompson is named for Charles Sproull Thompson (1869–1921) who participated in numerous first ascents in the Canadian Rockies. In August 1897, Charles Thompson, Hugh Stutfield, and J. Norman Collie camped on the shores of Bow Lake; then proceeded to climb the Bow Glacier, which at that time descended farther down into the valley; then crossed the Wapta Icefield to attain the summit of Mount Gordon. From Mount Gordon they were surrounded by unnamed mountains and named one of them Mount Thompson. The first ascent of Mount Thompson was made the following year (1898), by Norman Collie, Hugh Stutfield, and Herman Woolley. The mountain's name became official in 1928 by the Geographical Names Board of Canada. Charles Thompson named Portal Peak which is a subsidiary peak located 1.5 km southeast of his peak. Portal Peak flanks one side of Bow Glacier, which in 1897 was considered the portal to the Wapta Icefield.

== Geology ==
Mount Thompson is an overthrust peak situated between the Bow Glacier and Peyto Glacier. Like other mountains in Banff Park, Mount Thompson is composed of sedimentary rock laid down during the Precambrian to Jurassic periods. Formed in shallow seas, this sedimentary rock was pushed east and over the top of younger rock during the Laramide orogeny.

== Climate ==
Based on the Köppen climate classification, Mount Thompson is located in a subarctic climate zone with cold, snowy winters, and mild summers. Temperatures can drop below -20 °C with wind chill factors below -30 °C. Precipitation runoff from Mount Thompson drains into the Bow River which is a tributary of the Saskatchewan River.

== Gallery ==
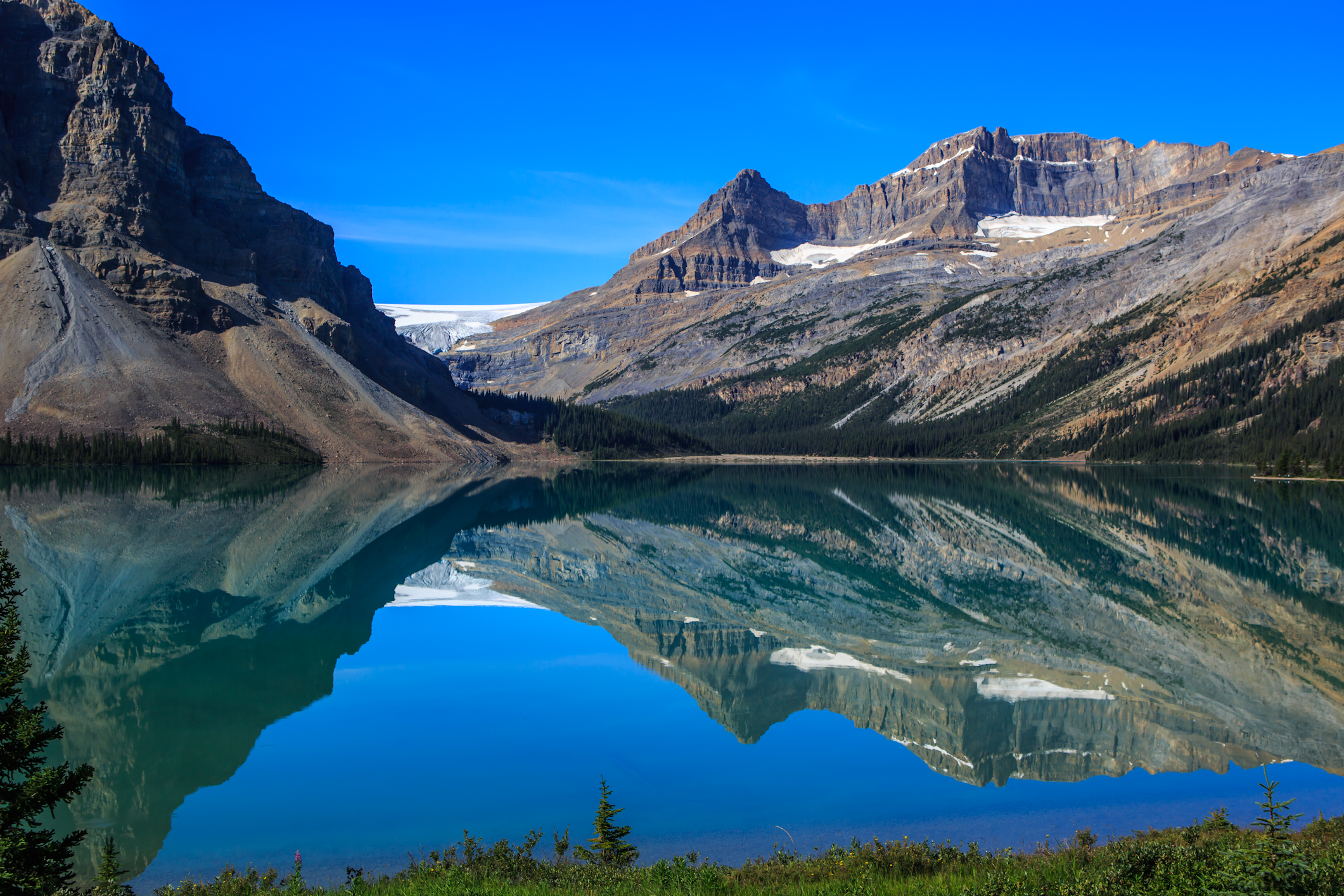
Mount Thompson (upper right) reflected in Bow Lake

== See also ==
- List of mountains of Canada
- Geography of Alberta
