= R. J. Ritchie Hut =

Alpine hut in Banff National Park, Canada

R. J. Ritchie (Balfour) Hut
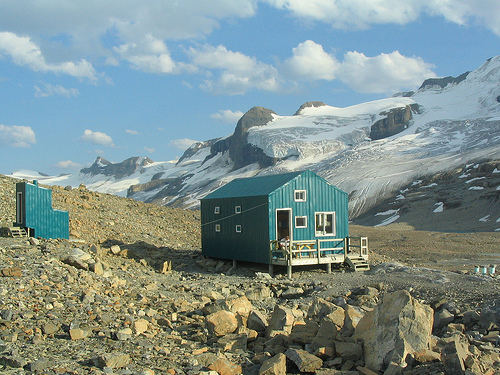
- Balfour Hut with Mount Balfour in the background - Sept 2005
- Interactive map of the R. J. Ritchie (Balfour) Hut area

General information
- Type: alpine hut
- Architectural style: Metal Shelter cabin
- Location: Wapta Icefield, Canada
- Coordinates: 51°35′30″N 116°27′18″W
- Owner: Alpine Club of Canada

Technical details
- Material: Metal

Design and construction
- Architect: Alpine Club of Canada

Website
- Balfour Hut at the Alpine Club of Canada

The R. J. Ritchie Hut (Balfour Hut) is an alpine hut located at an altitude of 2,470 metres (8,100 ft) between the southern tip of the Wapta Icefield and the northern tip of the Waputik Icefield in Banff National Park. The hut is at the half-way mark for the Wapta traverse and is usually used in conjunction with the other huts in this chain while attempting a cross-glacier ski trip. The hut is maintained by the Alpine Club of Canada.

The hut sleeps 18 in the summer and 16 in the winter. It is equipped with propane-powered lamps and stovetop.

The hut requires approximately three to five hours of glacier travel to get to from the Bow Hut, or six to eight hours from the Scott Duncan Hut.

== Location ==
The hut is found on low, rocky hills at the toe of the Vulture Glacier. It is east of Balfour Pass and the continental divide, just inside the boundary of Banff National Park.

== History ==
The original Balfour Hut, a fibreglass igloo built in 1965 at Balfour Pass in Banff National Park, was the first hut on the Wapta Icefield. Construction was undertaken by the Alpine Club of Canada and the Calgary Ski Club. It survived until 1971, having been disassembled and reassembled entirely with Swiss Army Knives, airlifted by helicopter, and inadvertently dropped onto a glacial moraine. Eventually, marauding bands of wolverines destroyed it.

The second Balfour Hut was constructed in 1971 of cedar logs on the south side of Mount Olive to the west of the continental divide in Yoho National Park. It lasted for 18 years.

In 1989, the current metal hut was built at a new location in Banff National Park: the toe of the Vulture Glacier.

== Nearby ==
- Wapta Icefield
- Waputik Icefield
- Bow Hut
- Scott Duncan Hut
