= Bow Hut =

Alphine hut

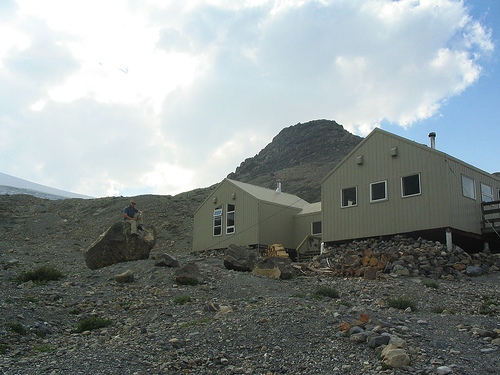
- Bow Hut - Sept 2005
- Interactive map of the Bow Hut area

General information
- Type: alpine hut
- Architectural style: Metal Shelter cabin
- Location: Wapta Icefield, Canada
- Coordinates: 51°38′6″N 116°29′24″W
- Opened: 1989
- Owner: Alpine Club of Canada

Technical details
- Material: Metal

Design and construction
- Architect: Alpine Club of Canada

Website
- www.alpineclubofcanada.ca/facility/bow.html

The Bow Hut is an alpine hut located at an elevation of 2,350 metres (7,710 ft) on the eastern edge of the Wapta Icefield in Banff National Park. It is the largest, best equipped, and most accessible of the four alpine huts on the Wapta Icefield, and serves as the base for a wide variety of ski tours and mountaineering ascents to half a dozen peaks on the Wapta. It is the easiest and safest starting point for the Wapta traverse; and Balfour Hut, the next hut on the traverse, can easily be reached from it in a day. It can also serve as an intermediate stop in a longer traverse which starts at the less easily accessible Peyto Hut. The hut is maintained by the Alpine Club of Canada.

The hut sleeps 30 and is equipped with propane powered lamps and stovetop, and a wood stove for heating. There are two indoor drum toilets.

== History ==
The original Bow Hut was built in 1968 by a group led by Peter Fuhrmann, who later became president of the Alpine Club of Canada from 1984 to 1988, and was funded by Peter and Catharine Whyte. The construction was done mostly by members of the Alpine Club and the Calgary Ski Club. The location of the hut, near Bow Glacier, was chosen to assist ski tourers and mountaineers entering the Wapta Icefield via Bow Lake. The old hut saw severe overuse, with up to 7,000 people a year using a building that only slept 14 people at a time. By the 1980s it was in a state of serious disrepair and surrounded by contamination from the outhouses, causing many people to refer to it as Bow Ghetto. In 1989 a new hut was built under the direction of Mike Mortimer, Chairman of the Huts Committee of the Alpine Club of Canada and later President from 1994 to 2001. Money for the facility was primarily provided by the Calgary and Edmonton Sections of the Alpine Club. The new facility is much larger than the previous one, with much better cooking, and waste disposal facilities; and with sleeping areas separated from the rest of the hut to accommodate a number of different groups at a time.

== Location ==
Bow Hut is located near the headwaters of the Bow River, about 33 kilometres (21 mi) northwest of Lake Louise, Alberta along the Icefields Parkway in Banff National Park. The hut is situated above Bow Lake on the east edge of the Wapta Icefield, at an altitude of 2,350 metres (7,710 ft). It is about 1 kilometre northeast of Saint Nicholas Peak.

== Access ==
Reaching the hut requires approximately 3 to 6 hours of hiking or skiing from the Icefields Parkway. The hut can also be reached by approximately 3 to 5 hours of glacier travel from the Balfour Hut, or 4 to 6 hours of glacier travel from the Peyto Hut.

=== Summer ===
The summer trail to Bow Hut leaves from the main parking lot on the highway at Bow Lake. It goes past Num-Ti-Jah Lodge and follows the north shore of the lake around to the main creek that feeds the lake. The trail ascends to the right of the canyon just upstream from the lake. At a junction it goes to the left, and crosses the creek, passing over a boulder lodged in the top of the canyon. The trail stays on the east side of the creek for a few kilometres until it opens out into moraine terrain near the treeline. A number of trails marked by cairns lead to the massive headwall below the hut, where hikers must cross the creek and can follow any of a number of trails up the steep slope to the hut. The trip requires 3 to 6 hours.

=== Winter ===
The winter route is a little different from the summer trail, and involves exposure to complex avalanche terrain. Skiers can cross the frozen lake, if the ice is thick enough, and at the far side can stay to the left of the creek, following a good trail that skirts the canyon. After about 700 metres (2,300 ft) the route drops down onto the creek bed and follows it through a gorge. After the gorge becomes too difficult to negotiate, skiers must ascend the bank to the left at one of the easier points, and then angle up through the trees, parallel to the canyon. When the route reaches an open basin, it is possible to see the hut high up on the headwall to the right. From that point, skiers should aim for the right-hand corner of the headwall, staying left initially to avoid the worst of the moraine. Toward the end of the valley, a number of possible routes lead up through the headwall to the hut, which is a few hundred metres from the top of the headwall. The trip normally takes 3 to 5 hours.

== Nearby ==
- Wapta Icefield
- Saint Nicholas Peak
- Bow Glacier
- Bow Lake
- Bow River
- R.J. Ritchie Hut, (Balfour Hut)
- Peter and Catharine Whyte Hut, (Peyto Hut)
