= Mike Mortimer =

Canadian alpinist

- Born: 15 October 1950 (age 75); Manchester, England
- Occupation: Business
- Known for: Mountaineering, climbing, UIAA President

Mike Mortimer (born 15 October 1950) is a Canadian alpinist. He was president of the Alpine Club of Canada and the International Climbing and Mountaineering Federation (UIAA).

== Biography ==
Michael Kenneth Mortimer grew up with his older brother Tony in Manchester. When he was six years old he went to the Potterspury Lodge boarding school, a Waldorf School that placed great emphasis on camping, hiking and other outdoor activities. Here he got to know the mountains. Their mother joined a hiking club and took her two boys with her. In the late 1950s, the family moved to Cape Town, South Africa, where Mike went secretly climbing with other young people and in nail-shoes on the 200-meter cliffs of the Table Mountain. He became a member of the Mountain Club of South Africa.

From 1971 to 1974, he travelled around the world and financed himself with odd jobs: he was a dishwasher in the mountaineering hotel Hermitage Hotel, Mount Cook Village, in New Zealand, he camped at the foot of the Eiger in 1973 and climbed surrounding mountains (Schreckhorn, Mönch, Jungfrau, Eiger etc.). In Canada, he met a teacher named Heather Roddick, whom he married in 1974 and who became his rope partner. The Mortimers traveled the world together until 1977 when they settled in Calgary because of the nearby mountains and studied at the university there, where he graduated in Economics in 1982. They became members of the Calgary section of the Alpine Club of Canada (ACC) and began to expand the club's activities there: they organized social events and volunteered to renovate shelters.

In 1980, Mortimer became president of the Calgary Section. A tragic mountain accident led him to professionalize mountaineering. From 1982, he organized conferences on accident prevention, route planning, avalanche protection, etc. In 1982, Mortimer was the founding president of the Calgary Area Outdoor Council (CAOC).

In the same year, he became manager of the Hostel Shop of the Southern Alberta Hostelling Association, which was the starting point for many of his initiatives and activities, such as events with international elite mountaineers. For many years he was Master of Ceremonies at the Banff Mountain Film Festival (BMFF) which he initiated. In 1983, he became general agent of Ortovox (Avalanche transceivers).

In 1984, he joined the hut committee of the Alpine Club of Canada, later became its president and laid the foundation for the modern Canadian hut system financing, renovation, expansion and operation of the ACC huts: Bow Hut, Lawrence Grassi Hut, Lloyd MacKay Hut, Abbot Pass Hut, R.J. Ritchie Hut, Wapta Icefield Huts, etc..

From 1994 to 2001, Mortimer was President of the Alpine Club of Canada. He resumed the historic partnership with the Canadian Mountain Guides Association and the American Alpine Club (AAC). In 1997, he represented the ACC in Japan during the 75th anniversary of the first ascent of Mount Alberta by the Japanese Maki Yūkō and dined with the Crown Prince and the Prime Minister.

As the first ACC Director of External Relations, he represented North America at the UIAA (International Mountaineering and Climbing Federation). From 2005 to 2011 he was UIAA President.

== Honors ==
- In 1986 Mortimer received the Distinguished Service Award of the ACC for outstanding volunteer service
- 2001 he was awarded the Alpine Club of Canada's A.O. Wheeler Legacy Award
- In 2005 he became honorary member of the Alpine Club of Canada
