= Peyto Hut =

Peter and Catharine Whyte Hut
- Interactive map of the Peter and Catharine Whyte Hut area

General information
- Type: alpine hut
- Architectural style: Metal Shelter cabin
- Location: Bow Valley, Canada
- Coordinates: 51°39′48″N 116°32′42″W
- Owner: Alpine Club of Canada

Technical details
- Material: Metal

Design and construction
- Architect: Alpine Club of Canada

Website
- www.alpineclubofcanada.ca/facility/peyto.html

The Peter and Catharine Whyte Hut, also known as the Peyto Hut, is an alpine hut located on the northern tip of the Wapta Icefield in Banff National Park. It is nicknamed the Peyto hut due to its proximity on the Peyto Glacier. The hut is maintained by the Alpine Club of Canada.

The hut sleeps 18 in the summer and 16 in the winter. It is equipped with propane powered lamps and stovetop. There is a single outdoor drum toilet at this facility.

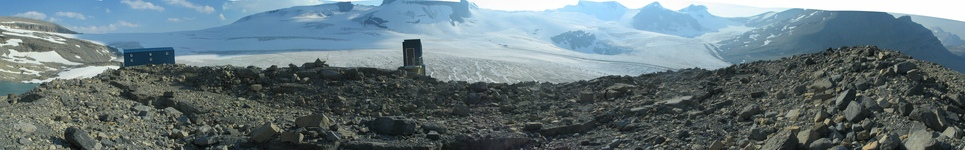
Peter and Catherine Whyte Hut and the Peyto Glacier, 2005

Hut access requires approximately 6 to 8 hours of travel including at least an hour of glacier travel to get to from Peyto Lake, or 6 to 8 hours of glacier travel from the Bow Hut.

== Nearby ==
- Peyto Lake
- Peyto Glacier
- Wapta Icefield
- Bow Hut
- R.J. Ritchie Hut, (Balfour Hut)
