= Alpine Club of Canada =

Canadian amateur mountaineering organization

- Sport: Mountaineering
- Category: Amateur Athletic Association
- Abbreviation: ACC
- Founded: 1906
- Affiliation: International Federation of Sport Climbing and the Union Internationale des Associations d'Alpinisme (U.I.A.A.),
- Regional affiliation: 25

Official website
- alpineclubofcanada.ca
- (Canada)

The Alpine Club of Canada (ACC) is an amateur athletic association with its national office in Canmore, Alberta that has been a focal point for Canadian mountaineering since its founding in 1906. The club was co-founded by Arthur Oliver Wheeler, who served as its first president, and Elizabeth Parker, a journalist for the Manitoba Free Press. Byron Harmon, whose 6500+ photographs of the Canadian Rockies in the early 20th century provide the best glimpse of the area at that time, was official photographer to the club at its founding. The club is the leading organization in Canada devoted to climbing, mountain culture, and issues related to alpine pursuits and ecology.

The ACC is divided into 25 regional sections across Canada that serve local members and focus on local issues and access, linking mountain enthusiasts to the national community. The club also maintains membership in international organizations including the International Federation of Sport Climbing and the Union Internationale des Associations d'Alpinisme (U.I.A.A.), provides year-round mountain adventures and an extensive system of alpine and backcountry huts throughout the Canadian Rockies, the ACC has grown from its early inception into a full-fledged mountain organization with a strong foundation of volunteer, professional and corporate support. The club's goals remain the promotion of mountain culture adventure, access, and environmental responsibility. The ACC publishes the annual Canadian Alpine Journal, which serves as the journal of record for Canadian achievements in climbing, mountaineering, ski mountaineering, and exploration of mountains.

While the ACC's national office is in Canmore, Alberta, the core of the Club's activities are the volunteer-led outdoor recreation opportunities offered to its approximately 10,000 members through the 25 regional sections across the country.

In 2006, Canada Post issued a stamp to celebrate the club's centenary.

== History ==
=== The founders ===
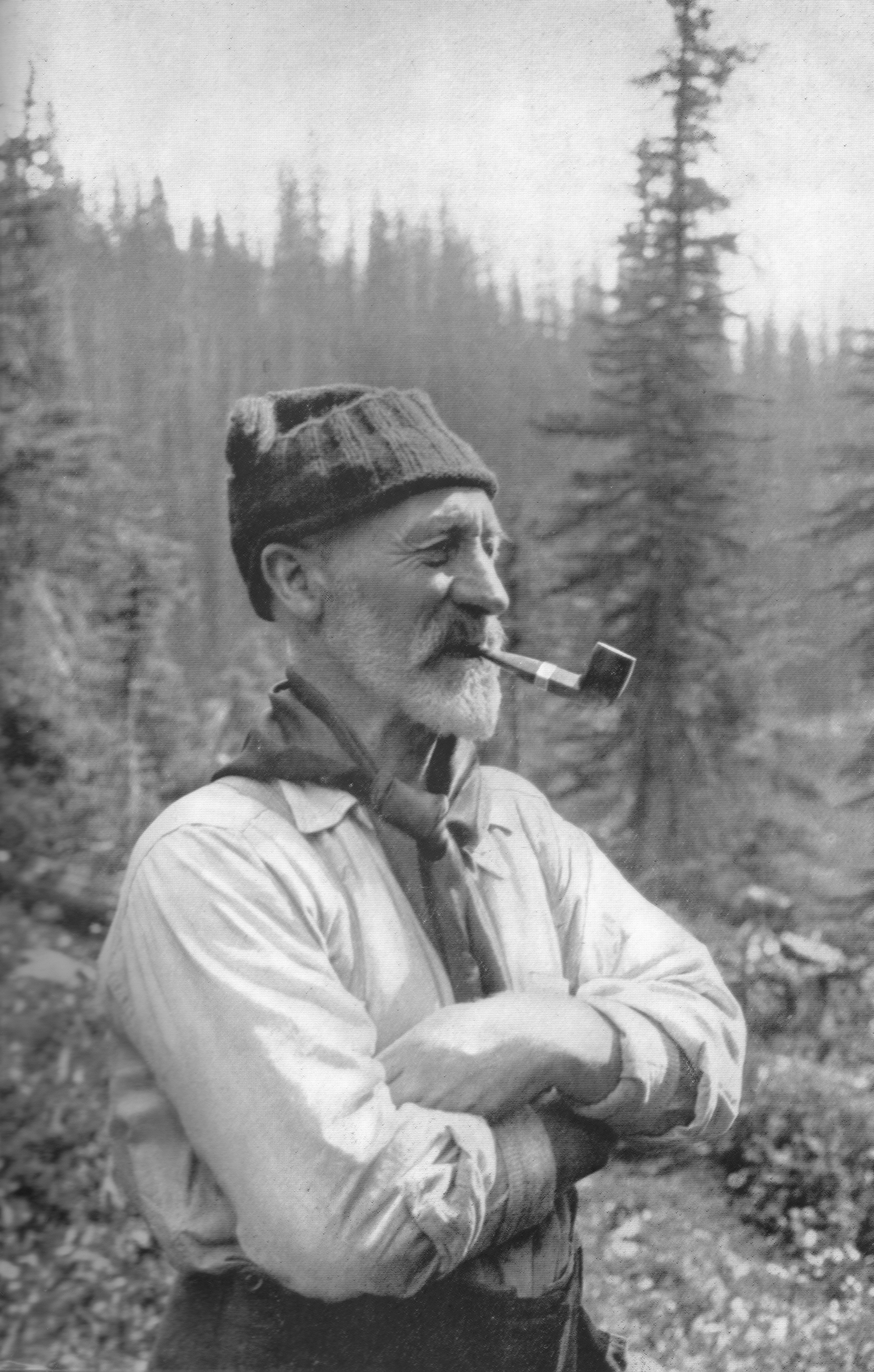
A.O. Wheeler

In the spirit of the Alpine Club created in England in 1857, and the American Alpine Club (founded 1902), the ACC was established in Winnipeg in 1906 by A.O. Wheeler and Elizabeth Parker, with the support of the Canadian Pacific Railway. Arthur O. Wheeler, who was born in 1860 in Kilkenny County, Ireland, immigrated to Canada in 1876 at the age of 16 with his family. Beginning in 1883, he worked for the Dominion Government and Canadian Pacific Railway as a land surveyor in the Canadian Rockies. His employment allowed him to experience mountaineering while exposing him to environmental concerns about the future of Canadian wilderness. He was described by climbing enthusiast Andrew J. Kauffman as having "Irish emotions, Irish sensitivity, Irish grace and, more frequently than some would like, an Irish temper". He was eager to create a Canadian climbing institution that focused on mutual appreciation of mountaineering and the environment rather than furthering social status, as it was in Britain's Alpine Club.

Wheeler's wrote many letters seeking support for the creation of a Canadian Alpine Club, which eventually ended up in the hands of columnist Elizabeth Parker. A native of Winnipeg, Parker was an avid nationalist and an environmental enthusiast. Conscious of the benefit of mountains, she took her children to Banff in the summer of 1904. She spent 18 months there and began writing newspaper and magazine articles about the mountains. Even if her health did not allow her to be a climber she thought that mountaineering could help women become stronger and more confident. After reading her articles, an editor of the Manitoba Free Press referenced her to Wheeler's letters. Writing an article in response to his letter, Parker advocated the establishment of an Alpine Club. However, she believed that it should be solely Canadian to encourage the development of national identity and reaffirm Canadian independence. Together they combined their efforts to create the Alpine Club of Canada.

=== Creation ===
The inaugural meeting took place on March 27 and 28 1906. A.O. Wheeler became President and Elizabeth Parker was named First Secretary. Several categories of members were created with different levels of involvement: Honorary Members (who had already distinguished themselves in the field of mountaineering), Active Members (who have made an ascent of a peak of at least 10,000 feet). The first official camp of the ACC took place in July 1906. Thanks to the Canadian Pacific Railway, campers arrived at Field, B.C in Yoho National Park on July 8. The camp's chief mountaineer was Morrison Bridgland. The ACC received helped from professional mountain guides Edouard and Gottfried Feuz, from Switzerland. The Dominion Government, as recognition of its "spirit of patriotism", sponsored the camp, as well as the government of Alberta, the Canadian Pacific Railway and the North-West Mounted Police. Every member paid a dollar a day: with its 100 participants, the camp was considered a success. Morrison Bridgland chose the official climb, the 3066 meter-high Vice President: 44 members graduated and became Active Member of the Alpine Club of Canada.

=== Purpose ===
Molded after the Alpine Club in Great Britain, the Alpine Club of Canada was created to give environmental enthusiasts an opportunity to explore and experience the Canadian wilderness. Unlike the Alpine Club of Great Britain, the Alpine Club of Canada was created to promote equality between men and women within mountaineering and climbing, and to promote the conservation and preservation of Canadian wilderness. At the turn of the 20th century development in Canada expanded into mountain ecosystems, so founders Elizabeth Parker and A.O. Wheeler created the ACC to advocate the prevention of human infiltrations such as electricity and housing in the Canadian wilderness. The ACC helped progress societies mindset towards nature, mountaineering and the environment. Established in the first club meeting in 1906, the committee created a charter with key points that would help progress the club and their vision.

This charter included:

1. To encourage Canadians to value the rich mountain environments.
2. The use of mountain wilderness as a recreational playground.
3. The conservation of mountain ecosystems, and the organisms that live in them
4. The exchange of wilderness literature with other environmentally focused organizations.
5. Encourage the development of scientific exploration and study of Canadian alpine glaciers.
6. Cultivation of artwork associated with the outdoors

These principles reflected the member's goal to create a club that promoted the natural heritage of Canada while encouraging the urban classes of society to exercise in the outdoors. In 1923, the club was involved in activism concerning the construction of hydroelectric dams in places such as Waterton Lake, the Spray Lakes, and Lake Minnewanka. This put the ACC at the forefront of conservation groups, which helped it to create the National Parks of Canada in 1923. Beginning in 1906 and continuing until 1950, the Alpine Club of Canada progressed their relationship with the National Parks of Canada to promote outdoor activities, mountaineering and conservation. After the two World Wars, the ACC's philosophy progressed from being centered around strict conservation of the environment to encouraging outdoor recreation while maintaining a respectful appreciation of Canada's wilderness. The ACC and the NPC worked together to expand the parks system for easier access to the public. During these formative years, the ACC surveyed much for the Canadian Rockies which had been previously unmapped. The club also acted as management for the new National Parks board and aided with administration. The ACC aided in restoration of natural areas that were to be integrated into the parks while establishing the Park's conservation policies. As the National Parks in both the United States and Canada gained popularity, outdoor recreation became a prominent activity for many Canadians, which helped shape the ACC's goal and mission.

The mission of the ACC has evolved since 1906, but since the creation of the original charters, the club has promoted the sport of climbing and the recreational use and protection of mountain wilderness. The ACC viewed the National parks of Canada as assets that should be used by the public for recreation, but also held in trust to be preserved for future generations.

== Organization ==
Alpine Club Of Canada (106704182rr0001) was registered with Canadian Revenue Agency as a Canadian amateur athletic association (RCAAA); therefore, they can issue official donation receipts and are eligible to receive gifts from registered charities since 1972-05-29.

=== Climbing competition ===
Since the advent of sport climbing competitions on artificial surfaces in the mid-1980s, the Alpine Club of Canada had sanctioned (first through the UIAA, and since 2007 through the IFSC) national competitions and an international team. The first Canadian national championships were held in 1988 onstage in a theatre at the Banff Centre. In 2014, Climbing Escalade Canada (CEC) took over responsibility for the regulation and development of the sport in Canada and by Canadians abroad. The CEC is recognized by Sport Canada as the national sports organization for competitive climbing, by bringing together provincial and territorial sports organizations (currently established in Yukon and in each Canadian province other than Prince Edward Island and Saskatchewan). Canadians have been relatively successful internationally in the disciplines of Lead and Bouldering, with a legacy of athletes including the Weldon sisters and most recently Sean McColl and Alannah Yip.

The Alpine Club of Canada also regulates the competitive sports of ice-climbing (through the UIAA) and ski-mountaineering (through the International Ski Mountaineering Federation).

=== Club activities ===
The main activities offered by the Club are its camps and its system of Mountain huts. The Club uses its 25 regional club sections to currently operate 37 huts representing the most extensive system of backcountry accommodation on the continent. The Club's first annual General Mountaineering Camp was held in July 1906 in Yoho National Park, with the idea of educating Canadians about mountain travel and instilling a sense of national pride in their mountain heritage. The camps began as a very modest way to introduce middle-class Canadians to the life of mountaineering. With donations from both the Federal and the Alberta Provincial government, over 100 members marched their way to the Yoho Pass where a temporary Tent village had been erected with the help of the CPR and volunteers. With the expedition a resounding success, the Club has made summer camps for members an annual feature. The summer camps have grown incredibly popular over the years. Acknowledged as an annual celebration by many, some camps have special historical significance such as the 1920 camp which was considered a coming home camp for members returning from World War I. Although the camps originated with only a few tents and cooking utensils, the camps now sometimes boast transport helicopters, propane cooking and hot showers as some of the amenities available to the hundreds of members who make the camps a memorable part of their membership. The style of the camps may have changed over the years; however, the goal remains the same: to improve mountaineering skills and push the limits of the members through tougher and tougher climbs.

While the ACC's national office is in Canmore, Alberta, the core of the Club's activities are the volunteer-led climbing opportunities offered to its membership through 25 regional sections across the country. The ACC has a calendar of winter and summer programs including leadership training, technical climbing instruction and international expeditions (for example, in 1997 the Saskatchewan section of the Club held a successful trip to Cho Oyu, an 8,201m peak in Nepal and more recently the Club offered a trip to the snowy peaks of Chile in January 2012). The different activities offered through the club are as diverse as mountaineering itself; one can learn to do Winter or Summer climbs, improve their backcountry skiing skills or refresh their ice climbing technique. Also accreditation for various certificates is available through the Club. The programmed adventures are also geared towards all skill levels and for all age groups. The only main criteria for the activities is that membership to the Club is required. The dedicated group of volunteers who organize these excursions are members themselves. Finally, the Club is also the focal point for Canadian mountain culture through its website, publications and programs. For instance, it is a big supporter of the annual Banff Mountain Film & Book Festival.

=== Club legacy ===
From its origins in Winnipeg more than a century ago to the current, the Alpine Club of Canada has altered slightly. As the Club's founders expected it, the ACC has played a crucial role in shaping both the Canadian territory and the Canadian identity. As A.O.Wheeler wrote it in 1953, "The Club is a permanency and in its 47 years of existence has done more than any other single institution to open up our mountains and bring revenue to the Parks and to Canada, both as a Club as such and from the explorations of its individual members, Canadian, British and American". Indeed, the Club played a key role in the progression of the Canadian national park system, especially because of its longevity and its strongly rooted values, which enabled its members to always strike a balance between preservation and use. The author, Pearl Ann Reichwein, highlights the same idea, fifty years later: "Since creating its charter almost 90 year ago the ACC maintained extraordinary continuity as witnessed by the Canadian Alpine Journal, published annually. Conceived with a wide-ranging agenda beyond the scope of a simple mountaineering club, the ACC has remained an agile and long-lived national organization".

=== The Canadian Alpine Journal ===
The ACC publishes the annual Canadian Alpine Journal, "the oldest and most respected publication of its kind in the country". The Canadian Alpine Journal was established only a year after the ACC had its first general meeting and has been published over 90 times in the last century. According to the ACC website, the journal provides the reader with "articles and images that reflect the ways that Canadians approach mountain culture, history, sport and science". The Journal was and still is published every year, collecting route descriptions, records of adventures, mountain photography, geographical and natural science observations, poems, songs, cartoons and obituaries remembering Club members. Whilst the Journal is an annual publication, the Club also publishes The Gazette, a newsletter released three times a year, one for the spring, summer and winter season. The year 2006 saw the publication of the Centennial Gazette, a special issue celebrating the one hundredth anniversary of the ACC. In the ceremony's opening speech, Mike Mortimer, the Club president in 2006 declared: "Clearly the Centennial was an opportunity to look towards the future – we knew where we came from but what about where we are going? Obviously we would not have the hubris to plan the next century, but maybe we would be in a position to examine the guidelines set by our founding members and see if the cornerstones, that had been laid in Winnipeg and which had served us so well in the previous century, could do the same in the next century". The club has expanded its activities over the last century – it is now responsible for the largest public backcountry hut system in North America and proposes trip opportunities around the world.

== Vision and mission ==
=== A place for women ===
The ACC was one of the first national mountaineering clubs to welcome women. Most Alpine Clubs were fashioned after the Alpine Club in England that did not welcome women and had separate organizations reserved for ladies. Because Elizabeth Parker was one of the two founders of the Alpine Club of Canada, women were never excluded from the ACC. At the end of the first camp in 1906, 15 women (out of 44 members) graduated and became active members of the ACC. Women's participation alongside men became evident in the Club activities and summer camps and those events were frequently used to promote women as legitimate members. On a regular basis, women were perceived in the ACC as able as men. They were encouraged and helped, and after the ACC's first camp it was decided that the dress-code for women would be the same as for men (which was very unusual in the early 20th century society). However, this official equality was sometimes challenged. Indeed, Arthur Wheeler's efforts to publicly acknowledge women's contribution to the ACC led to the distinction of women as a special group. Praising women for their ability to perform basic mountaineering skills, accomplishments for which men's ability was not even questioned, contributed to a sort of patronizing attitude towards women members. For instance, before 1923, no women were to be found among the ACC members volunteer guides. Nevertheless, the ACC played an important part in women's mountaineering, and some women, both American and Canadian, became important and famous mountaineers, such as Phyllis Munday.

=== International ===
The continuing mission of the Alpine Club of Canada is to "foster alpine experiences, knowledge and culture; promoting responsible access; and supporting excellence in alpine leadership and skills". Membership in the national organization is approximately 10,000, and the Club also represents Canada as a member of the Union Internationale des Associations d'Alpinisme (UIAA) – an international "organization of climbing organizations". In this way the ACC works towards its vision of "Preserving, practicing and promoting Canadian mountain culture and self-propelled alpine pursuits."

== Huts ==
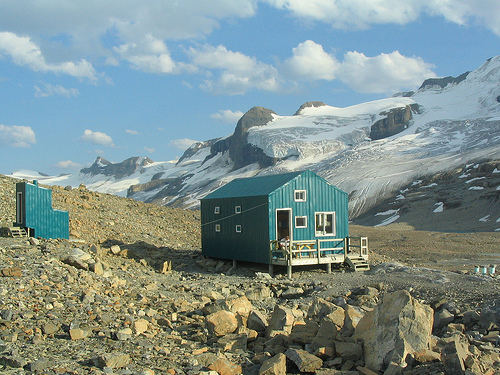
The Balfour Hut with Mount Balfour in the background, Sept. 2005

The Alpine Club of Canada operates an extensive system of alpine club huts available to both members and non-members, primarily in the Canadian Rockies, providing rustic accommodation. For example:

- Abbot Pass Hut, built in 1922 (dismantled in 2022) sat at 2,925m on the Alberta-British Columbia border (51.36406,-116.290204) between Mount Victoria and Mount Lefroy.
- A.O. Wheeler (51.263512,-117.489953) and Asulkan (51.211601,-117.463174) huts are in Glacier National Park, British Columbia and are popular year-round destinations for hikers and skiers.
- Balfour (51.591562,-116.454921) and Bow (51.634825,-116.489611) are two of four ACC huts on the Wapta Icefield near the Continental Divide, from there water flows to the Pacific, Arctic and Atlantic oceans.
- Fairy Meadow Hut (51.763257,-117.876534) in the Selkirk Mountains provides access to such popular backcountry skiing that a lottery system must be used to make a reservation there.
- Conrad Kain hut (50.738338,-116.763324), among the granite spires of Bugaboo Provincial Park, is named after an Austrian mountain guide who was the first to climb many Canadian mountains including Robson (3,954m), the highest point in the Rockies.
- Neil Colgan Hut built between Mount Little and Mount Bowlin is the highest permanent structure in Canada, sitting at 2,957m.

Most of these huts require advance reservation. Members may reserve huts earlier than the general public.

=== Canmore Clubhouse and Boswell Cabin ===
The Alpine Club of Canada Clubhouse located in Canmore is also accommodation. The Clubhouse facilities, affiliated with Hosteling International, are located 4.5 kilometers northeast from downtown Canmore. Positioned on the sunny north side of the bench, it has views of the Bow Valley. Visitors undertake hiking, biking trails, climbing routes and a number of other outdoor activities. Members and Non-member are able to stay at the accommodation.

The main building (The Clubhouse) is furnished with a kitchen, large living room, meeting room, TV/Game room, laundry, WiFi, two decks and a BBQ. The Bell Cabin is a smaller version of the Clubhouse. The Boswell has private rooms.

=== Backcountry Huts ===
Hut name	Location	Region / park
Elizabeth Parker Hut	Lake O'Hara	Yoho National Park
Abbot Pass Hut	Mt. Victoria	Yoho National Park and Banff National Park
Stanley Mitchell Hut	Little Yoho Valley	Yoho National Park
Bill Putnam Hut (Fairy Meadow Hut)	Adamant Range	Selkirk Mountains
A.O. Wheeler Hut	Rogers Pass	Glacier National Park
Asulkan Cabin	Rogers Pass	Glacier National Park
British Columbia
Fay Hut	Prospector's Valley	Kootenay National Park
Elk Lakes Cabin	Elk Lakes Prov. Park	British Columbia
Kokanee Glacier Cabin	Kokanee Glacier Prov. Park	British Columbia
Silver Spray Cabin	Kokanee Glacier Prov. Park	British Columbia
Woodbury Cabin	Kokanee Glacier Prov. Park	British Columbia
Bow Hut	Wapta Icefield	Banff National Park
Peter and Catharine Whyte Hut (Peyto Hut)	Wapta Icefield	Banff National Park
R.J. Ritchie Hut (Balfour Hut)	Wapta Icefield	Banff National Park
Scott Duncan Hut	Wapta Icefield	Yoho National Park
Wates-Gibson Hut	Tonquin Valley	Jasper National Park
Sydney Vallance Hut (Fryatt Hut)	Fryatt Valley	Jasper National Park
Mount Colin Centennial Hut	Colin Range	Jasper National Park
Lloyd MacKay Hut (Mt. Alberta Hut)	Mt. Alberta	Jasper National Park
Neil Colgan Hut	Valley of the Ten Peaks	Banff National Park
Castle Mountain Hut	Castle Mountain	Banff National Park
Ben Ferris Hut (Great Cairn Hut)	Mt. Sir Sandford	Selkirk Mountains

=== Canadian Alpine Centre ===
- Canadian Alpine Centre, Lake Louise, Banff National Park

=== Section Huts ===
- Wendy Thompson Hut, Marriott Basin, British Columbia
- Tantalus Hut, Lake Lovely Water, British Columbia
- Jim Haberl Hut, Tantalus Range, British Columbia
- Keene Farm, Adirondack Forest Preserve, New York State
- Wally Joyce Hut on Mazinaw Lake, Bon Echo Prov. Park, Ontario
