= Neil M. Colgan =

Neil M. Colgan (December 12, 1953 — July 25, 1979) was a Canadian adventurer, hiker, motorcyclist, biological researcher, naturalist, and national park warden. He was a member of climbing expeditions in the Canadian Rockies, the Andes and Alaska.

On a solo back country horse patrol as a Canadian national park warden in Banff National Park, Colgan was kicked by his horse, rupturing his spleen. He died of internal bleeding. He was buried in Mountain View Cemetery in Banff, Alberta.

Tales of his Warden career and death are included in the book Switchbacks by Sid Marty in the chapters entitled "The Dude, the Warden and the Marvel Lake Kid" and "Whence is Courage?".

The Neil Colgan Hut, the highest permanent structure in Canada, was built in his memory with funding from his family and the Alpine Club of Canada

He is also commemorated in the Canadian Police and Peace Officers' Memorial on Parliament Hill in Ottawa.
