= Mount Olive (Canadian Rockies) =

Mountain in Canada

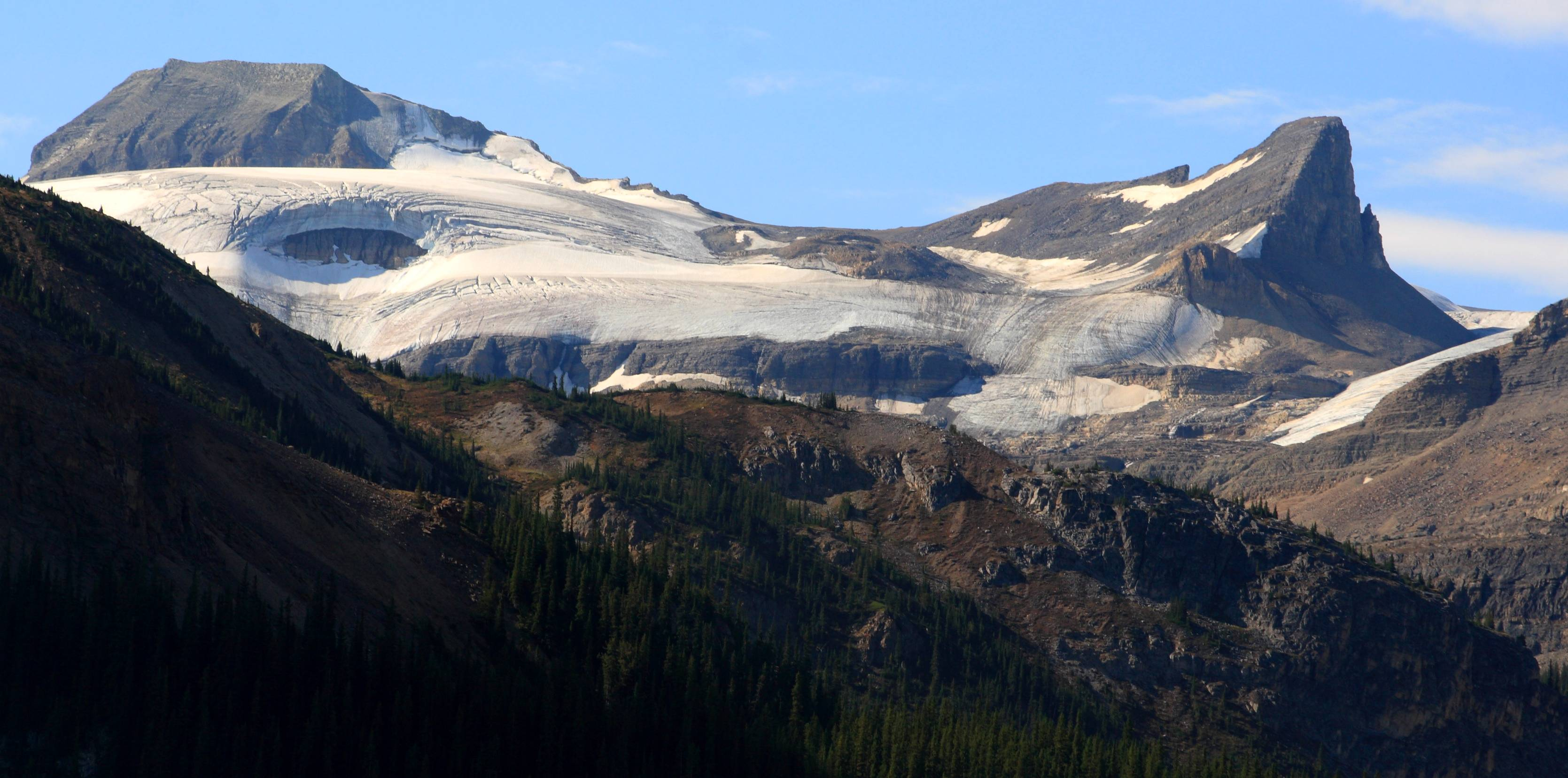
- Mount Olive (left) with Saint Nicholas Peak (right) seen from Bow Lake

Highest point
- Elevation: 3,126 m (10,256 ft)
- Prominence: 146 m (479 ft)
- Listing: Mountains of Alberta; Mountains of British Columbia
- Coordinates: 51°36′40″N 116°29′30″W

Geography
- Location within Alberta Location within British Columbia Location within Canada
- Country: Canada
- Provinces: Alberta and British Columbia
- Protected areas: Banff National Park; Yoho National Park
- Parent range: Park Ranges; Canadian Rockies
- Topo map: NTS 82N9 Hector Lake

Climbing
- First ascent: 1927 M. Cropley, F.A. Gambs, N.L. Goodrich, L. Grassi

Mount Olive is located N of the head of the Yoho River on the Continental Divide, on the Alberta-British Columbia border, in both Banff National Park and Yoho National Park. It lies on the eastern edge of the Wapta Icefield, and is part of the Waputik Mountains. It was named in 1898 by H.B. Dixon after his wife, Olive.

== Geology ==
The peak is composed of sedimentary rock laid down during the Precambrian to Jurassic periods. Formed in shallow seas, this sedimentary rock was pushed east and over the top of younger rock during the Laramide orogeny.

== Climate ==
Based on the Köppen climate classification, it is located in a subarctic climate with cold, snowy winters, and mild summers. Temperatures can drop below -20 °C with wind chill factors below -30 °C.

== See also ==
- List of peaks on the Alberta–British Columbia border
