= Mount Gordon (Waputik Range) =

Mountain in Yoho NP, BC, Canada

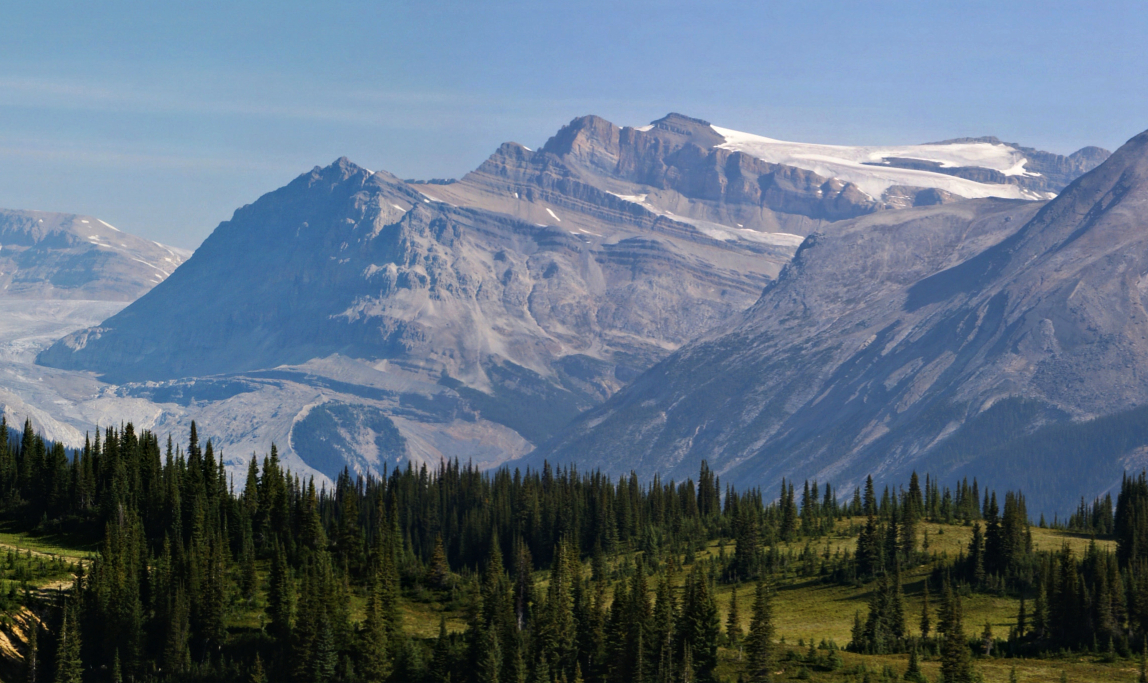
- Mount Gordon seen from Iceline Trail

Highest point
- Elevation: 3,161 m (10,371 ft)
- Prominence: 471 m (1,545 ft)
- Listing: Mountains of British Columbia
- Coordinates: 51°36′22″N 116°30′48″W

Geography
- Location within British Columbia Location within Canada
- Interactive map of Mount Gordon
- Location: Yoho National Park; British Columbia, Canada
- District: Kootenay Land District
- Parent range: Waputik Range; Canadian Rockies
- Topo map: NTS 82N10 Blaeberry River

Geology
- Rock age: Cambrian
- Rock type: Sedimentary

Climbing
- First ascent: 1897 G. Baker, J.N. Collie, H.B. Dixon, C.E. Fay, A. Michael, C.L. Noyes, H.C. Parker, C.S. Thompson, P.Sarbach

Mount Gordon is a 3,161-metre (10,371-foot) mountain summit located immediately west of the Continental Divide, in the Waputik Range of the Canadian Rockies in British Columbia, Canada. It is a glaciated dome situated in Yoho National Park, and is the highest point of the Wapta Icefield. Its nearest higher peak is Mount Baker, 8.8 km (5.5 mi) to the northwest.

== History ==
The first ascent of the mountain was made in August 1897 by George Percival Baker, J. Norman Collie, H. B. Dixon, Charles Ernest Fay, Arthur Michael, C. L. Noyes, H. C. Parker, and Charles Sproull Thompson, with Peter Sarbach as guide.

The mountain was named in 1897 by Charles Sproull Thompson of the first ascent party for John Hamilton-Gordon, 1st Marquess of Aberdeen and Temair, at the time Governor General of Canada from 1893 to 1898. After descending from the summit of Mount Gordon, Thompson fell into a crevasse and became lodged which required rescue by the team. Mount Thompson, six kilometres to the north of Mount Gordon, was one of several peaks named by this same climbing party.

The mountain's toponym was officially adopted in 1924 by the Geographical Names Board of Canada.

== Geology ==
Mount Gordon is composed of sedimentary rock laid down during the Precambrian to Jurassic periods. Formed in shallow seas, this sedimentary rock was pushed east and over the top of younger rock during the Laramide orogeny.

== Climate ==
Based on the Köppen climate classification, Mount Gordon is located in a subarctic climate zone with cold, snowy winters, and mild summers. Winter temperatures can drop below −20 °C with wind chill factors below −30 °C.

== See also ==
- Geology of British Columbia
- Geography of British Columbia
