= National Police Memorial =

National Police Memorial may refer to:

- National Police Memorial (Australia)
- National Police Memorial (India)
- National Police Memorial (United Kingdom)

== See also ==
- Canadian Police and Peace Officers' Memorial, a memorial honoring Canadian law enforcement officers who died as a result of their duties
- National Law Enforcement Officers Memorial, a memorial honoring U.S. law enforcement officers who died in the line of duty
