= Neil Colgan Hut =

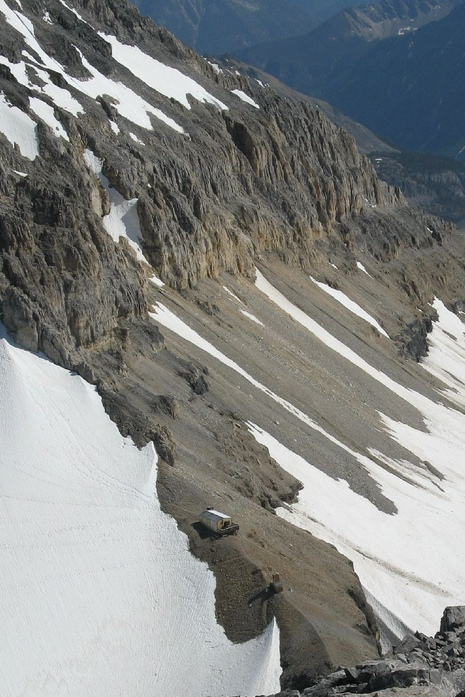
- Neil Colgan Hut taken from Mount Bowlen - July 2007

- Location within British Columbia

General information
- Type: alpine hut
- Architectural style: Metal Shelter cabin
- Location: Prospectors Valley, Canada
- Coordinates: 51°17′52″N 116°11′16″W
- Owner: Alpine Club of Canada

Technical details
- Material: Metal

Design and construction
- Architect: Alpine Club of Canada

Website
- www.alpineclubofcanada.ca/web/ACCMember/Huts/Neil_Colgan_Hut.aspx

The Neil Colgan Hut is an alpine hut located at an altitude of 2,957 metres (9,701 ft) on the Fay Glacier in Kootenay National Park in British Columbia, Canada. It is in a col between Mount Little and Mount Bowlen, one of the peaks overlooking the Valley of the Ten Peaks. The hut is maintained by the Alpine Club of Canada and is the highest permanent structure in Canada. It is named for hiker and adventurer Neil M. Colgan (1953–1979).

The hut can accommodate 18 in the summer and 16 in the winter and is equipped with propane-powered lamps and a stovetop. There is one outdoor drum toilet at the facility.

Reaching the hut from Fay Hut requires approximately 4 to 6 hours of glacier travel, or 8 to 12 hours climbing the Perren Route from Moraine Lake.

== Nearby ==
- Fay Hut
- Valley of the Ten Peaks
