= Saint Nicholas Peak (Canada) =

Mountain in Canada

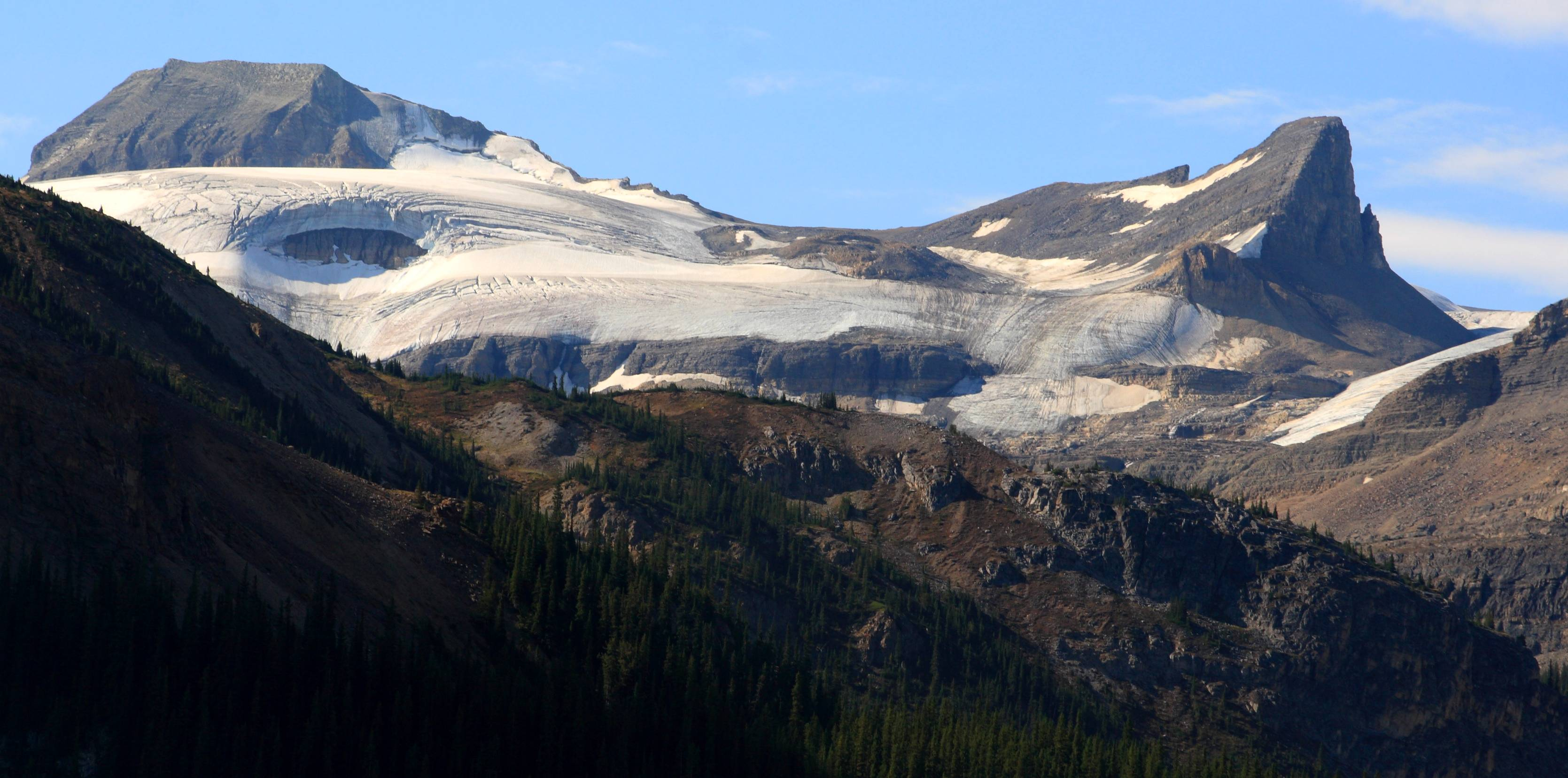
- Mount Olive (left) with Saint Nicholas Peak (right) seen from Bow Lake

Highest point
- Elevation: 2,938 m (9,639 ft)
- Prominence: 38 m (125 ft)
- Parent peak: Mount Olive (3,126 m)
- Listing: Mountains of Alberta; Mountains of British Columbia
- Coordinates: 51°37′40″N 116°30′09″W

Geography
- Location within Alberta Location within British Columbia Location within Canada
- Interactive map of Saint Nicholas Peak
- Country: Canada
- Provinces: Alberta and British Columbia
- National Parks: Banff and Yoho
- Parent range: Waputik Mountains; Canadian Rockies
- Topo map: NTS 82N10 Blaeberry River

Climbing
- First ascent: 1930 by J. Monroe Thorington, Peter Kaufmann

Saint Nicholas Peak is a 2,938-metre (9,639-foot) mountain summit in the Rocky Mountains of Canada. It is located on the Continental Divide, on the Alberta-British Columbia border, in both Banff National Park and Yoho National Park. It lies at the eastern edge of the Wapta Icefield, and is part of the Waputik Mountains which are a sub-range of the Canadian Rockies.

== Name ==
It was named in 1916 by Arthur O. Wheeler; a particular gendarme on the mountain is said to resemble Santa Claus.

== Geology ==
The peak is composed of sedimentary rock laid down during the Precambrian to Jurassic periods. Formed in shallow seas, this sedimentary rock was pushed east and over the top of younger rock during the Laramide orogeny.

== Climate ==
Based on the Köppen climate classification, it is located in a subarctic climate zone with cold, snowy winters, and mild summers. Temperatures can drop below -20 C with wind chill factors below -30 C.

== Gallery ==
Views of Saint Nicholas Peak

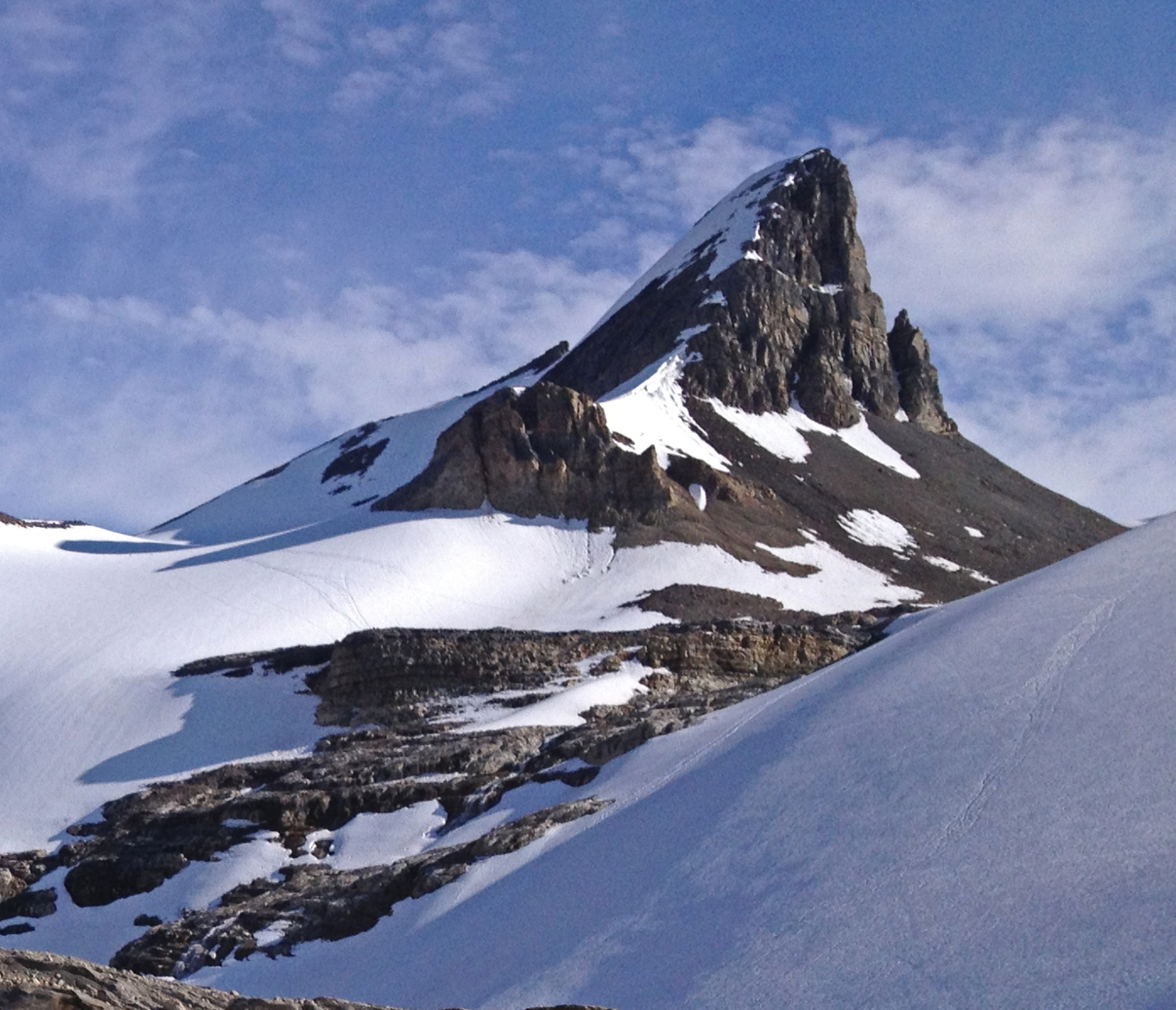
Saint Nicholas Peak

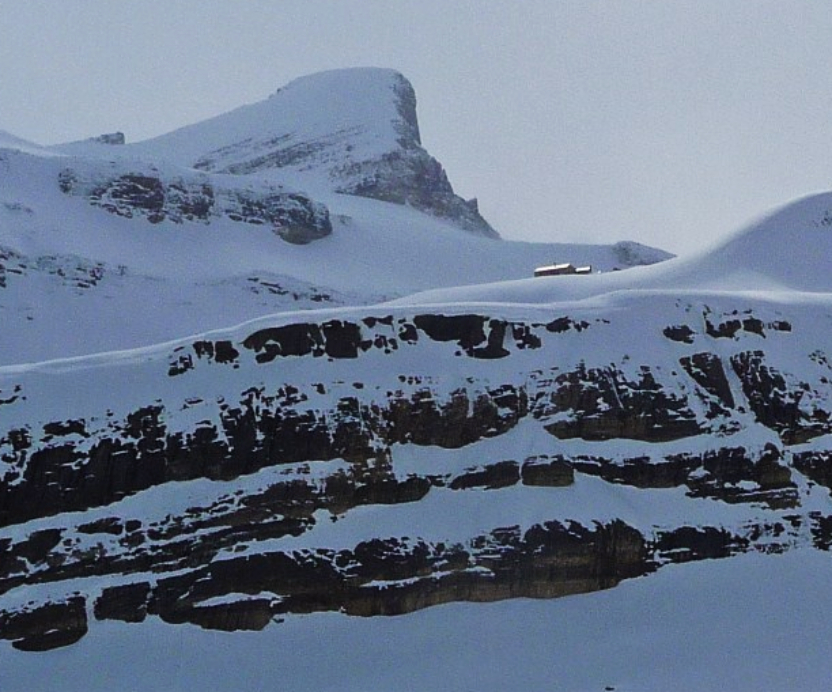
Saint Nicholas Peak and Bow Hut

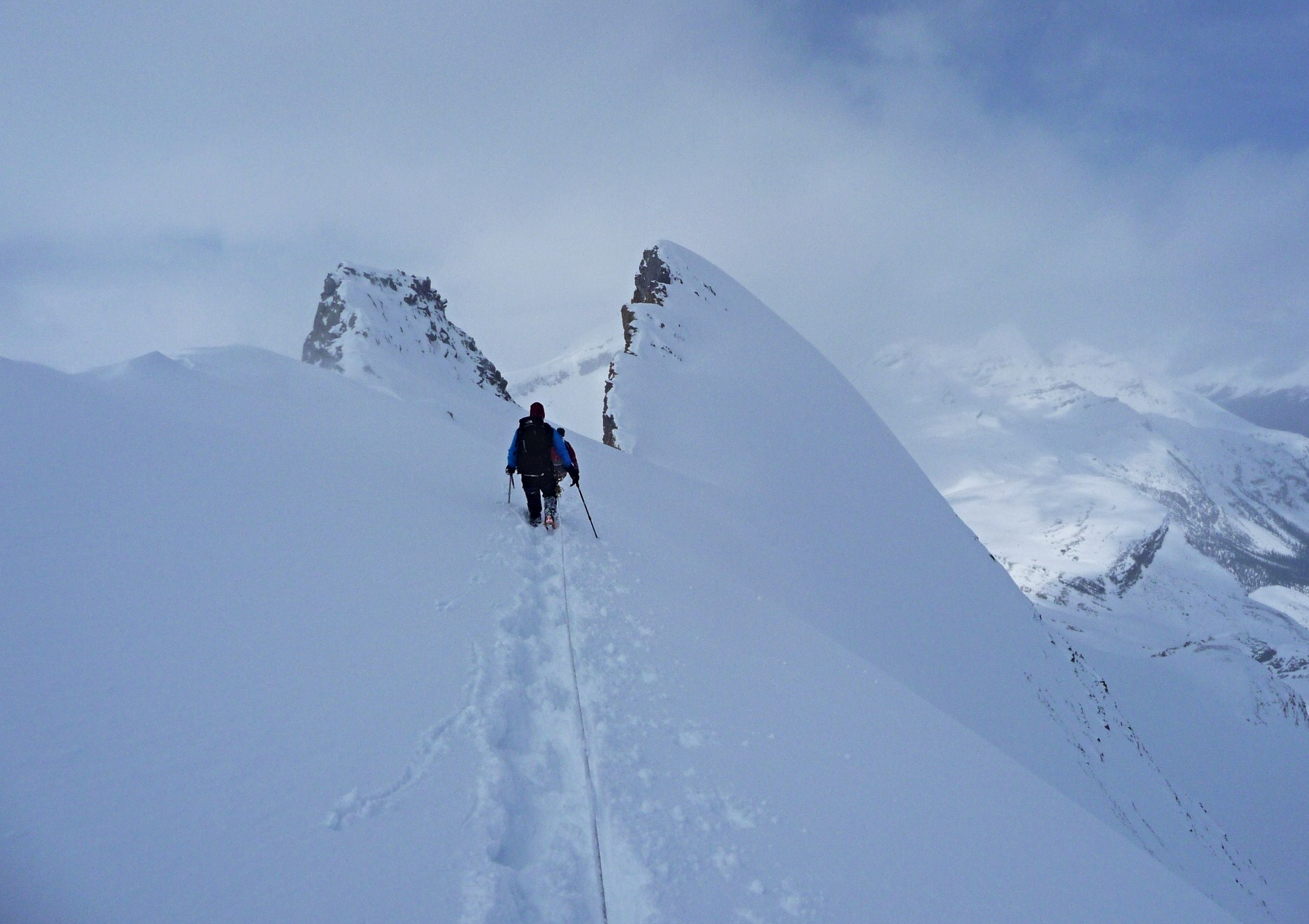
Approaching summit of Saint Nicholas Peak

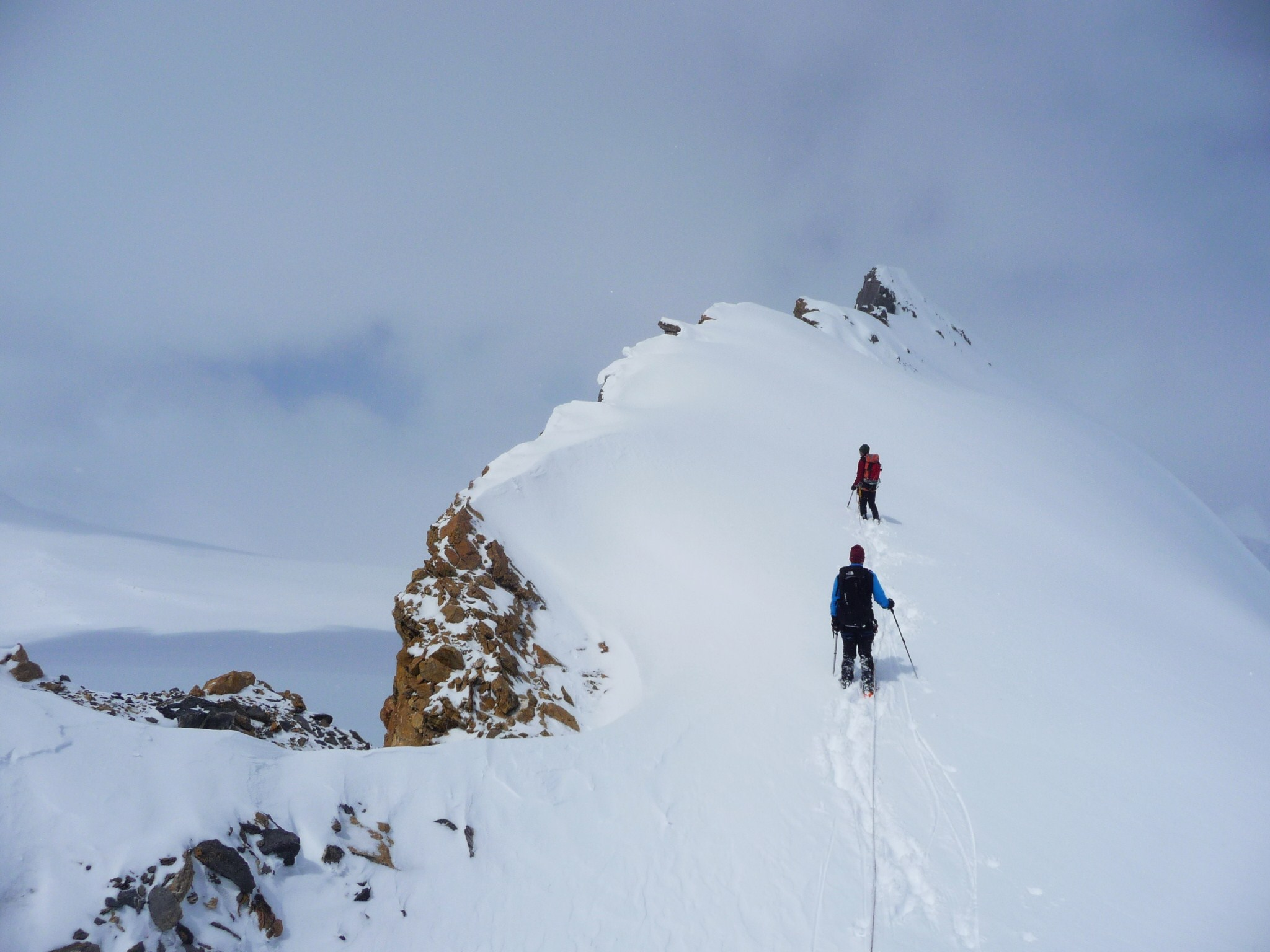
Saint Nicholas Peak summit

== See also ==
- Geography of British Columbia
- List of peaks on the British Columbia–Alberta border
