= Fay hut =

- Location within British Columbia

General information
- Type: alpine hut
- Architectural style: Log cabin
- Location: Prospectors Valley, Canada
- Coordinates: 51°15′45″N 116°12′29″W
- Opened: Original: 1927; Rebuild: 2005
- Destroyed: Original: 2003; forest fire; Rebuild: 2009; structure fire
- Owner: Alpine Club of Canada

Technical details
- Material: Wood

Design and construction
- Architect: Alpine Club of Canada

Website
- www.alpineclubofcanada.ca/facility/fay.html

The Fay hut was an alpine hut located above Prospectors Valley in Kootenay National Park, British Columbia. Although the higher Neil Colgan hut superseded it as a base for climbs in the Valley of the Ten Peaks area, it still served as a convenient base for hikers and skiers doing day trips in the area, and as an overnight stop for mountaineers continuing on to the Neil Colgan hut. A new hut was built in 2005 to replace the original Fay hut, which was destroyed by a forest fire in 2003. The Fay hut was maintained by the Alpine Club of Canada (ACC).

The new Fay Hut was destroyed by a building structure fire in April 2009. It was unoccupied at the time. The last occupants left at 11 am on April 2. The next group came in on April 4 and found the building burned to the ground. The most likely cause was the ignition of the roof material caused by pyrolysis of the wooden components from leaking hot exhaust gases from the wood fireplace. The last occupants at the hut were using the fireplace and the fire occurred shortly after the last occupants had left the hut. The solid foam plastic insulation in the attic likely contributed to a hot fast fire dripped down in burning streams to the floors below. All that was left of the building was the metal from the roof, lying on the ground. The hut was not insured and was underutilized, so it is unlikely it will be rebuilt again.

== History ==
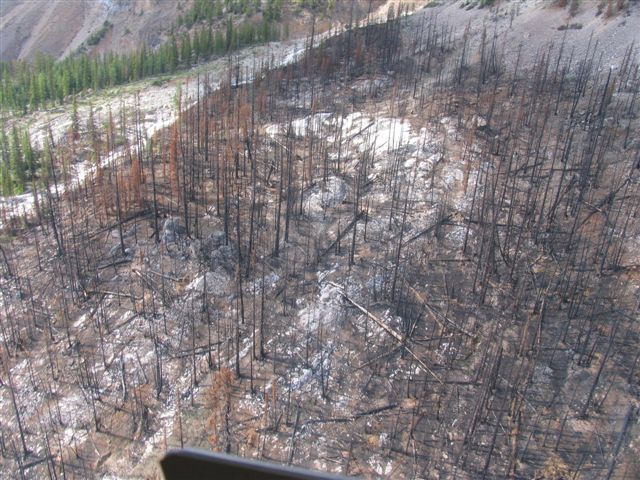
New (2005) Fay hut site in burned area

The original Fay hut was built in 1927 as a base for climbing in the Valley of the Ten Peaks area. Although it was predated by the Abbot Pass hut and the Elizabeth Parker hut, it was the first hut actually built by the Alpine Club of Canada (ACC). The other two huts were built by the Canadian Pacific Railway and turned over to the ACC some time later. The Fay hut was named for Charles Fay, a founder and the first president of the American Alpine Club. Charles Fay made 25 trips to the Canadian Rockies, participated in the first ascents of Mounts Victoria and Lefroy, and was an honorary member of the ACC.

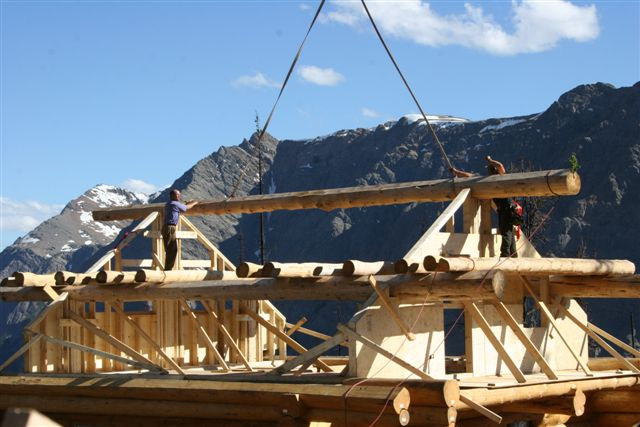
The new Fay hut under construction (2005)

The ACC operated the hut until 1972, when it turned it over to Kootenay National Park because it could not afford to pay for repairs after a tree fell through the roof. The Park operated it until 1991 when, in a reversal of philosophy, it returned it to the ACC because it did not want to pay for renovations to keep it operating. The ACC and its Rocky Mountain Section put a major effort into renovations and returned the hut to excellent condition.

The original Fay hut was destroyed in 2003 by a major forest fire that burned 12.6% of Kootenay National Park.

The new Fay hut was rebuilt by the ACC in 2005, close to the site of the original hut. Construction involved the contribution of hundreds of thousands of dollars, and thousands of hours of volunteer time, by the members of the ACC and its Rocky Mountain Section. The new hut was a modern log building, prefabricated outside of the park and airlifted to the site in 140 loads by two Bell 407 helicopters in June and July 2005. 20 volunteers a week worked on site for 4 weeks in July, 2005 to assemble the structure. There was one further week of work done in 2006 to finish some small items not completed the year before. In June 2005 85 flights were made to load most of the materials needed to complete the project. This was completed by several volunteers over a four-day period. In order for the actual construction to begin the site had to be cleared, a bridge built and a helicopter landing pad constructed.

In 2009, the new hut burned to the ground while it was unoccupied, sometime between the morning of April 2, when the last group to stay there left, and the evening of April 4, when the next group arrived. With no accommodation, the incoming group had to ski 14 kilometres (9 mi) back to the parking lot, arriving there at midnight. Only metal objects remained of the structure, as all the combustibles were consumed by the fire, leaving the metal roof lying on the ground. An investigation determined that the fire started at the point where the fireplace chimney went through the log cabin roof. The fire most likely occurred as the result of the ignition of the roof beams caused by leaking hot gases from the fireplace. The most probable cause of the wood becoming heated is that snow creep might have pushed open the joints of the chimney pipe. The hut was uninsured and no decision has been made by the Alpine Club whether to rebuild it or not.

== Access ==
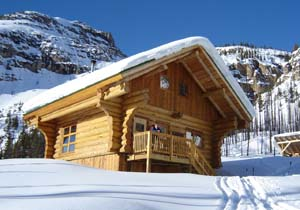
Fay Hut in Winter

Trailhead location	6.5 km (4.0 mi) west of Alberta border on Hw 93
Hiking/Skiing distance	12.8 kilometres (8.0 mi)
Elevation gain	600 metres (2,000 ft)
Approximate time	4–5 hours in summer / 5–11 hours in winter

In both summer and winter, start from the Marble Canyon parking lot 6.5 kilometres (4.0 mi) west of the Alberta border on British Columbia Highway 93 (the Banff-Radium Hiqhway).

In summer, follow the well-marked trail along Tokumm Creek for about 10 kilometres (6.2 mi) and then turn right at the trail sign indicating the route to the hut. The trail gains elevation and after about 1.5 km (1 mi) ascends a 50 m (160 ft) high rocky headwall. A rope hanging from the top of the headwall provides some help. The hut is only a few hundred metres east of the top of the rope. Note that the trail gains 450 of the 600 metres of elevation in the last 2 kilometres. The route should take about 4–5 hours.

In winter, the trail follows the same route, but route-finding after leaving Tokumm Creek can be difficult. After crossing the small bridge at 10 kilometres (6.2 mi), watch for the signpost directing you into a drainage to the east. Head along the small creek for about 50 metres (160 ft) and, after encountering a small ice wall on the right, start the climb up. There is a fixed rope to help with a short section, although it may be buried by snow. At the top, the hut is a few hundred metres to the right, but without a defined trail or a GPS you may have trouble finding it. This route should take about 5 hours, but may take up to 11 if trail breaking is required, and many groups have had to bivy overnight near the headwall.

== Facilities ==
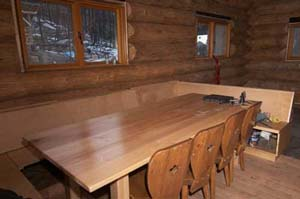
Fay hut dining area

Heating	Wood stove
Lighting	Solar and Propane
Cooking	Propane oven & range, cookware, dishes & utensils provided
Sleeping	Dormitory style on thick foam mattresses
Capacity	12 in summer and winter
Drinking water	From the creek (boil or filter)
Human Waste	Outhouse (helicoptered out)
Dishwater	Ground sump
Garbage	Pack it out

Fay hut living area

The hut sleeps 12 in summer or winter on foam mattresses. It is equipped with both solar lighting and propane powered lamps. It has a propane stovetop and oven, and a wood-burning stove for heating in the winter.

== Activities ==
The hut was originally built as a base for mountaineering in the Valley of the Ten Peaks area, but has since been superseded for that purpose by the Neil Colgan hut. However, it is still possible to make ascents in this area using Fay hut as a base, and peaks like Mount Little, Mount Fay, and Mount Quadra are the most common.

For hiking and backcountry skiing, the trip up Tokumm Creek itself is worthwhile and highly scenic. Continuing along the trail past the turnoff to the hut to the Kaufmann Lake junction is also a good objective, but as of 2007, the trail past the turnoff had not been cleared of deadfall from the forest fire. Skiing from the Fay hut to the Neil Colgan hut is also possible, but should be considered ski mountaineering and can be challenging if conditions are not ideal.

== Parks Canada information ==
Fay hut is in Kootenay National Park. All vehicles stopping in a National Park must have a Park Motor Vehicle Permit. Annual or single day permits can be purchased at most Park entrance gates and Park visitor centres.

Banff, Jasper, Kootenay, Yoho, and Glacier National Parks collect a fee for backcountry overnight use in the Parks. The fees collected from the wilderness passes go towards maintaining trails, supplying the voluntary registration service, avalanche forecasting, backcountry bridge-building, etc. Overnight users of the Fay hut (ages 16 and over) are required to pay this fee.

The maximum group size for hiking is 10 persons. If your group is larger, you will need to split into smaller groups.

Natural hazards are part of every visit to the Rocky Mountains. It is recommended that anyone participating in hazardous activities in the backcountry register with the Park Wardens. This registration is free and is the best method of ensuring that someone comes looking for you when the worst happens. You can register at any Parks Canada Visitor Centre.

== Nearby ==
- Neil Colgan hut
- Valley of the Ten Peaks
- Moraine Lake
- Panorama Ridge

== Maps ==
Map reference	NTS 82N8 Lake Louise
Grid reference	552793
GPS coordinates	51° 15' 45" N, 116° 12' 29" NAD83 11U 555256 5679315
Hut elevation	2,108 metres (6,916 ft)

- Lake Louise and Yoho (Map). 1:50,000. Guides for Hiking and Recreation in the Canadian Rockies. Gem Trek Publishing. ISBN 1-895526-64-7. Archived from the original on 2009-02-02. This map shows the trails and highlights of the area.
- 82N/8 (Lake Louise) (Map). 1:50,000. National Topographic System (NTS). Canadian Government. Archived from the original on 2007-12-24. The hut is located at grid reference 552793
- 82N/1 (Mount Goodsir) (Map). 1:50,000. National Topographic System (NTS). Canadian Government. Archived from the original on 2007-12-24. For the trail along Tokumm Creek, but not really necessary.
