= Waputik Icefield =

Glacier in Canada

Coordinates: 51°34′N 116°27′W

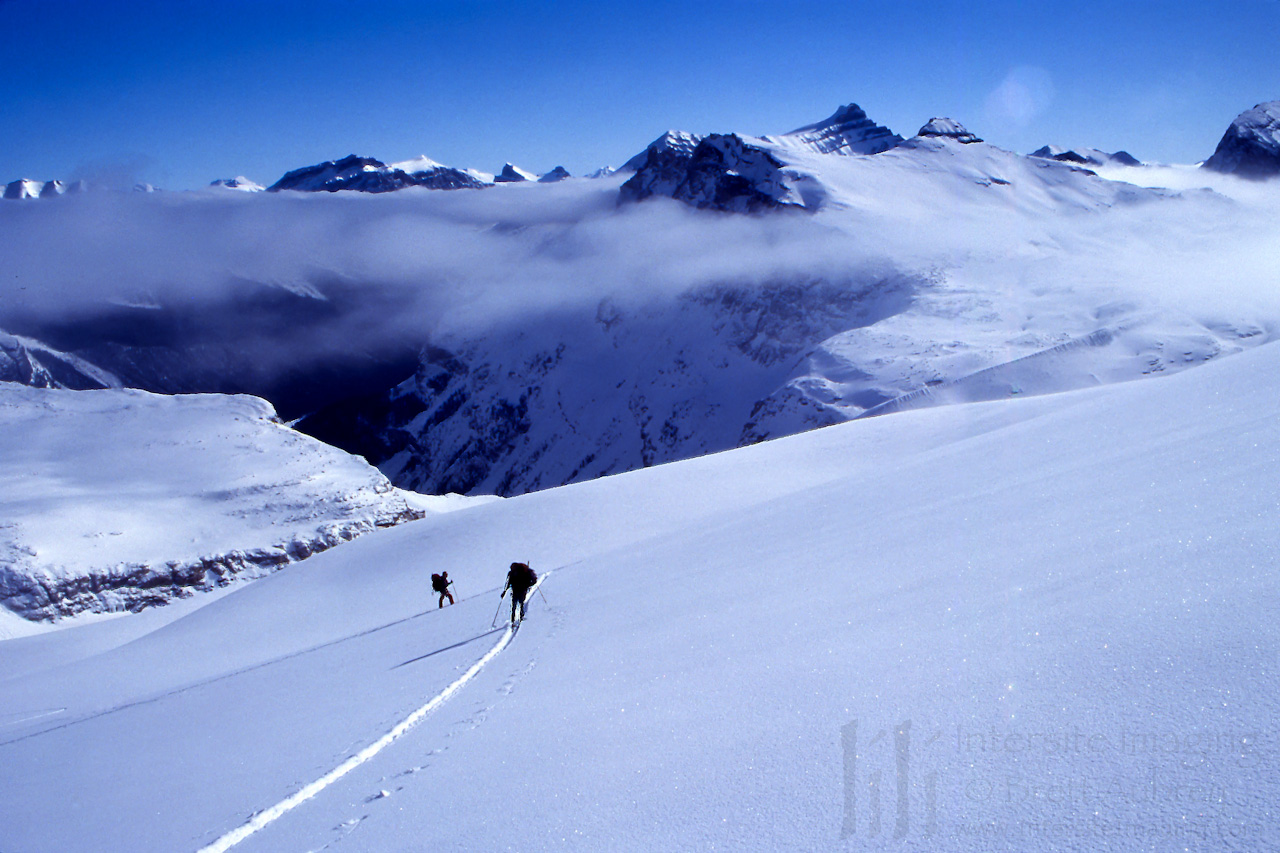
Skiing up the Waputik to Mount Balfour

The Waputik Icefield is on the Continental divide in the Canadian Rocky Mountains, in the provinces of British Columbia and Alberta. It is developed on the heights of the Waputik Range in the Central Main Ranges.

The icefield is shared by Banff and Yoho National Parks, and numerous outlet glaciers extend from the icefield. Runoff from the Waputik Icefield provides water for numerous lakes, streams and rivers including Hector Lake, and the Bow, Kicking Horse and Yoho Rivers. Runoff from the Daly Glacier feeds Takakkaw Falls.

The icefield encompasses 40 km^{2} (15 sq mi) and is 20 km (12 mi) northwest of Lake Louise, on the west side of the Icefields Parkway.

The icefield is easily accessible by mountaineers in both the summer and winter. Both ski trips in the winter and glacier hiking trips in the summer often combine a traverse of this icefield with a trip across the Wapta Icefield directly to the north.

== Glaciers ==
The following glaciers are part of this icefield:

- Waputik Glacier
- Diableret Glacier
- Glacier des Poilus
- Emerald Glacier
- Bath Glacier
- Niles Glacier
- Balfour Glacier
- Daly Glacier
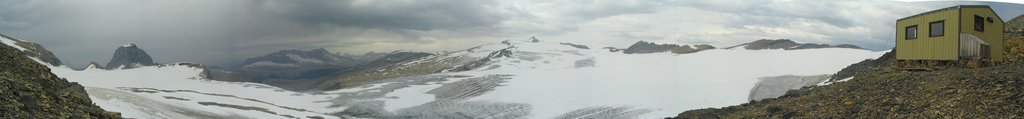
A panoramic photo of the Waputik Icefield taken from the Scott Duncan Hut in 2005

== Huts ==
There are two huts operated by the Alpine Club of Canada which are accessible from this icefield:

- Scott Duncan Hut
- Balfour Hut

== See also ==
- List of glaciers
