= Canadian Police and Peace Officers' Memorial =

Memorial in Ottawa, Ontario

- Canada
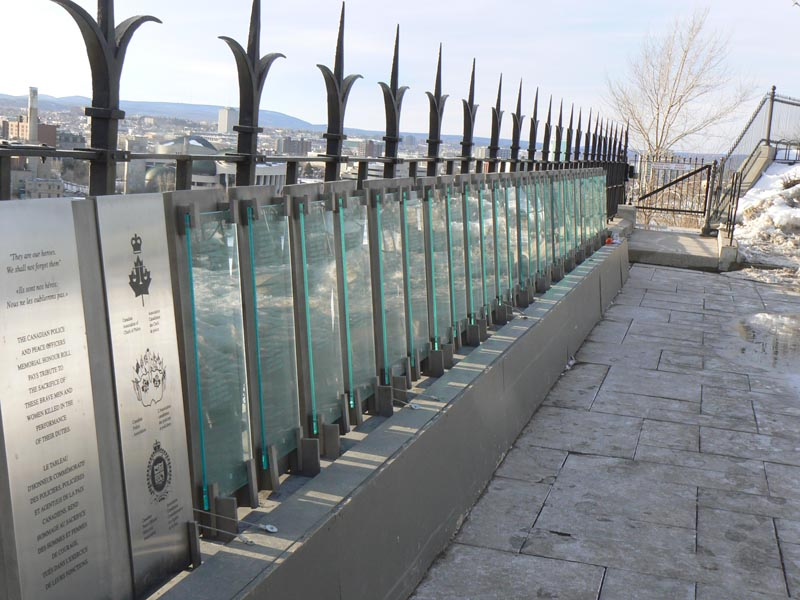
- Honour roll etched on the memorial's perimeter wall
- For law enforcement officers who have died while on duty in Canada
- Unveiled: 1994 (original); 2000 (redesign)
- Location: 45°25′30″N 75°42′05″W; Parliament Hill, Ottawa, Ontario, Canada
- They are our heroes. We shall not forget them.

The Canadian Police and Peace Officers' Memorial is a memorial in Ottawa, Ontario, commemorating approximately 900 Canadian law enforcement officers killed in the course of their duties. Dedicated in 1994, it is located at the northwest corner of the Parliament Hill grounds, overlooking the Ottawa River. The memorial consists of the Police Memorial Pavilion, a reconstruction of a 1877 gazebo by Thomas Seaton Scott, and a glass-and-steel perimeter wall etched with the names of the fallen officers, which was designed by landscape architectural firm Phillips Farevaag Smallenberg.

Initially conceived to recognize only police and corrections officers murdered in the line of duty, criteria for inclusion on the memorial's honour roll were quickly expanded to all law-enforcement officers whose deaths resulted from events associated with their duties. To accommodate the increasing number of names on the roll, the memorial was redesigned in 2000, for which it won a Professional Award from the Canadian Society of Landscape Architects.

In 1998, the last Sunday in September was declared Police and Peace Officers' National Memorial Day, and starting in 2003 flags were lowered to half-mast in observance of that date. Annual memorial ceremonies attract thousands of law-enforcement officers and their families to Parliament Hill.

== Background ==
On 11 July 1978, a warrant was being executed by four Ottawa Police Service (OPS) officers, including David Kirkwood, a 21-year-old with four months of service, and his training officer. The subject of the warrant began shooting, killing Kirkwood and initiating a siege that involved more than 50 officers, 6 of whom were shot.

A special service for Kirkwood was held on Parliament Hill on 24 September 1978. This began a tradition of observances by the OPS and launched the effort to recognize slain police officers. Among those championing a memorial was Jim Kingston, executive manager of the Ontario Provincial Police Association (OPPA) and later CEO of the Canadian Police Association (CPA). At the 1984 service, the Office of the Solicitor General and the Canadian Association of Chiefs of Police (CACP) introduced a memorial book of remembrance.

== Organization and honour roll ==
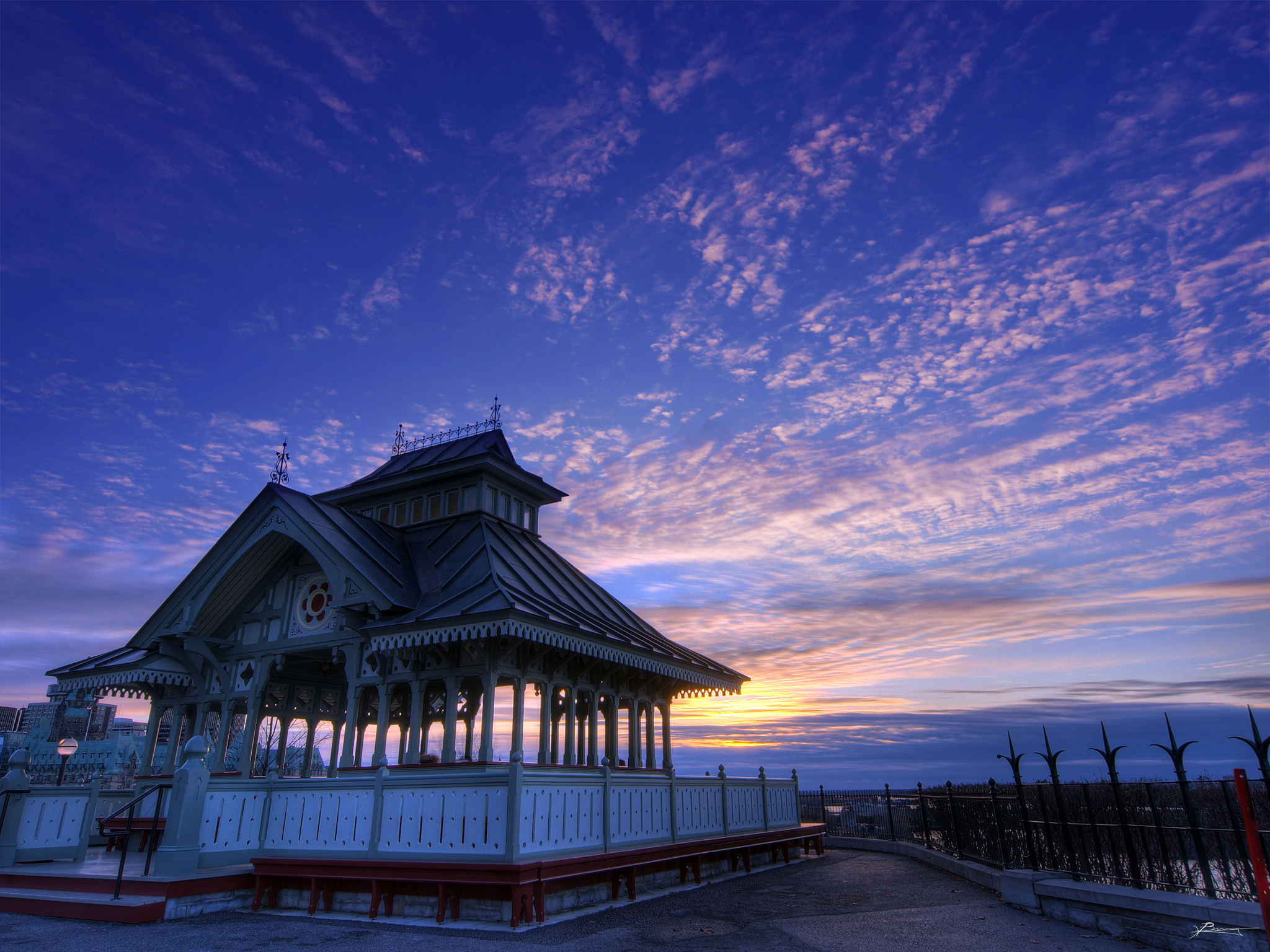
Memorial at sunset

A national police memorial was dedicated on 22 March 1994. It is managed by the Canadian Peace Officers' Memorial Association (CPOMA), which receives applications for inclusion on the memorial's honour roll. At its unveiling, 227 names were inscribed.

The memorial initially recognized police and corrections officers murdered in the line of duty. This was extended to those killed in the line of duty and, in 1995, further expanded to include peace officers in all areas of law enforcement, (Note: In addition to police officers and prison guards, peace officers represented include Customs Officers, Fishery Officers, Parks Officers, and Environmental Enforcement and Wildlife Enforcement Officers.) effective retroactively to 1879. In 2019, there were more than 880 names on the honour roll.

There has been a trend of increasing concern about suicides and recognizing death by suicide – viewing this as death by result of duty-related mental illness. (Note: In April 2017, a legal settlement made it possible for those who died from mental health injuries suffered in the line of duty to be included on the Toronto Police Service memorial wall. The chief coroner of Ontario investigated the suicides of nine police officers in the province in 2018.) According to a member of an organizing committee, the concept of including officers who had taken their own lives was brought forward in the 1990s, but met opposition from the family members of officers already on the honour roll. In 2019, the CACP and CPA stated that there are continuing talks on the issue.

== Initial design and construction ==
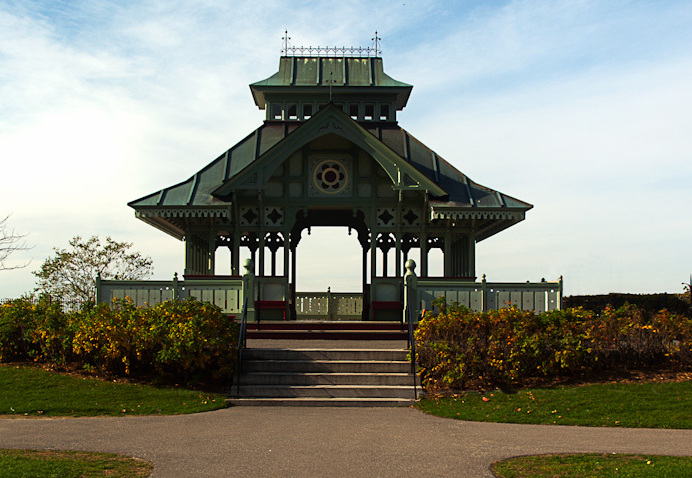
Police Memorial Pavilion

The memorial is primarily a reconstruction of the Summer Pavilion, a gazebo built for the Speaker of the House of Commons in 1877 by Thomas Seaton Scott and demolished in 1956. Called the Police Memorial Pavilion, the reconstruction is located behind the Parliament Buildings on the northwest corner of the Parliament Hill grounds, overlooking the Ottawa River.

The simple structure was intended as a place to rest and peacefully reflect. Granite stones bore the names of the officers who gave their lives on duty. The memorial was constructed at a cost of $570,000, contributed by police officers across Canada.

The inscription space on the granite tablets began filling sooner than expected, due to the broadened scope for inclusion on the honour roll. The tablets were also found to be problematic, as their scale conflicted with that of the pavilion. This problem would be compounded if more tablets were added, so a redesign was sought.

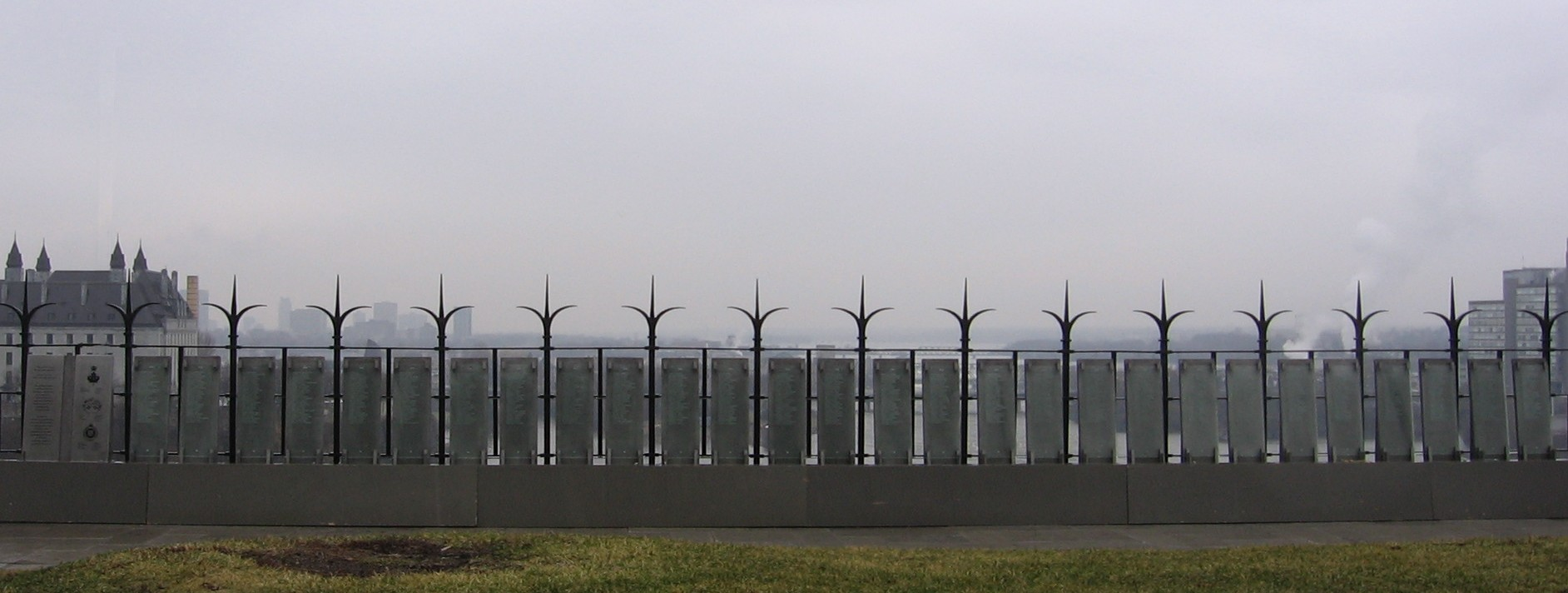
Memorial perimeter wall

Landscape architectural firm Phillips Farevaag Smallenberg – in collaboration with police and peace officers' associations, city officials and the community – designed a new memorial with the names of officers etched on stainless steel panels, set on glass on a low stone perimeter wall adjacent to the pavilion. Kim O'Connell wrote in the journal of the American Society of Landscape Architects that the redesign showed strength while incorporating "dramatic views from Parliament Hill". The Canadian Society of Landscape Architects recognized the redesign as one of twelve outstanding projects at their 2001 Professional Awards. The redesign was unveiled at the 2000 memorial service, along with a new honour roll, and the granite stones were retired.

== Ceremonies and observances ==
A special service for Kirkwood was held on Parliament Hill on 24 September 1978. The ceremony opened with a two-gun salute fired by the 30th Field Artillery Regiment. (Note: The Ottawa Police Service and the 30th Field Artillery Regiment, nicknamed the Bytown Gunners, were both founded in 1855 and have a long history of mutual support. One of the brass shell cases from the first two-gun salute was mounted as a commemorative piece and presented to the police with the inscription "to fallen comrades, Parliament Hill, September 24, 1978".) This began a tradition of observances for police officers murdered on duty.

On 22 March 1994, the memorial was inaugurated by Prime Minister Jean Chrétien, CPA and CACP, at a ceremony attended by more than 700 police officers and family members.

A formal, national Memorial Day gives Canadians an opportunity each year to formally express appreciation for the dedication of police and peace officers, who make the ultimate, tragic sacrifice to keep communities safe.

— Andy Scott, Solicitor General of Canada

On 24 September 1998, the last Sunday in September was declared Police and Peace Officers' National Memorial Day. The official declaration noted that the day would "pay tribute to the hard work, dedication and sacrifices made by Canadian police and peace officers".

In 2003, changes to the Rules For Half-Masting the National Flag of Canada included half-masting on Police and Peace Officers' National Memorial Day.

The ceremony has drawn large crowds to Parliament Hill, attracting about 4,000 people in 2013. These include law enforcement officers from across the continent to honour their colleagues. The names of all officers on the honour roll are read, a cannon is fired, and church bells ring 11 times at 11 am.

Since 2011, members of various police services and law-enforcement agencies have conducted companion bicycle rally and relay run events, which meet at Parliament Hill the Saturday before Police and Peace Officers' National Memorial Day. The Canadian Police Memorial Ride to Remember began in 2000, and covers 640 kilometres (400 mi) from the Ontario Police College in Aylmer, Ontario. The National Peace Officers' Memorial Run to Remember was first held in 2005, starting at the Ontario Police Memorial in Toronto's Queen's Park and covers 460 km (290 mi) over three days. The events seek to raise awareness about the memorial service and raise money for several initiatives, including trust funds for the families of deceased officers.

During the COVID-19 pandemic, ceremonies were restricted to about 30 participants, with invitations going to dignitaries, next-of-kin and heads of departments and agencies. Others could view the ceremony on temporary video wall installations or through live video streams on the Internet. Full services for officers added to the honour roll in these years were belayed for restrictions to be lifted. No parades were held and the Ride to Remember and Run to Remember were divided into regional events.

== Statistics ==
A study of the 133 Canadian police officers murdered in the line of duty between 1960 and 2009 found:

- 65% died in the first half of the period (1960–1984)
- 23% were murdered during a robbery investigation
- 14% were murdered while responding to a domestic dispute (Note: In recent years, stopping a suspicious vehicle/person and stopping a vehicle for traffic violation have resulted in more murders of police than responding to domestic disputes.)
- Of those murdered while on vehicle patrol, 54% were assigned to two-officer vehicles and 46% to one-officer vehicles
- On average, murdered police officers had under 5 years service
- 30% of the murders involved multiple accused persons
- 92% of murdered officers were shot to death
- About two-thirds of the police officers did not have an opportunity to defend themselves
- 96% of the killings have been solved

== See also ==
- National Police Memorial – list of police memorials in other countries
