= William Peyto =

William Peyto may refer to:

- William Petow or Peyto, cardinal
- William Peyto (died 1464) (c. 1394–1464), MP for Warwickshire, 1420
- William Peyto (died 1734) (c. 1698–1734), MP for Warwickshire, 1715–34
- Ebenezer William "Bill" Peyto (1869–1943), English-Canadian pioneer
