= Vulture Glacier (Alberta) =

Glacier in Canada

- Location within Alberta Location within British Columbia Location within Canada
- Interactive map of Vulture Glacier
- Location: Alberta, Canada
- Coordinates: 51°37′36″N 116°32′12″W
- Area: 4.9 square kilometres (1.9 sq mi)
- Status: Receding

Vulture Glacier is located in Banff National Park, Alberta, Canada, northwest of Lake Louise, and can be viewed from the Icefields Parkway. Vulture Glacier is an outflow glacier from the Wapta Icefield, which rests along the Continental Divide. The glacier had an area of 4.9 square kilometres (1.9 sq mi) in the 1980s, however, all of the glaciers in the Canadian Rockies have been retreating steadily since the middle of the 19th century.

== See also ==
- List of glaciers in Canada
