= Peyto Lake =

Lake in Alberta, Canada

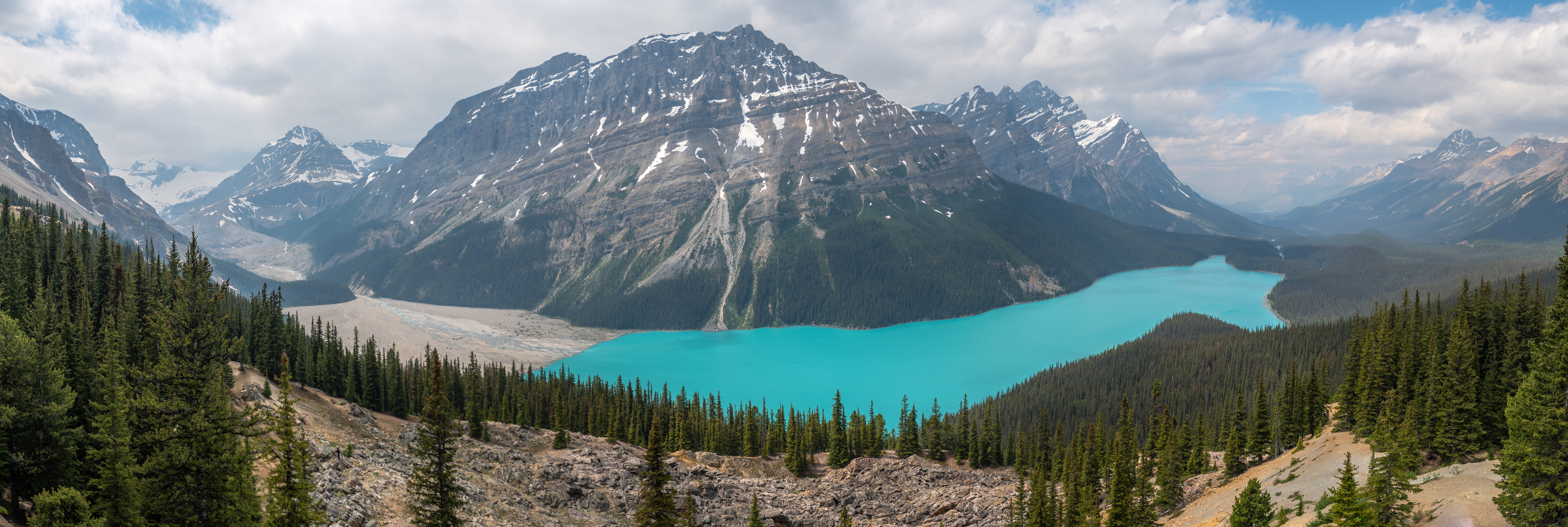

- Location within Alberta
- Location: Banff National Park, Alberta, Canada
- Coordinates: 51°43′37″N 116°31′19″W
- Type: Glacial
- Primary inflows: Peyto Creek
- Primary outflows: Mistaya River
- Basin countries: Canada
- Max. length: 2.8 km (1.7 mi)
- Max. width: 0.8 km (0.50 mi)
- Surface area: 1.4 km^{2} (0.54 mi^{2})
- Surface elevation: 1,860 m (6,100 ft)

Peyto Lake (/ˈpiːtoʊ/ PEE-toh) is a glacier-fed lake in Banff National Park in the Canadian Rockies. It is known for its striking turquoise colour making it a well visited and photographed area of the National Park. The lake is near the Icefields Parkway in Alberta, Canada.

== Geography ==
Peyto lake is formed in a valley of the Waputik Range, located between Caldron Peak, Peyto Peak and Mount Jimmy Simpson, at an elevation of 1,860 m (6,100 ft). It is fed by Peyto Creek, which drains water from Caldron Lake and Peyto Glacier (part of the Wapta Icefield). Peyto Lake is the source of the Mistaya River, which heads northwest from the lake's outflow.

During the summer, significant amounts of glacial rock flour flow into the lake from the Peyto Glacier, and these suspended rock particles are what give the lake a bright, turquoise colour. Because of this, the lake is one of the most frequently photographed location in the Candian Rockies and the area around the lake is a popular sightseeing spot. In 2021, Parks Canada completed improvements to the lake viewpoint, trails, and parking areas. The lake is best seen from Bow Summit, the highest point on the Icefields Parkway.

Peyto Lake seen from Bow Summit

== History ==
Peyto Lake was named after an early park warden of Banff National Park by the name of Ebenzer William “Bill” Peyto. Bill was an English-born mountain guide and trapper who came to the Canadian Rockies in the late 19th century. He became well known for guiding explorers through the region. In 1896, Walter Wilcoux, a topographer, explored the area with Bill and named the Peyto Peak and lake after him. It was not until 1911 when the Geographic Board of Canada approved the name of the lake as Peyto Lake and recorded it in their database in 1934.
