= Banff Mountain Film Festival =

Event in Alberta, Canada

The Banff Centre Mountain Film Festival, formerly Banff Festival of Mountain Films, is an international film competition and annual presentation of films and documentaries about mountain culture, sports, environment and adventure & exploration, held every fall (October/November) in Banff, Alberta, Canada. Immediately after the festival in November, a selection of the best films entered in the festival goes on tour around the world.

The Banff Mountain Book Festival is held concurrently with the film festival. This literary festival is focused on mountain literature, and features guest speakers, readings, seminars, and an international book competition.

== History ==
The festival was launched in 1976 as the Banff Festival of Mountain Films by The Banff Centre.

== Description ==
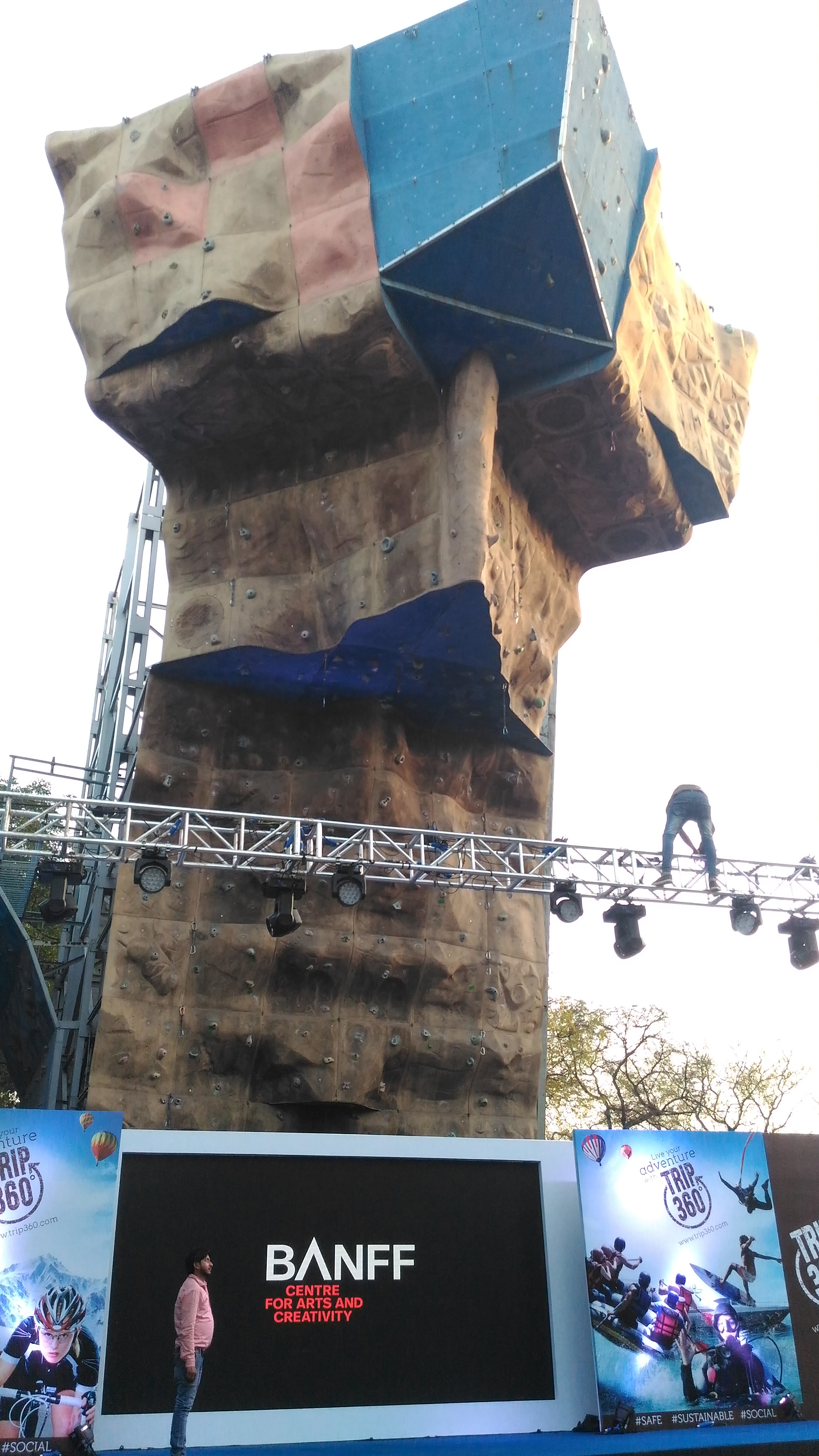
2017 Banff Mountain Film festival at IMF Delhi

Banff Mountain Film Festival is held every fall in Banff, Alberta, Canada.

Immediately after the festival in November, a selection of the best films entered in the festival goes on tour. The host organization in each tour location chooses a program that reflects the interests of their community. Each community creates a unique celebration of local adventure and adventurers.

=== Music of Banff ===
The music was composed by Jacques Blackstone. He was commissioned in the late 1990s by Banff Centre to write a theme for the festival. The "voice" for the intro is provided by Richard Armstrong, a New York-based teacher and performer who conducts International Voice Workshops. The film clips come from the films that are entered in each year's festival.

== Film selection ==
Approximately 400 films are entered into the film festival annually, and approx. 70–80 films are selected by a pre-screening committee and the festival team to be shown at the festival. During the festival, the international film festival jury chooses the best films and presents awards in various categories.

Every year the Banff World Tour team chooses about 35–40 films that feature a range of styles and themes, including climbing, skiing, kayaking, biking, adventure, culture, and the environment. The hosts try to choose the films that are best suited for their local audience and event. Most World Tour screenings include a range of different themes (adventure sports, environment, mountain culture, heritage, etc.) and styles (action-filled shorts; longer, more comprehensive films; amateur and professional productions; etc.).

== Winners ==
Finding Farley was the top film at the 2009 Banff Mountain Film Festival, receiving both the Grand Prize and People's Choice Award.

Mi Chacra, directed and produced by Jason Burlage, was the top film at the 2010 Banff Mountain Film Festival, receiving the Grand Prize.

=== Audience Choice Award ===
The Audience Choice Award, previously known as the People's Choice Award, is an award voted for by viewers of the Film Festival.

2010s
Year	Film	Director	Producer
2018	The Bikes of Wrath	Cameron Ford and Charlie Turnbull	Doss Flamingoss
2019	The Trilogy	Tommy Joyce	Sasha DiGiulian

2020s
Year	Film	Director	Producer
2020	Running The Roof	Ben Crocker, Alexis Tymon	Jody Bragger, Ben Crocker, Alexis Tymon
2021	Precious Leader Woman	Cassie De Colling	Hayley Morin, Mack Stannard
2022	Wild Waters	David Arnaud	Red Bull Media House, MOVIO
2023	Yamnuska: The Ragged Edge	John Price	Sherpas Cinema, Malcolm Sangster

== See also ==
- Mike Mortimer
- Festivals in Alberta
- Mountain film
