= Peyto Glacier =

Glacier in Canada

Coordinates: 51°40′41″N 116°32′50″W

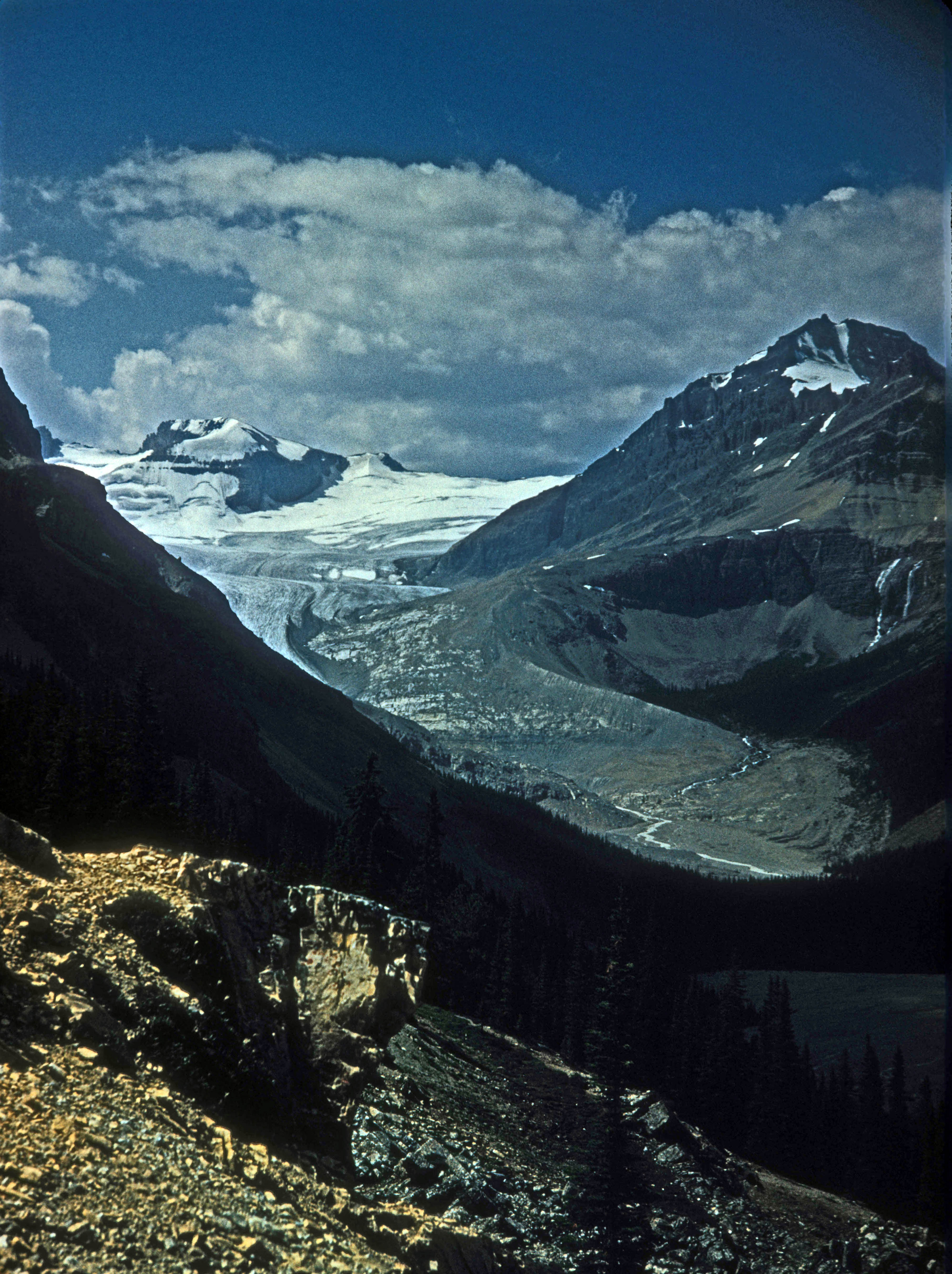
- Peyto Glacier and part of the Wapta Icefield as seen from near the Peyto Lake lookout - Mt. Habel in the icefield.

- Location within Alberta Location within British Columbia Location within Canada
- Interactive map of Peyto Glacier
- Type: Mountain glacier
- Location: Alberta, Canada
- Length: 90 km (56 mi)

Peyto Glacier is situated in the Canadian Rockies in Banff National Park, Alberta, Canada, approximately 90 km (56 mi) northwest of the town of Banff, and can be accessed from the Icefields Parkway.

== Geography ==
Peyto Glacier is an outflow glacier from the Wapta Icefield, which rests along the Continental divide. The glacier snout is subject to high melt rates from season to season and there is marked surface lowering on several parts of the glacier. Glacial silt, which is carried from the glacier by streams, ensures a turquoise appearance to Peyto Lake, a popular touring destination.

As is true for the vast majority of glaciers worldwide, Peyto Glacier has been retreating rapidly, especially since the last half of the 20th century, and has reportedly lost 70% of its mass since it was first researched (Demuth and Keller, 2006). Between 1896 and 1966, the total volume loss of the Peyto Glacier was 1088.5 million m^{3} (Wallace, 1995). A 1896's photograph by Walter D. Wilcox was the first record of this glacier, although the significant research did not start until 1965. In 1987, an automatic weather station was constructed near the glacier that monitors temperature changes, radiation and precipitation.

Peyto Glacier provides the most direct access to Peyto Hut, a base of both summer and winter mountaineering.

== See also ==
- List of glaciers in Canada
