= Bow Glacier =

Glacier in Alberta, Canada

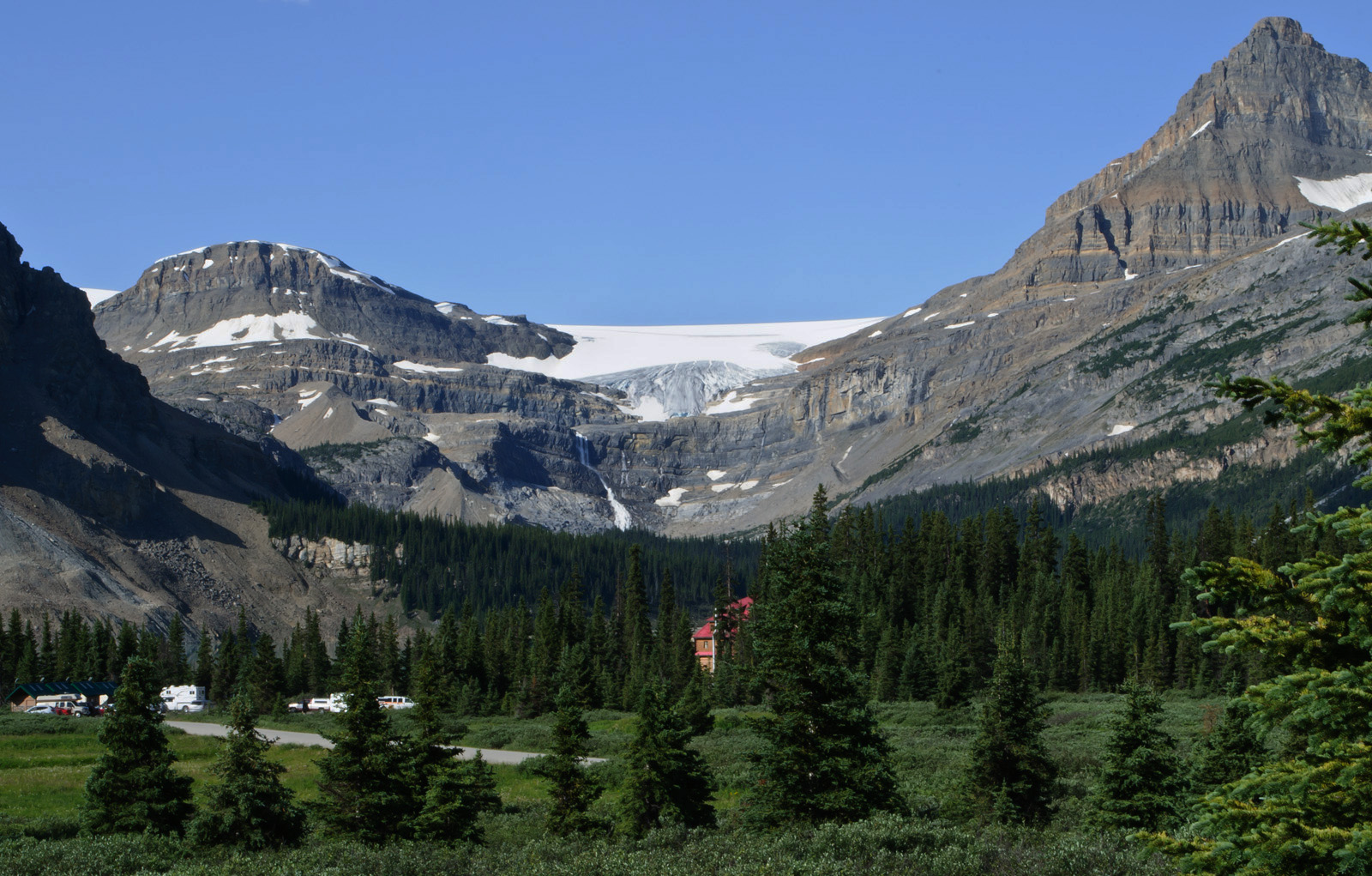
- Bow Glacier above Bow Lake

- Location within Alberta Location within British Columbia Location within Canada
- Interactive map of Bow Glacier
- Location: Alberta, Canada
- Coordinates: 51°38′47″N 116°30′40″W
- Terminus: Moraine
- Status: Receding

Bow Glacier is located in Banff National Park, Alberta, Canada, approximately 37 km (23 mi) northwest of Lake Louise. It can be viewed from the Icefields Parkway. Bow Glacier is an outflow glacier from the Wapta Icefield, which rests along the Continental Divide. Runoff from the glacier supplies water to Bow Lake and the Bow River. The glacier is credited for creating the Bow Valley before retreating at the end of the Last Glacial Maximum.

Since the end of the Little Ice Age in 1850, Bow Glacier has been in a state of overall steady retreat. Between 1850 and 1953, the glacier retreated an estimated 1,100 metres (3,610 ft), and since that period, there has been further retreat which has left a newly formed lake at the terminal moraine at the glacial snout. Sedimentation has also increased in Bow Lake due to increased erosion of soil that had been protected by the glacier, creating a small sediment delta at the western end of the lake.

== See also ==
- List of glaciers in Canada
