= Wapta Icefield =

Glacier in Alberta and British Columbia, Canada

Wapta Glacier
- Wapta ice fields
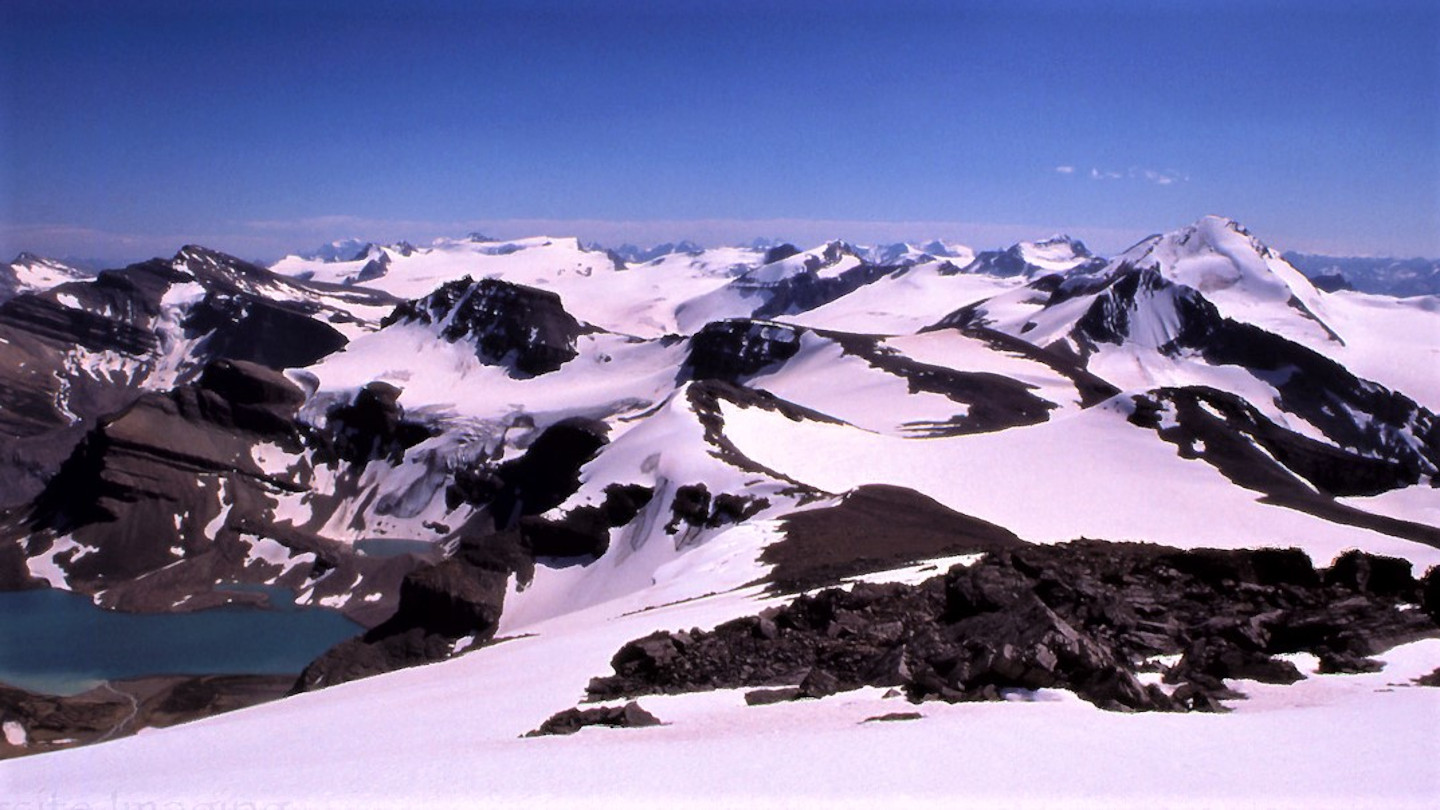
- The Wapta Icefield from Mistaya Mountain

- Location within Alberta Location within British Columbia Location within Canada
- Interactive map of Wapta Glacier
- Location: Alberta, Canada
- Coordinates: 51°38′22″N 116°31′35″W
- Status: Receding

The Wapta Icefield is a series of glaciers located on the Continental Divide in the Waputik Mountains of the Canadian Rockies, in the provinces of British Columbia and Alberta. The icefield is shared by Banff and Yoho National Parks and numerous outlet glaciers extend from the icefield, including the Vulture, Bow and Peyto Glaciers. Runoff from the icefields and outlet glaciers supply water to both the Kicking Horse and Bow Rivers, as well as numerous streams and lakes. The name Wapta comes from a Stoney language word that means "river".

The icefield is one of the most studied in the Canadian Rockies. Currently, all evidence supports the conclusion that the icefield is shrinking in area, especially near the lowest altitudes of its outlet glaciers. This is including Peyto Glacier, as the glacier has become both shorter in length and thinner in thickness. In the 1980s the icefield covered an area of approximately 80 km^{2} (30 sq mi).

The glaciers are popular with climbers, accessible in both summer and winter. Both ski trips in the winter and glacier hiking trips in the summer often combine a traverse of this icefield with a trip across the Waputik Icefield directly to the south.

The Burgess Shale animal Waptia takes its name from these features. Their meltwater feeds the nearby Wapta falls.

== Glaciers ==
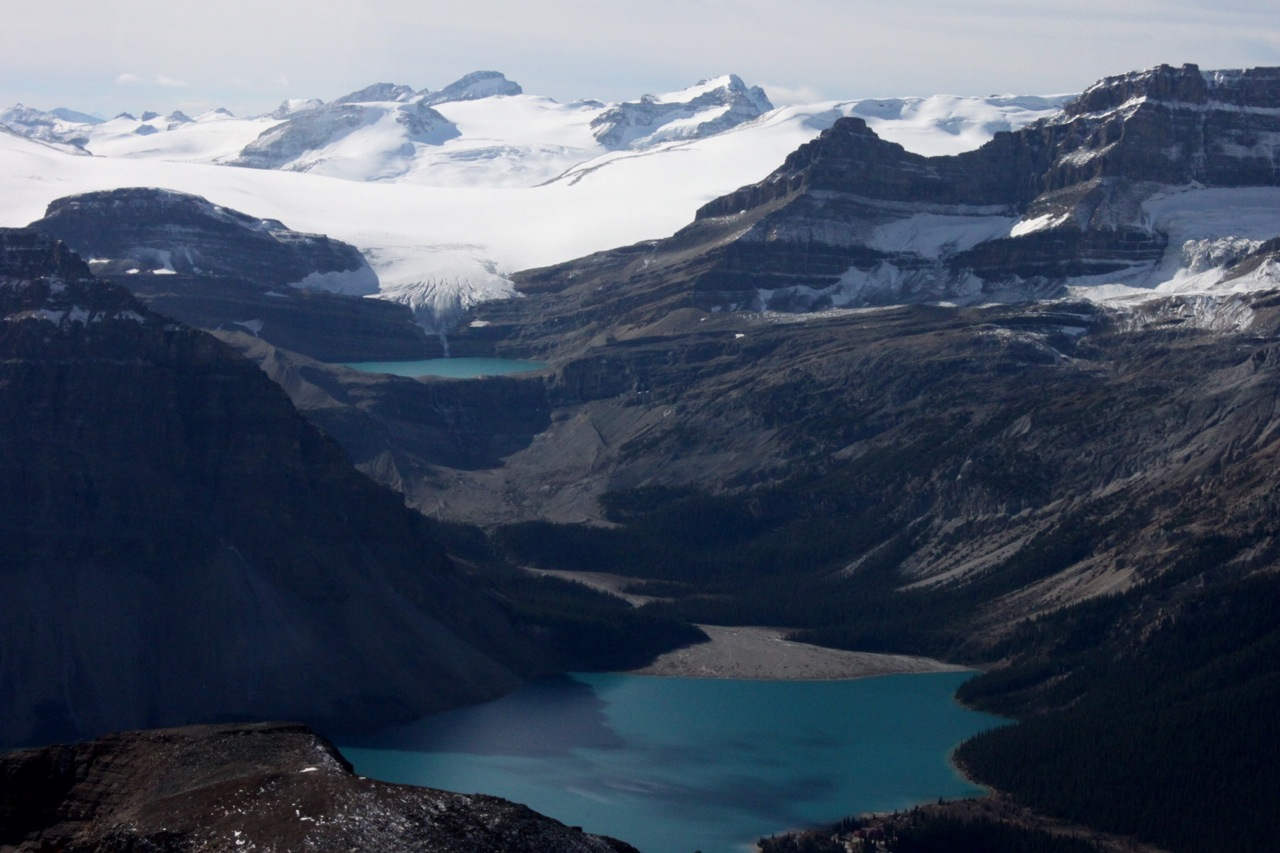
Wapta Icefield and Bow Lake seen from Cirque Peak

These are the glaciers that are part of this icefield:

- Peyto Glacier
- Bow Glacier
- Yoho Glacier
- Vulture Glacier

The Crowfoot Glacier which was once connected to this icefield is no longer part of the Wapta Icefields.

== Huts ==
There are five huts which provide accommodation to mountaineers on the Wapta Icefield that are operated by the Alpine Club of Canada.

- Bow Hut
- Peter and Catharine Whyte Hut (Peyto Hut)
- Balfour Hut
- Louise and Richard Guy Hut
- Scott Duncan Hut

== See also ==
- List of glaciers in Canada

== Bibliography ==
- "Wapta Icefield". bivouac.com.
- "Peyto Glacier Case Study". Past Variability of Canadian Glaciers. State of the Canadian Cryosphere. Archived from the original on 2006-02-15.
