= Epaulette Mountain =

Mountain in Banff NP, Alberta, Canada

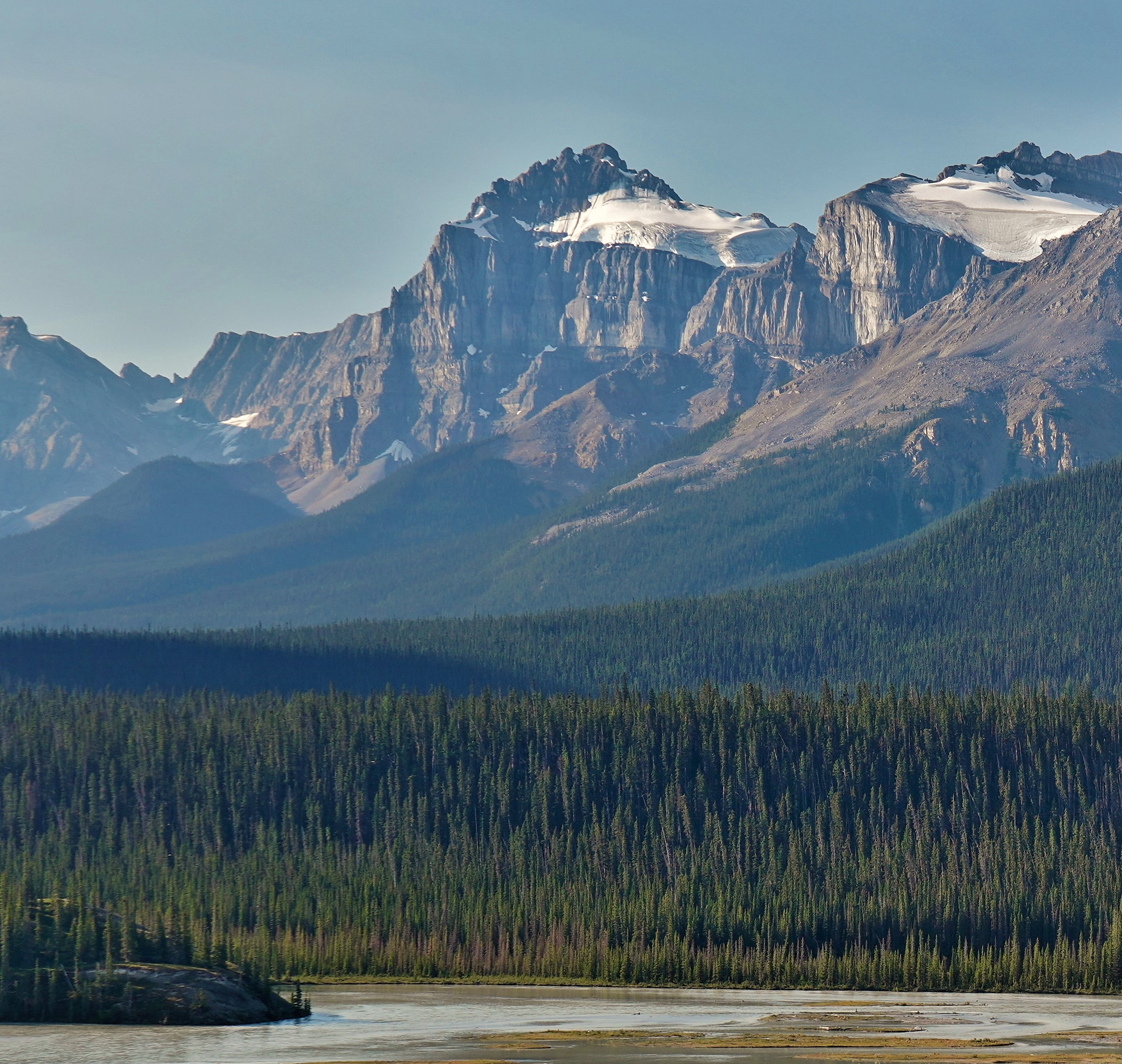
- Epaulette Mountain seen from Icefields Parkway

Highest point
- Elevation: 3,094 m (10,151 ft)
- Prominence: 259 m (850 ft)
- Parent peak: Mount Chephren (3274 m)
- Isolation: 3.64 km (2.26 mi)
- Listing: Mountains of Alberta
- Coordinates: 51°51′57″N 116°44′06″W

Geography
- Location within Alberta Location within Canada
- Country: Canada
- Province: Alberta
- Protected area: Banff National Park
- Parent range: Waputik Mountains; Canadian Rockies
- Topo map: NTS 82N15 Mistaya Lake

Geology
- Rock age: Cambrian
- Rock type: Sedimentary

Climbing
- First ascent: 1924 by F.V. Field, W.O. Field, Edward Feuz Jr.(guide)
- Easiest route: technical climb

Epaulette Mountain is a 3,094-metre (10,151-foot) mountain summit in Alberta, Canada.

== Description ==
Epaulette Mountain is located in Banff National Park and is visible from the Icefields Parkway. It is part of the Waputik Mountains, a subrange of the Canadian Rockies. The nearest higher peak is Mount Sarbach, 3.64 km (2.26 mi) to the northwest. Epaulette Mountain is situated south of Saskatchewan Crossing, where the Icefields Parkway intersects with the David Thompson Highway. Precipitation runoff from Epaulette Mountain drains east into the Mistaya River and west into Howse River, which are both tributaries of the North Saskatchewan River. Topographic relief is significant as the summit rises 1,600 meters (5,250 feet) above the Howse Valley in three kilometers (1.9 miles), and 1,400 meters (4,593 feet) above the Mistaya Valley in three kilometers.

== History ==
The first ascent of Epaulette Mountain was made in 1924 by Frederick Vanderbilt Field, William Osgood Field, and guide Edward Feuz Jr. The mountain's toponym was officially adopted June 7, 1961, by the Geographical Names Board of Canada. The descriptive name refers to the shoulder ornament on some military uniforms, and how a glacier seems to hang on a narrow shelf above the steep cliffs, thought to resemble an epaulette. Epaulette is a French word which means "little shoulders" (epaule, referring to "shoulder").

== Geology ==
Like other mountains in Banff Park, the Epaulette Mountain is composed of sedimentary rock laid down during the Precambrian to Jurassic periods. Formed in shallow seas, this sedimentary rock was pushed east and over the top of younger rock during the Laramide orogeny.

== Climate ==
Based on the Köppen climate classification, Epaulette Mountain is located in a subarctic climate zone with cold, snowy winters, and mild summers. Winter temperatures can drop below -20 °C with wind chill factors below -30 °C.

== See also ==
- Geography of Alberta
- Geology of the Rocky Mountains

== Gallery ==
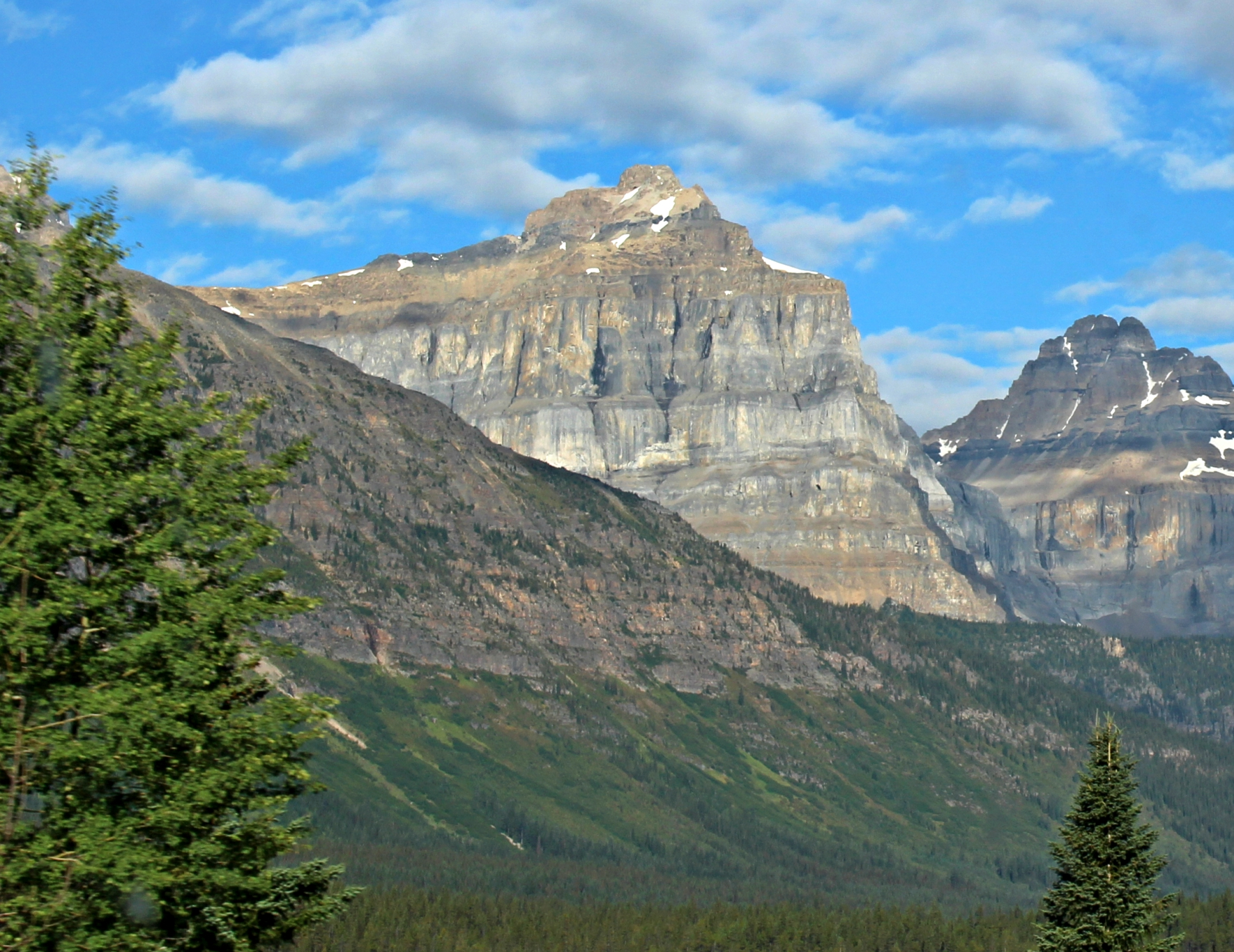
Epaulette Mountain from Waterfowl Lakes

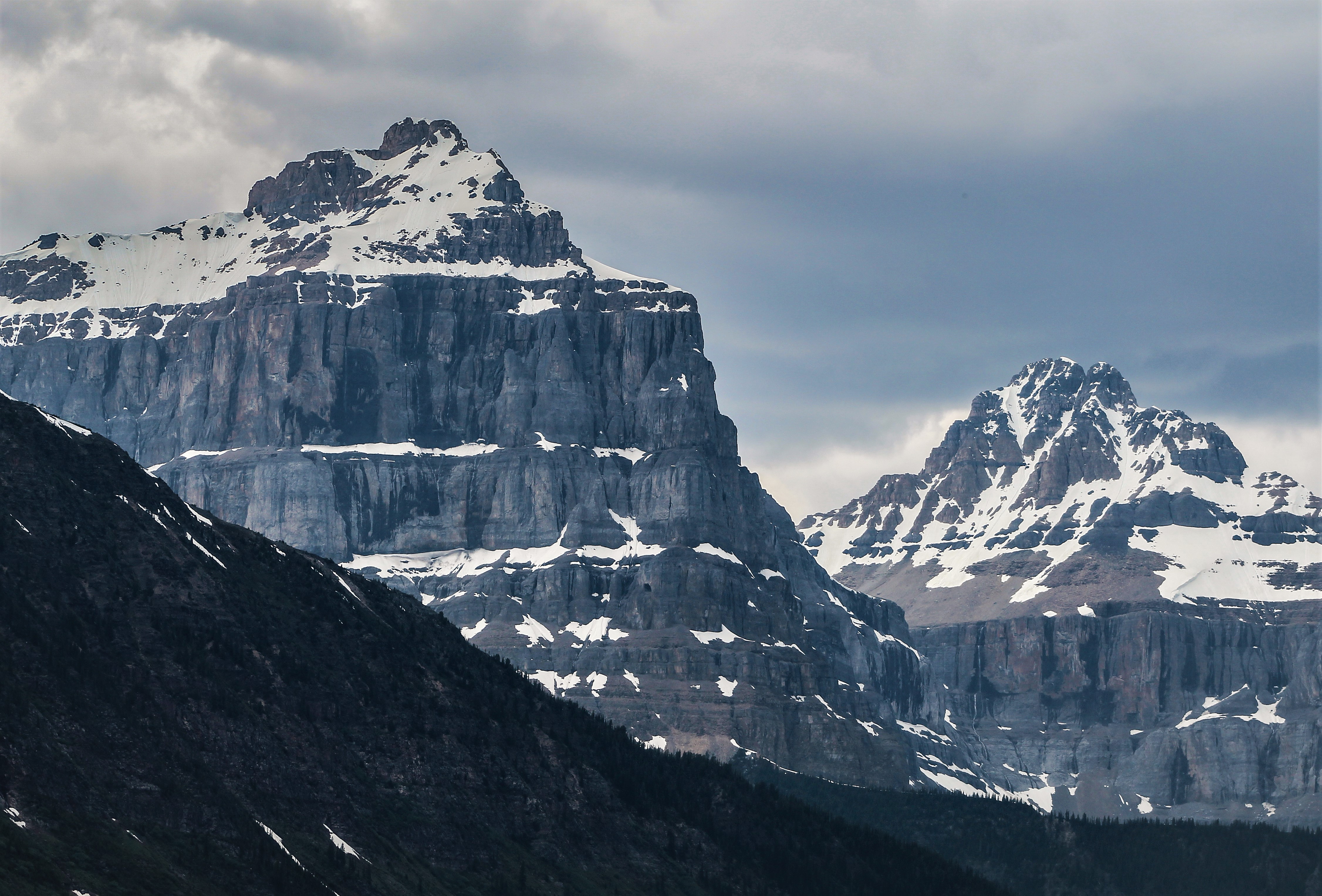
Epaulette Mountain (left) and Kaufmann Peaks (right) viewed from southeast along Icefields Parkway

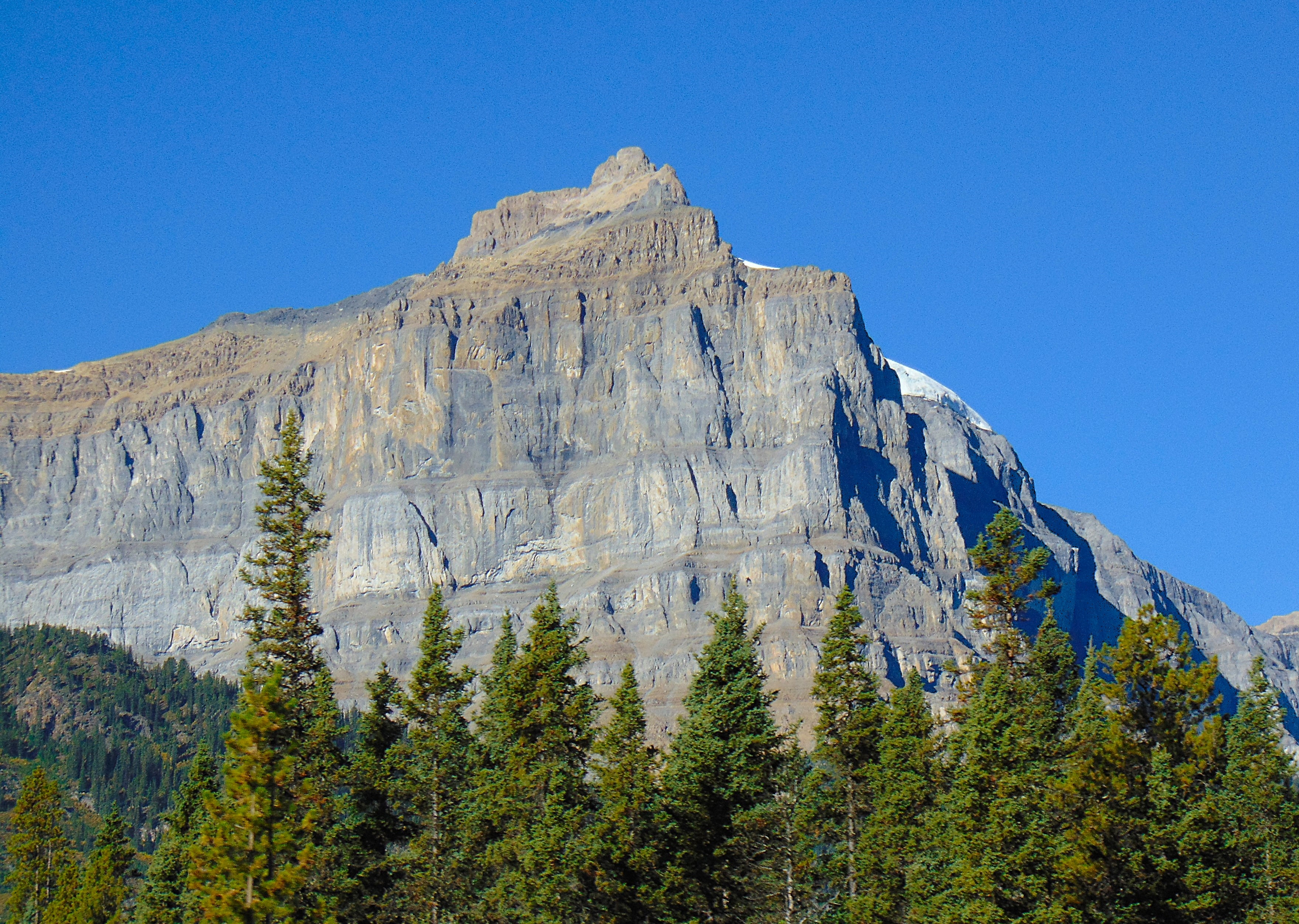
Southeast aspect

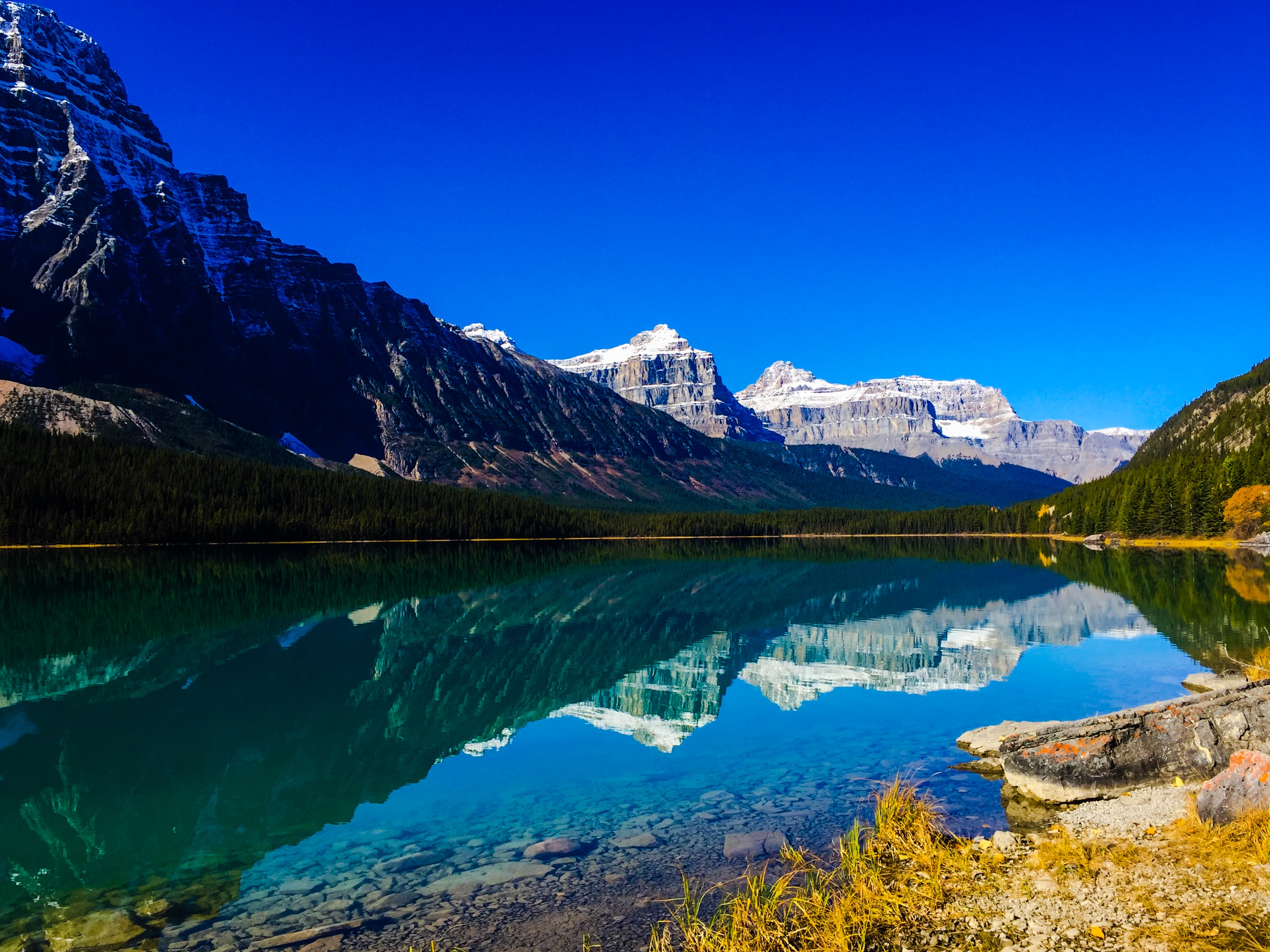
Epaulette Mountain (centered) reflected in Waterfowl Lakes

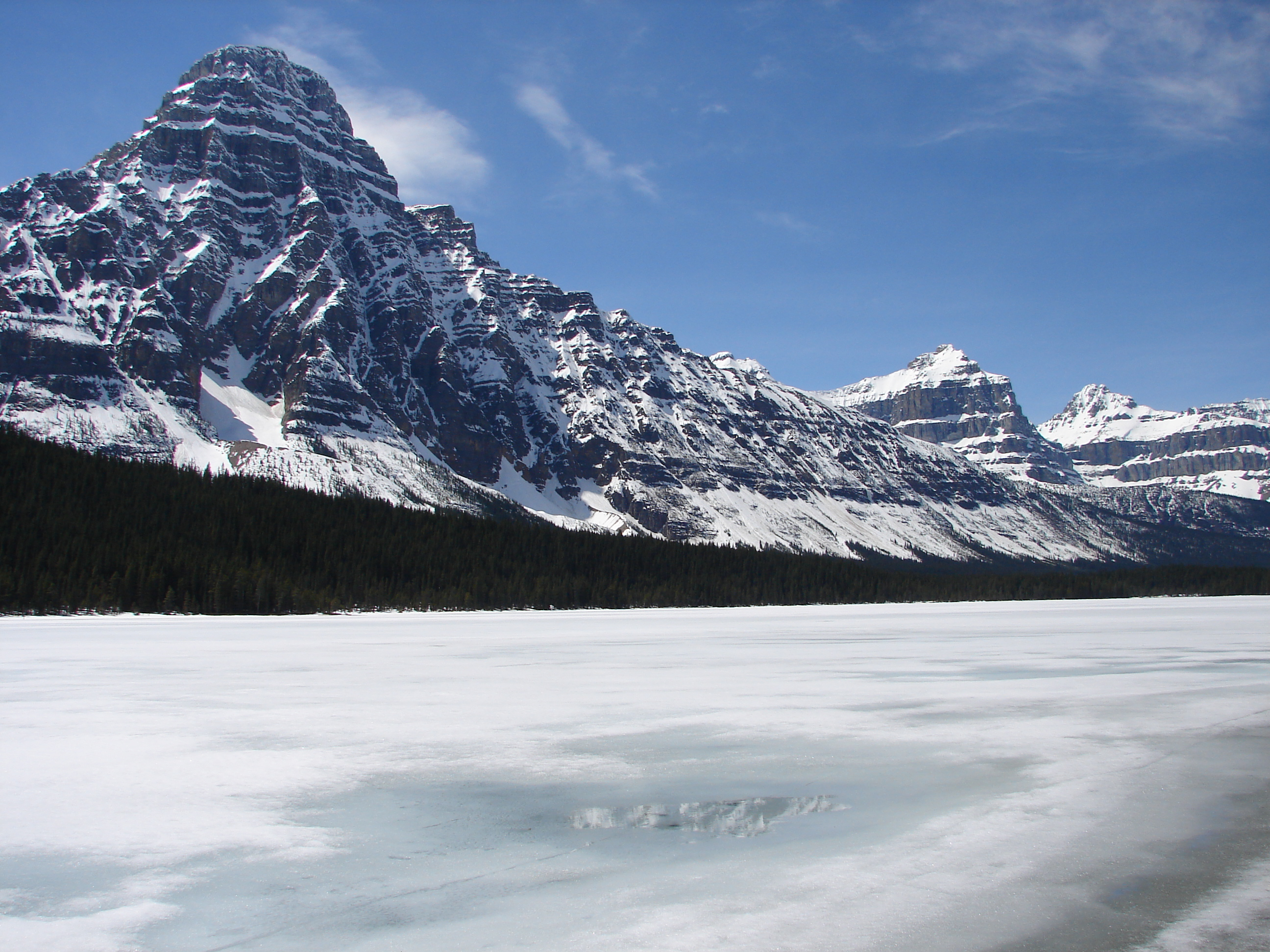
Mount Chephren (left) and Epaulette Mountain (right)

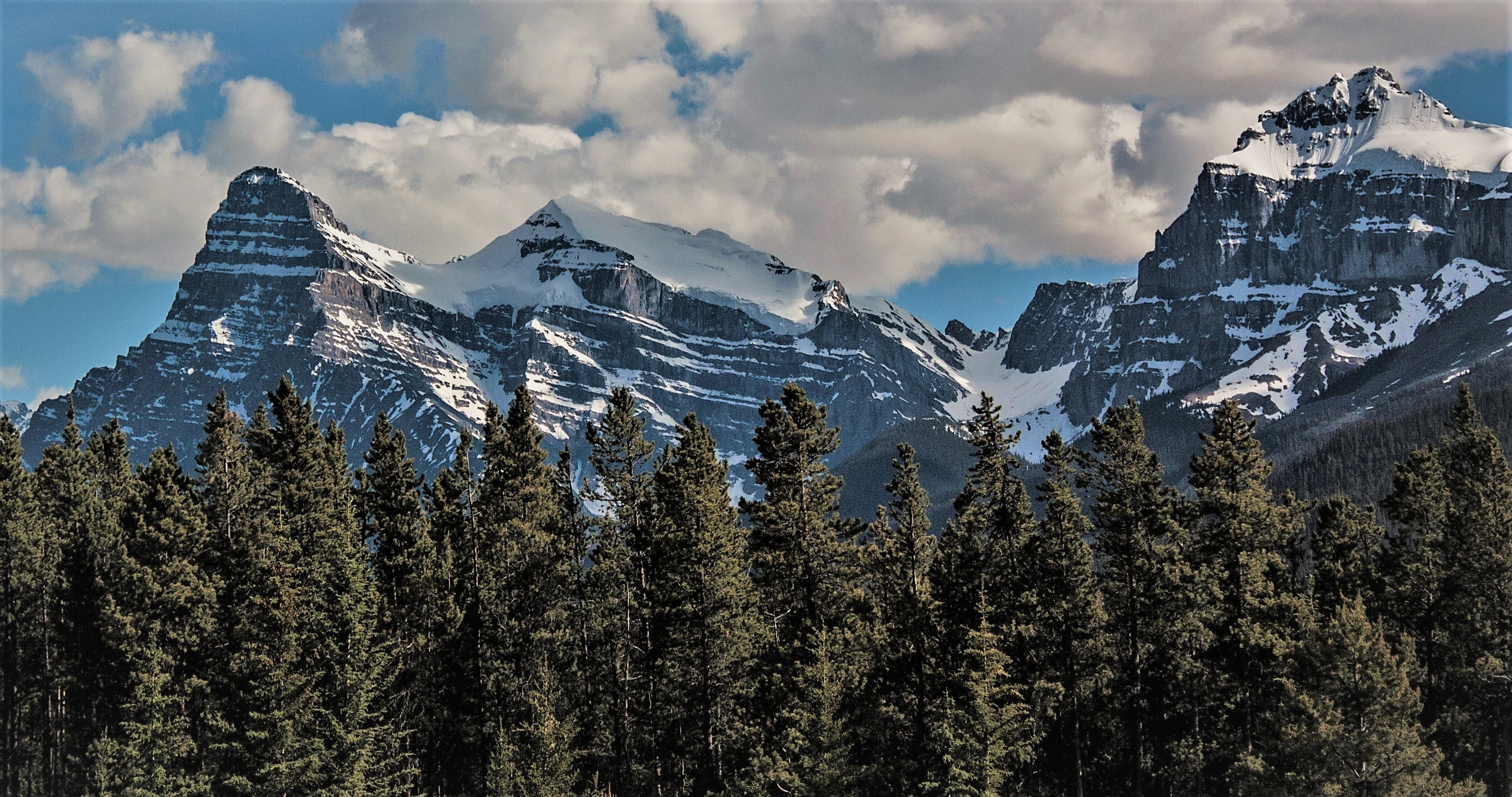
Mount Chephren (left), White Pyramid, Epaulette Mountain (right)

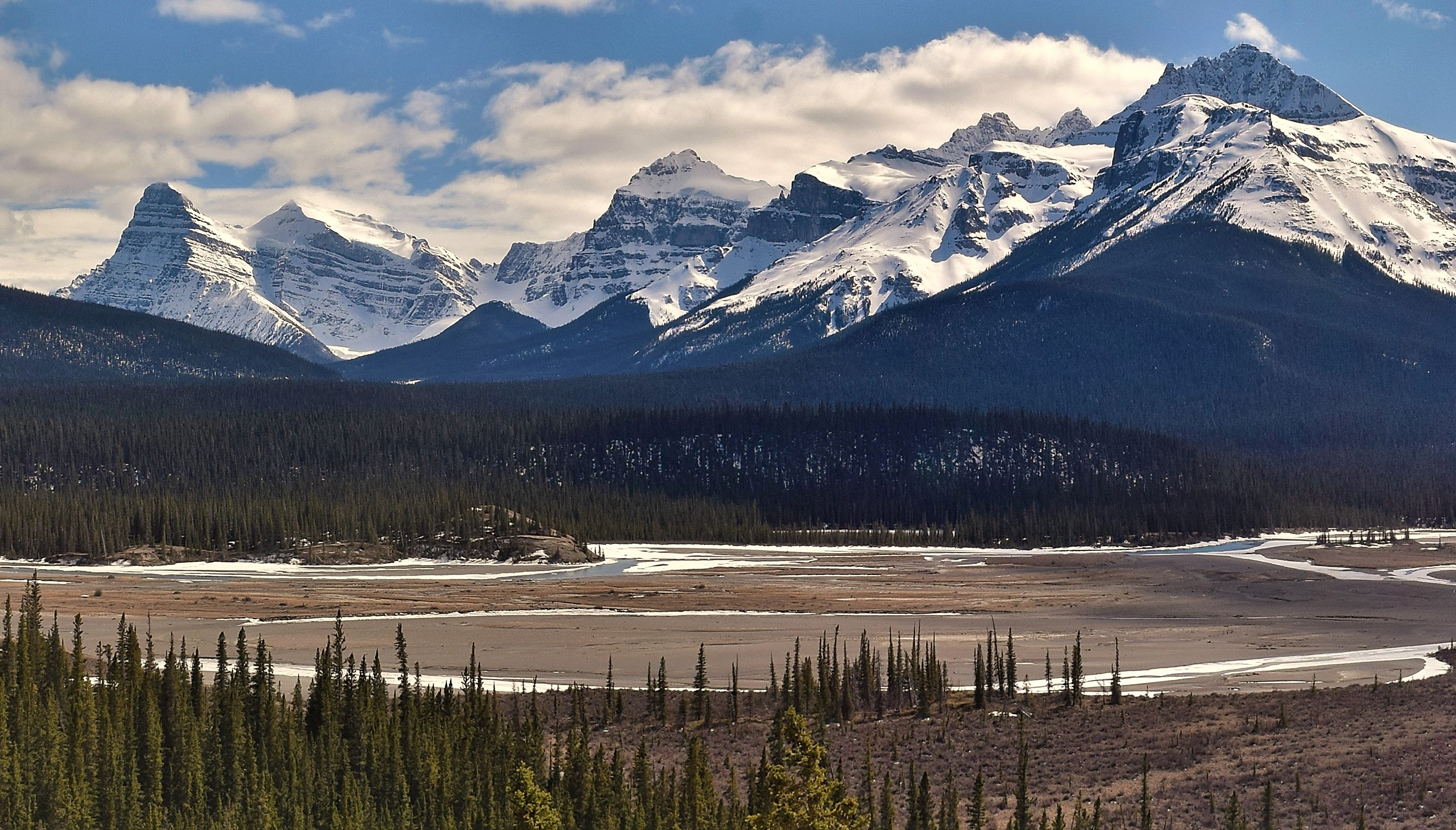
View looking south from Saskatchewan Crossing. Left to rightː Mt. Chephren, White Pyramid, Epaulette Mountain (centre), Kaufmann Peaks, Mt. Sarbach.
