= White Pyramid (Banff) =

Mountain in Banff NP, Alberta, Canada

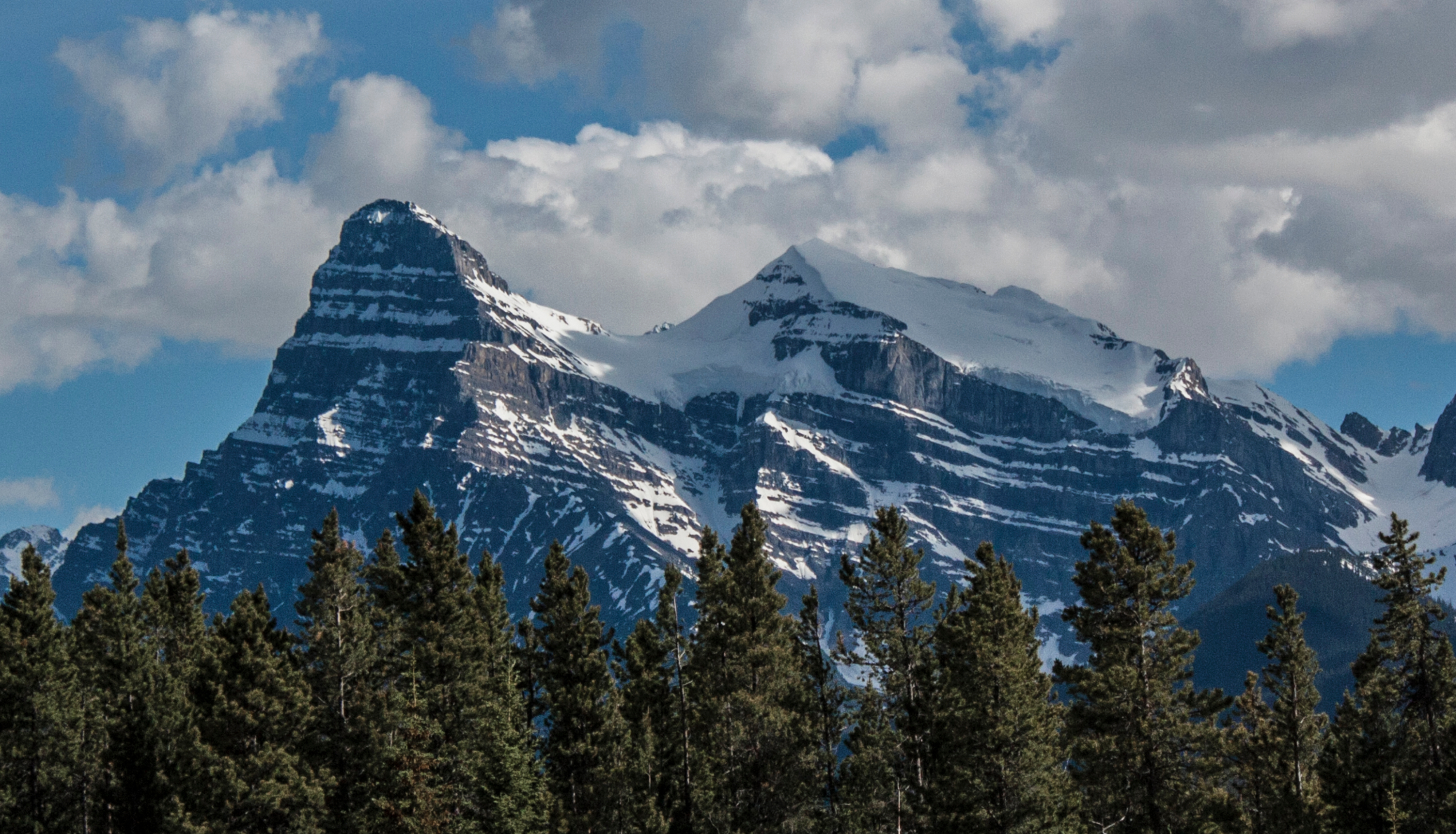
- White Pyramid (right) and Mount Chephren (left) seen from north along the Icefields Parkway

Highest point
- Elevation: 3,219 m (10,561 ft)
- Prominence: 236 m (774 ft)
- Parent peak: Howse Peak (3295 m)
- Listing: Mountains of Alberta
- Coordinates: 51°50′08″N 116°41′40″W

Geography
- Location within Alberta Location within Canada
- Interactive map of White Pyramid
- Country: Canada
- Province: Alberta
- Protected area: Banff National Park
- Parent range: Waputik Mountains; Canadian Rockies
- Topo map: NTS 82N15 Mistaya Lake

Geology
- Rock age: Cambrian
- Rock type: Sedimentary

Climbing
- First ascent: 1939 Katie Gardiner, Edward Feuz Jr. (guide)

White Pyramid is a 3,219-metre (10,561 ft) mountain summit located between the Howse River valley and Mistaya River valley of Banff National Park, in the Canadian Rockies of Alberta, Canada. Its nearest higher peak is Howse Peak, 3.00 km (1.86 mi) to the south. Topographic relief is significant as the summit rises 1,460 meters (4,790 ft) above Chephren Lake in 2.5 km (1.5 mile). White Pyramid is visible from the Icefields Parkway in the vicinity of Waterfowl Lakes.

== History ==
It was named in 1901 by J. Norman Collie to distinguish it from Mount Chephren, which back then was named Pyramid Mountain. The two peaks are nearly the same in height, and separated by only one kilometre. However, White Pyramid has a glacier on its north aspect, which Chephren does not.

The first ascent of White Pyramid was made in 1939 by Kate (Katie) Gardiner and guide Edward Feuz Jr. The climbing duo made many first ascents in the Canadian Rockies during the 1930s.

The mountain's name was made official in 1961 when approved by the Geographical Names Board of Canada.

== Geology ==
Like other mountains in Banff Park, White Pyramid is composed of sedimentary rock laid down during the Precambrian to Jurassic periods. Formed in shallow seas, this sedimentary rock was pushed east and over the top of younger rock during the Laramide orogeny.

== Climate ==
Based on the Köppen climate classification, White Pyramid is located in a subarctic climate zonewith cold, snowy winters, and mild summers. Winter temperatures can drop below -20 °C with wind chill factors below -30 °C. Precipitation runoff from White Pyramid drains into the Mistaya River and Howse River which are both tributaries of the North Saskatchewan River.

== Gallery ==
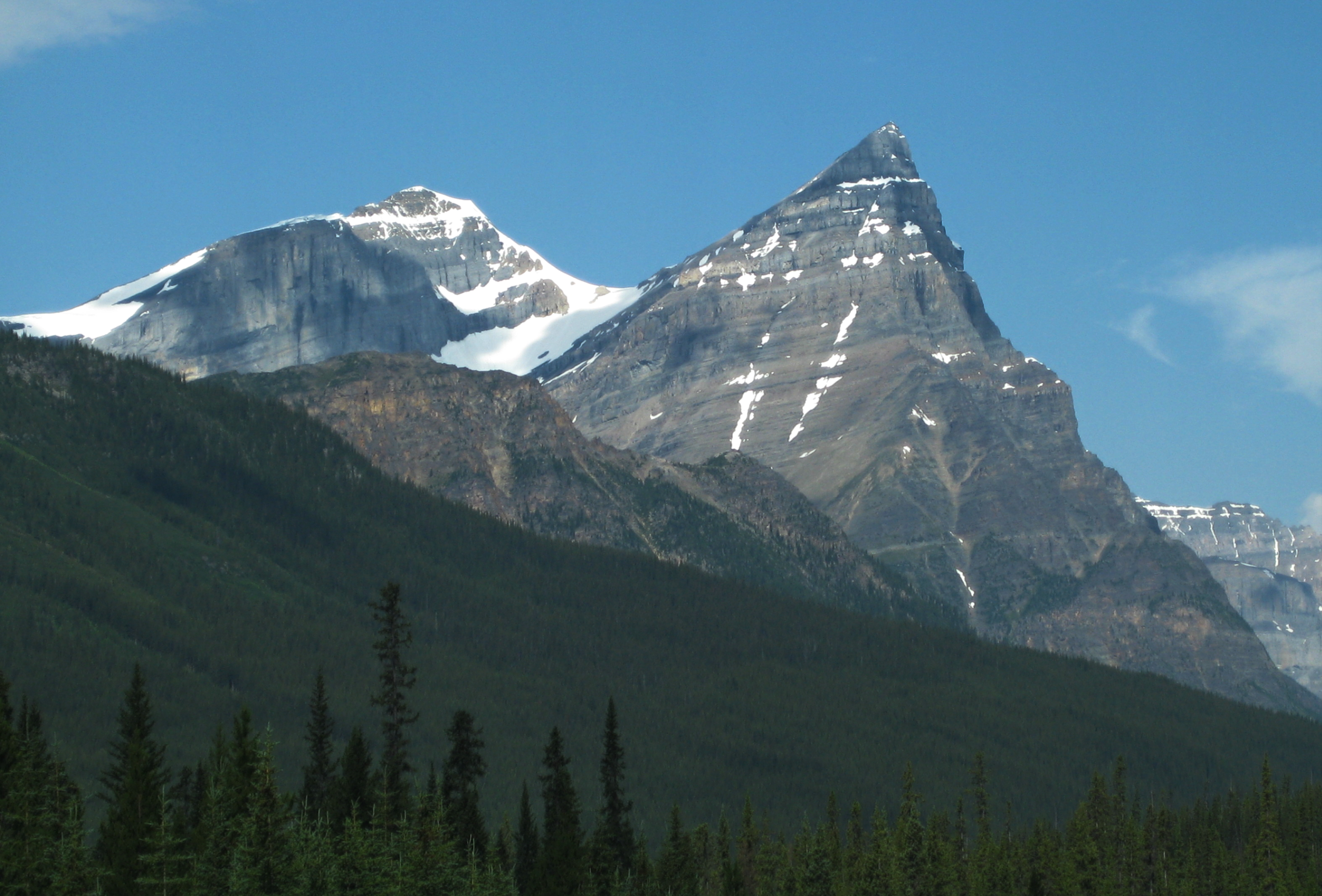
White Pyramid (left) and Mt. Chephren seen from the south along the Icefields Parkway

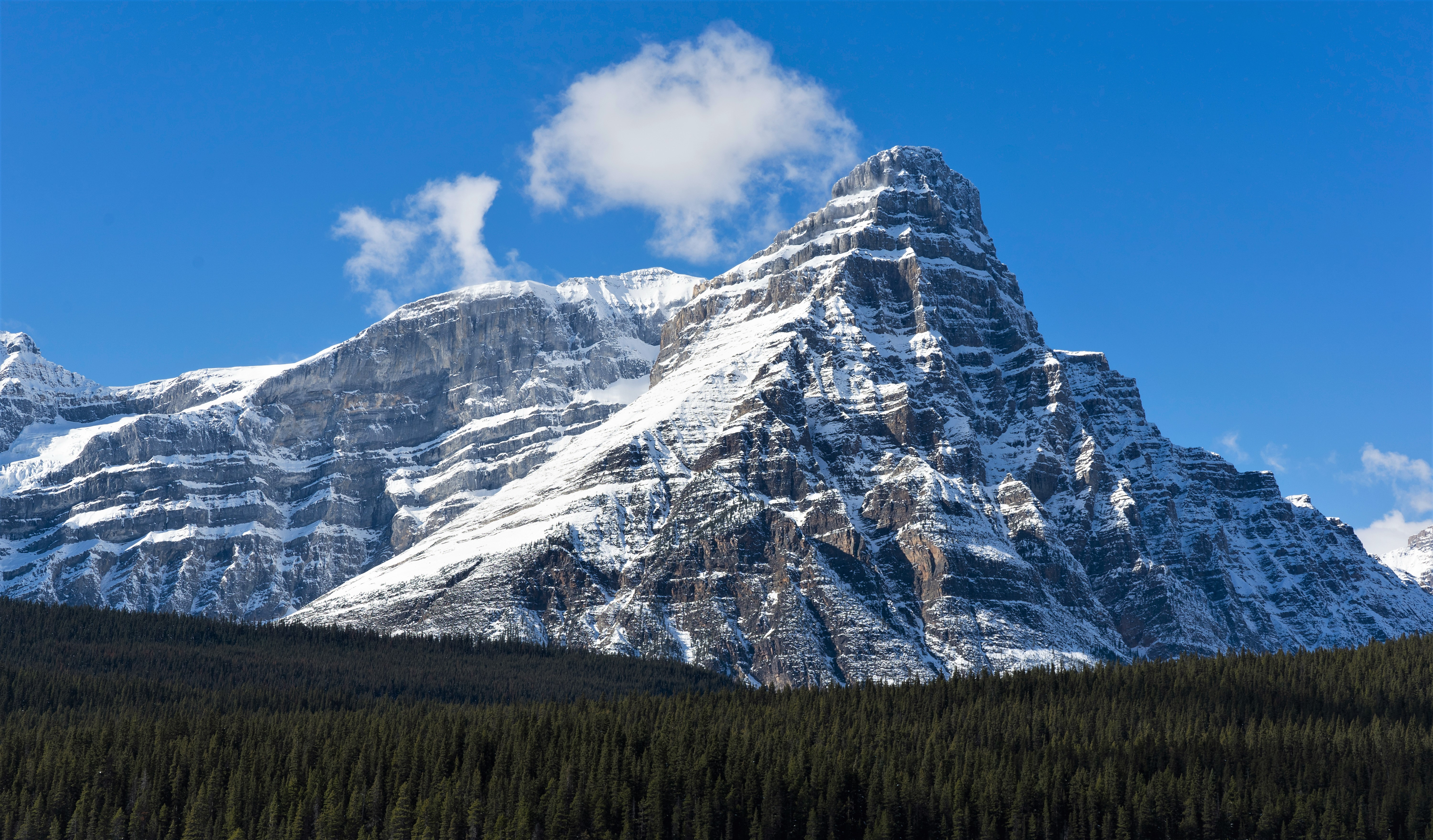
White Pyramid and Mount Chephren in winter

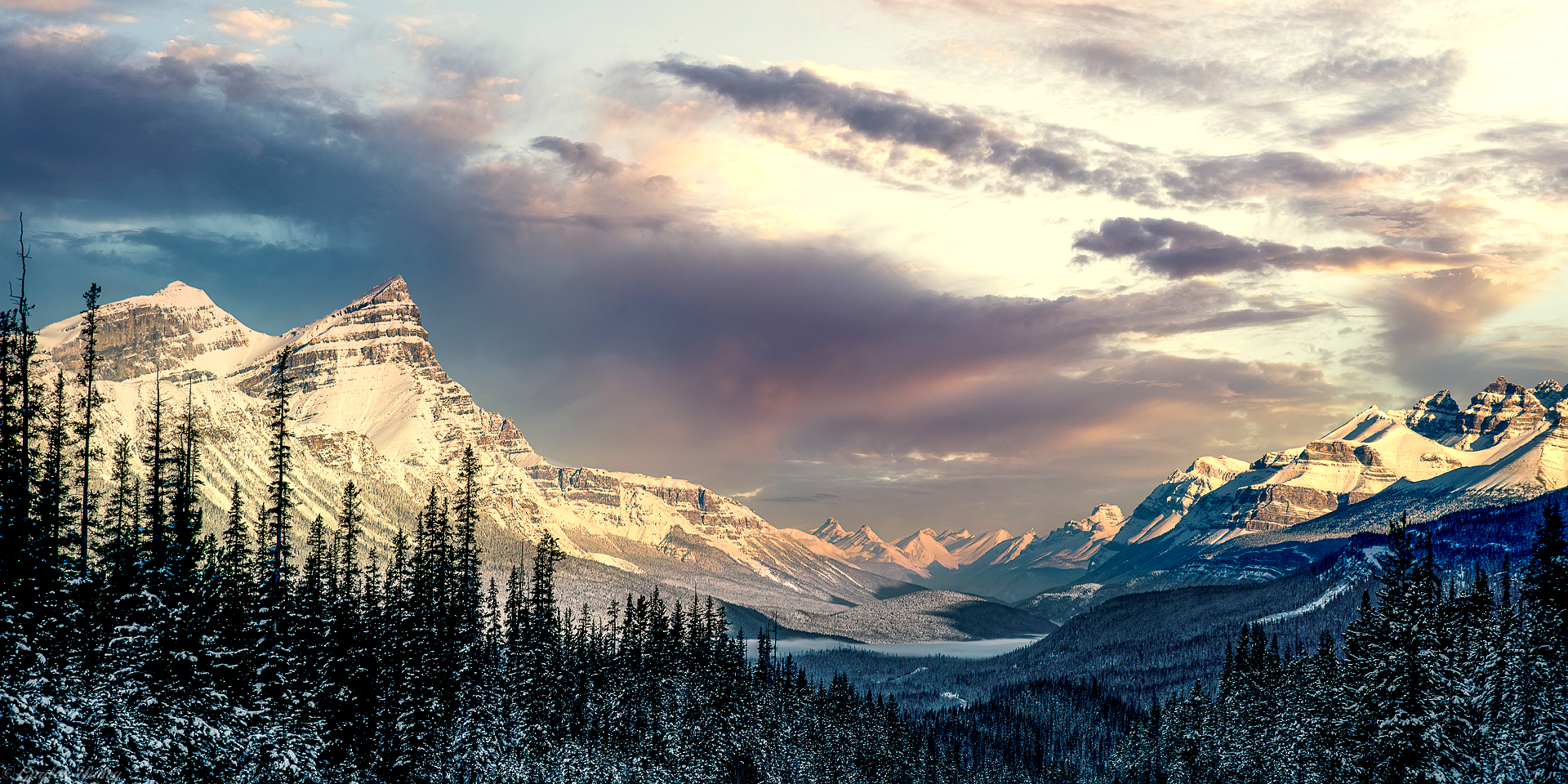
Looking north through Mistaya Valley with White Pyramid furthest left

== See also ==
- List of mountains in the Canadian Rockies
- Geography of Alberta
