= Kaufmann Peaks =

Mountain in Banff NP, Alberta, Canada

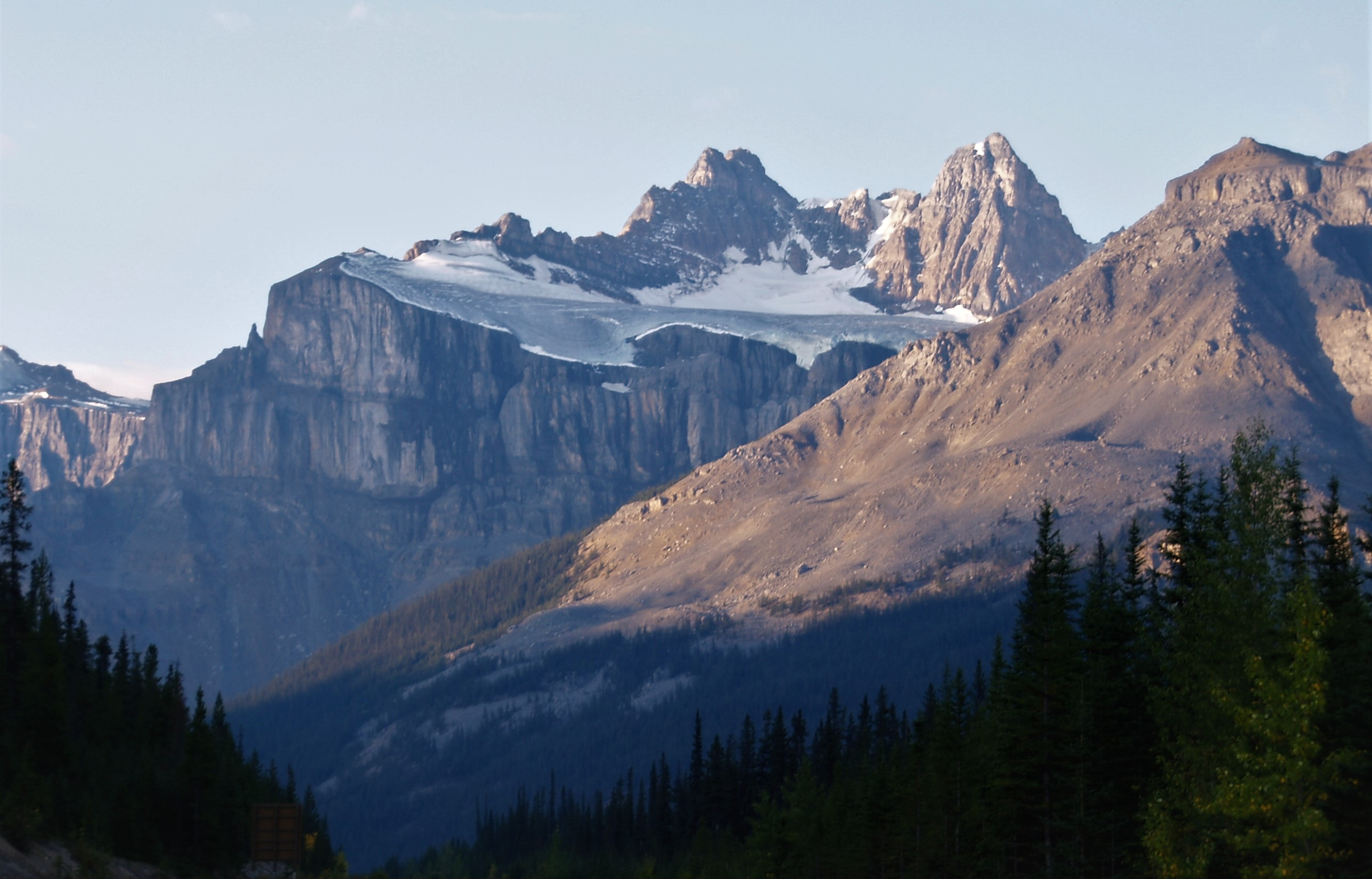
- Kaufmann Peaks seen from Icefields Parkway

Highest point
- Elevation: 3,110 m (10,200 ft)
- Prominence: 184 m (604 ft)
- Parent peak: Mount Sarbach (3,155 m)
- Listing: Mountains of Alberta
- Coordinates: 51°53′00″N 116°45′00″W

Geography
- Location within Alberta Location within Canada
- Interactive map of Kaufmann Peaks
- Country: Canada
- Province: Alberta
- Protected area: Banff National Park
- Parent range: Waputik Mountains; Canadian Rockies
- Topo map: NTS 82N15 Mistaya Lake

Geology
- Rock age: Cambrian
- Rock type: Sedimentary

Climbing
- First ascent: 1927 by D. Duncan, Ernest Feuz
- Easiest route: technical climb

Kaufmann Peaks is a 3,110 and 3,094 metre double summit mountain located on a ridge between the Howse River valley and Mistaya River valley of Banff National Park, in the Canadian Rockies of Alberta, Canada. The nearest higher neighbor is Mount Sarbach, 2.0 km (1.2 mi) to the northwest, with Epaulette Mountain immediately to the southeast. Kaufmann Peaks is situated south of Saskatchewan Crossing, where the Icefields Parkway intersects with the David Thompson Highway.

== History ==
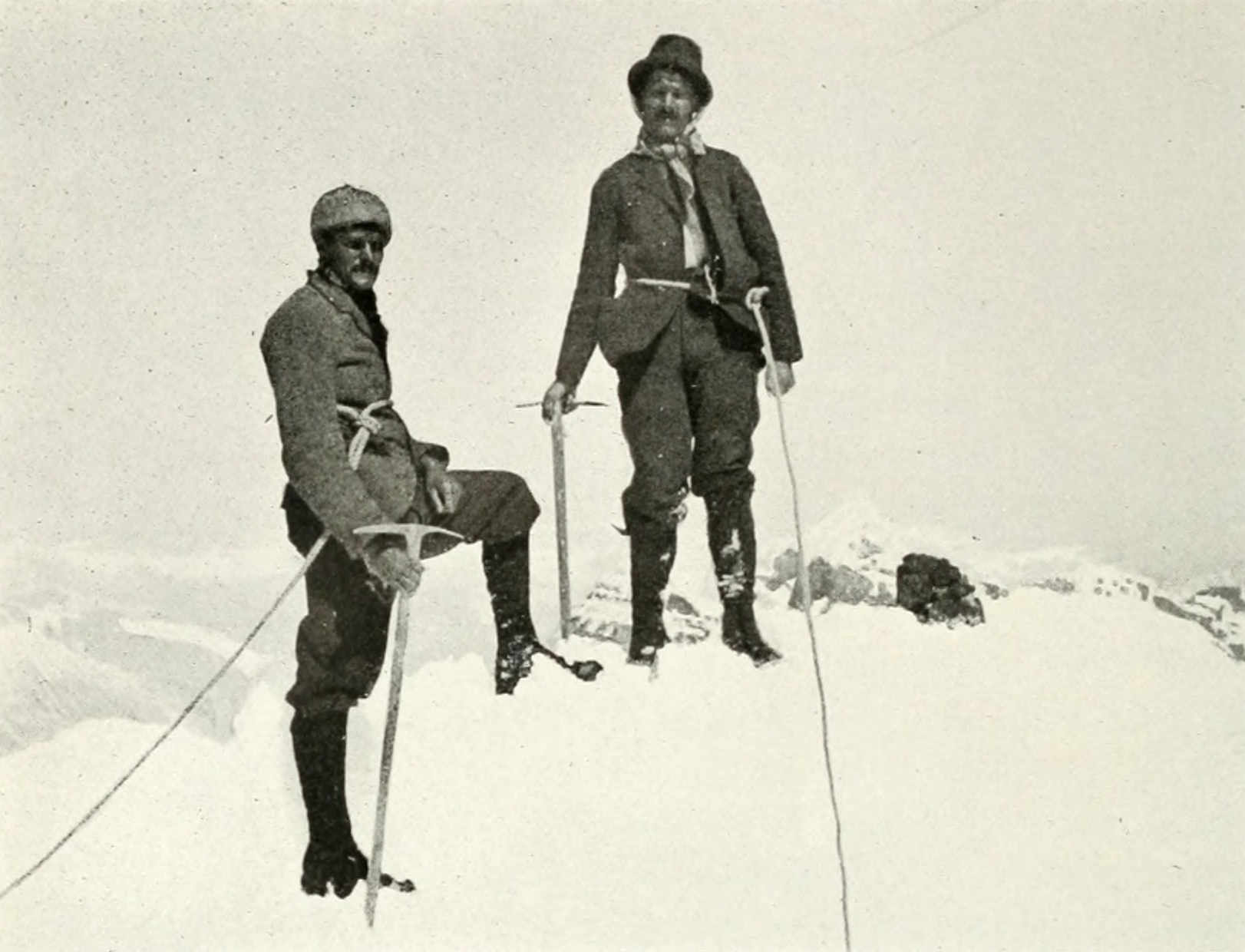
Christian and Hans

The South Peak (3,110 m) is named for Hans Kaufmann (1874–1930), the younger of two Swiss brothers who were popular mountain guides. Hans Kaufmann completed twelve first ascents in the Rockies during the years 1901 to 1904. The North Peak (3,094 m) honors Christian Kaufmann (1872–1939) who completed 36 first ascents in the Canadian Rockies by making fifteen of those in 1901 and ten more in 1902. The two were half-brothers to Peter Kaufmann. The first ascent of Kaufmann Peaks was made in 1927 by D. Duncan and guide Ernest Feuz. Recommended by James Outram in 1903, the mountain's toponym was officially adopted in 1920 by the Geographical Names Board of Canada.

== Geology ==
Like other mountains in Banff Park, Kaufmann Peaks is composed of sedimentary rock laid down during the Precambrian to Jurassic periods. Formed in shallow seas, this sedimentary rock was pushed east and over the top of younger rock during the Laramide orogeny. A glacier shared with Mount Sarbach resides in the northeast cirque.

== Climate ==
Based on the Köppen climate classification, Kaufmann Peaks is located in a subarctic climate with cold, snowy winters, and mild summers. Winter temperatures can drop below -20 °C with wind chill factors below -30 °C. Precipitation runoff from Kaufmann Peaks drains into the Mistaya River and Howse River which are both tributaries of the North Saskatchewan River.

== Gallery ==
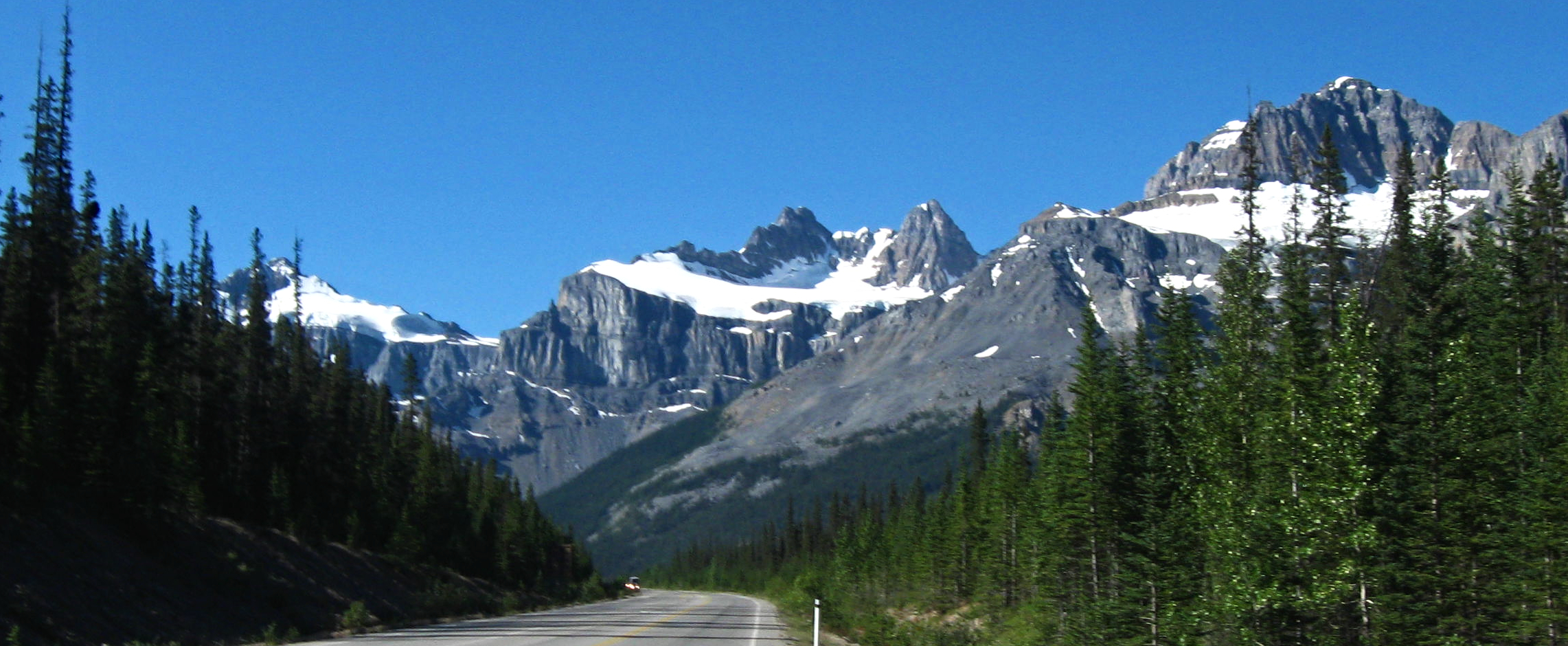
Kaufmann Peaks (centered) seen from the Icefields Parkway with Mount Sarbach (right)

== See also ==
- List of mountains of Canada
