= Midway Peak =

Mountain in the country of Canada

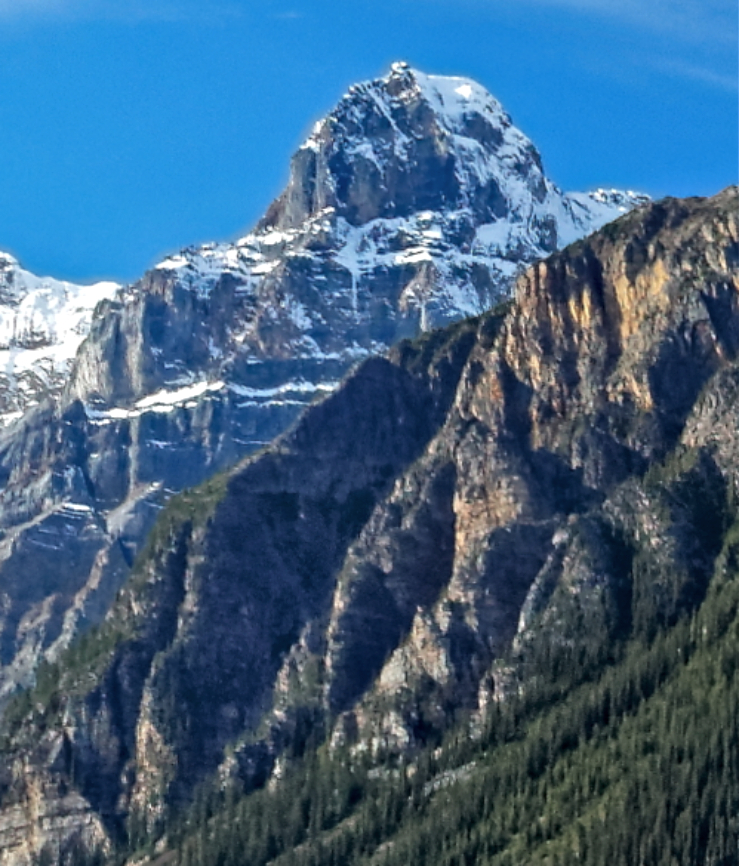
- Midway Peak

Highest point
- Elevation: 2,923 m (9,590 ft)
- Prominence: 131 m (430 ft)
- Coordinates: 51°48′05″N 116°39′20″W

Geography
- Location within Alberta Location within British Columbia Location within Canada
- Location: Alberta/British Columbia, Canada
- Parent range: Waputik Mountains; Canadian Rockies
- Topo map: NTS 82N15 Mistaya Lake

Climbing
- First ascent: 1952 Mr. and Mrs. J.D. Mendenhall

Midway Peak is a 2,923 metres (9,590 ft) mountain summit located on the Continental Divide, on the shared border of Alberta and British Columbia in the Canadian Rockies. It is also on the shared border between Banff National Park and Yoho National Park and can be seen from the Icefields Parkway. It was named in 1918 by Arthur O. Wheeler.

== Geology ==
Midway Peak is composed of sedimentary rock laid down during the Precambrian to Jurassic periods. Formed in shallow seas, this sedimentary rock was pushed east and over the top of younger rock during the Laramide orogeny.

== Climate ==
Based on the Köppen climate classification, Midway Peak is located in a subarctic climate with cold, snowy winters, and mild summers. Temperatures can drop below −20 °C with wind chill factors below −30 °C. Precipitation runoff from the peak drains east to the Mistaya River, or west into tributaries of the Blaeberry River.

== See also ==
- List of peaks on the Alberta–British Columbia border
- Mountains of Alberta
- Mountains of British Columbia
