= Mount Sarbach =

Mountain in Banff National Park, Alberta, Canada

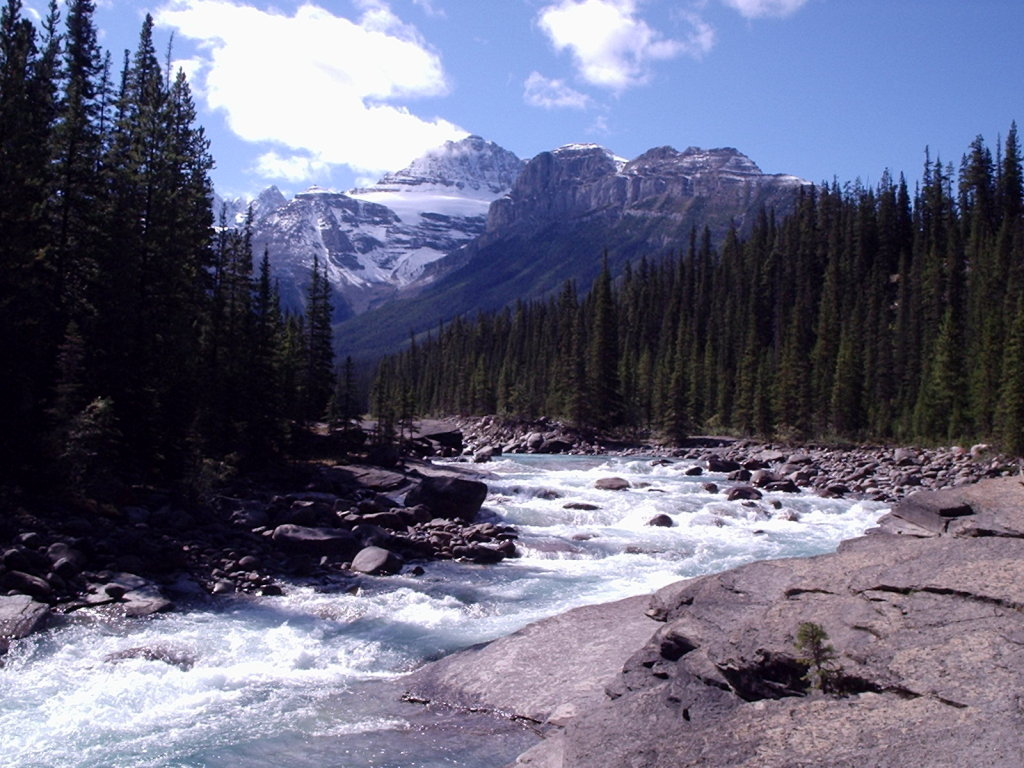
- Mount Sarbach seen from Mistaya Canyon

Highest point
- Elevation: 3,155 m (10,351 ft)
- Prominence: 412 m (1,352 ft)
- Parent peak: Mount Chephren (3274 m)
- Listing: Mountains of Alberta
- Coordinates: 51°53′34″N 116°46′05″W

Geography
- Location within Alberta Location within Canada
- Location: Alberta, Canada
- Parent range: Waputik Mountains; Canadian Rockies
- Topo map: NTS 82N15 Mistaya Lake

Geology
- Rock age: Cambrian
- Rock type: Sedimentary

Climbing
- First ascent: 1897 by J. Norman Collie, G.P. Baker and Peter Sarbach
- Easiest route: Difficult Scramble

Mount Sarbach is a mountain located in Banff National Park between Mistaya River and Howse River and is visible from the Icefields Parkway. The mountain is named after Peter Sarbach, a mountain guide from Switzerland, who guided the first ascent by J. Norman Collie and G.P. Baker in 1897. Mount Sarbach is situated south of Saskatchewan River Crossing, where the Icefields Parkway intersects with the David Thompson Highway.

== Geology ==
Like other mountains in Banff Park, Mount Sarbach is composed of sedimentary rock laid down during the Precambrian to Jurassic periods. Formed in shallow seas, this sedimentary rock was pushed east and over the top of younger rock during the Laramide orogeny. A glacier shared with Kaufmann Peaks resides in the southeast cirque.

== Climate ==
Based on the Köppen climate classification, Mount Sarbach is located in a subarctic climate with cold, snowy winters, and mild summers. Temperatures can drop below -20 °C with wind chill factors below -30 °C. Precipitation runoff from Mount Sarbach drains into the Mistaya River and Howse River which are both tributaries of the North Saskatchewan River.

== See also ==
- List of mountains of Canada
