= Aiguille Peak =

Mountain in Western Canada

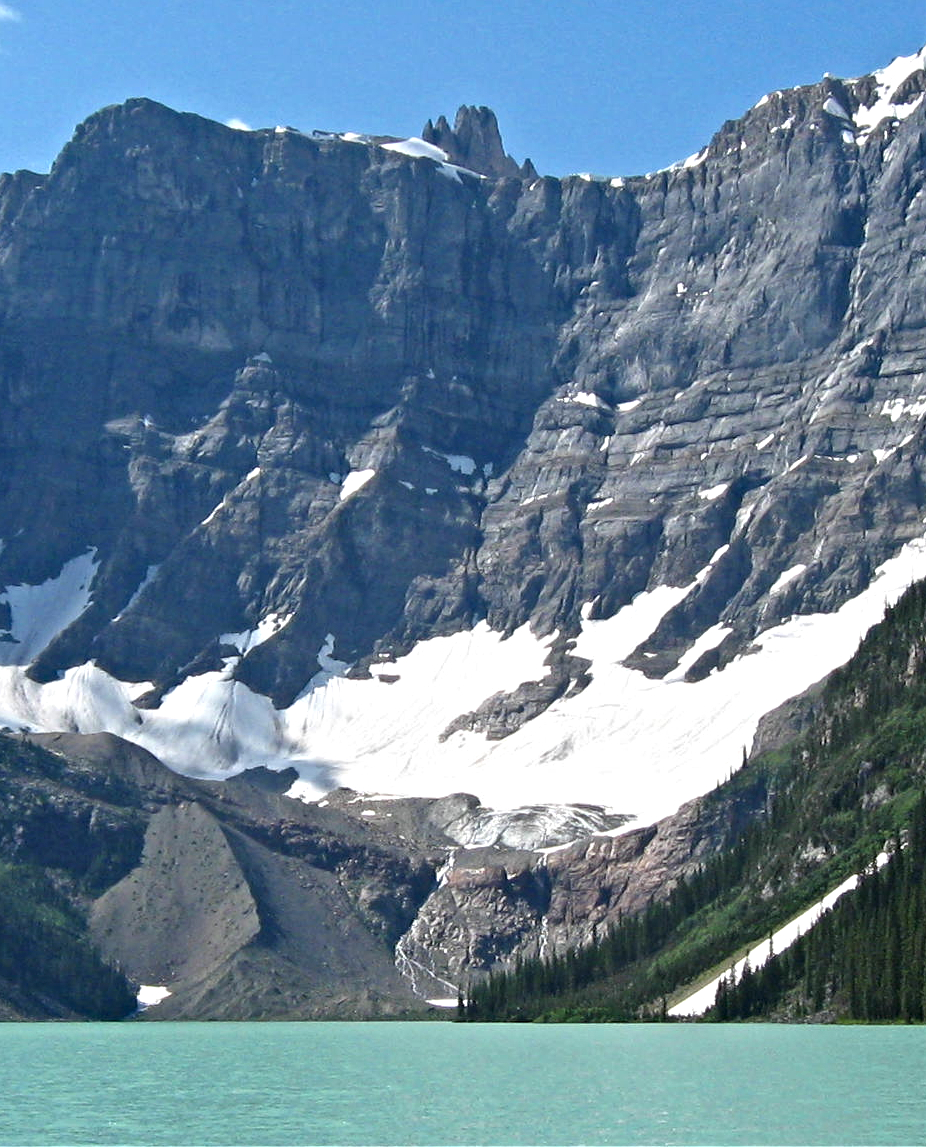
- Aiguille Peak from Chephren Lake

Highest point
- Elevation: 2,999 m (9,839 ft)
- Prominence: 206 m (676 ft)
- Parent peak: Howse Peak (3295 m)
- Listing: Mountains of Alberta; Mountains of British Columbia
- Coordinates: 51°48′16″N 116°40′11″W

Geography
- Location within Alberta Location within British Columbia Location within Canada
- Country: Canada
- Provinces: Alberta and British Columbia
- Protected area: Banff National Park
- Parent range: Waputik Range
- Topo map: NTS 82N15 Mistaya Lake

Climbing
- First ascent: 1952 by Mr. and Mrs. J.D. Mendenhall

Aiguille Peak is a peak located on the Canadian provincial boundary of Alberta and British Columbia in Banff National Park. It was named in 1915 by Arthur O. Wheeler. "Aiguille" is French for "needle" and is also a mountaineering term for a sharp-ridged summit.

== Geology ==
Aiguille Peak is composed of sedimentary rock laid down during the Precambrian to Jurassic periods. Formed in shallow seas, this sedimentary rock was pushed east and over the top of younger rock during the Laramide orogeny.

== Climate ==
Based on the Köppen climate classification, Aiguille Peak is located in a subarctic climate zone with cold, snowy winters, and mild summers. Temperatures can drop below −20 °C with wind chill factors below −30 °C. Precipitation runoff from the peak drains east to the Mistaya River, or west into tributaries of the Blaeberry River.

== See also ==
- List of peaks on the British Columbia–Alberta border
