= Mount Synge =

Mountain in Alberta and British Columbia, Canada

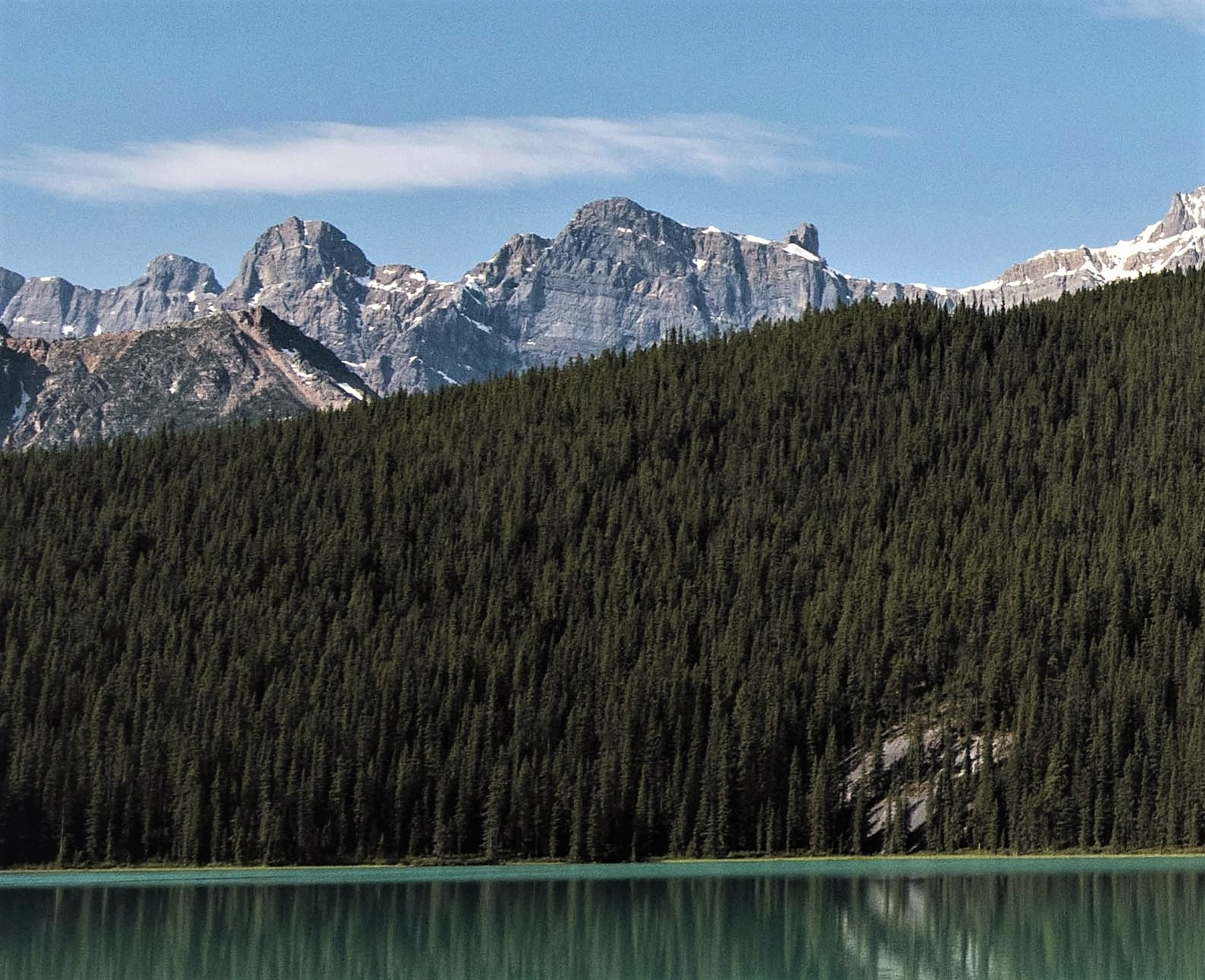
- Mt. Synge (center) from NNE

Highest point
- Elevation: 2,972 m (9,751 ft)
- Prominence: 47 m (154 ft)
- Parent peak: Aiguille Peak (2,999 m)
- Listing: Mountains of Alberta; Mountains of British Columbia
- Coordinates: 51°48′20″N 116°39′44″W

Geography
- Location within Alberta Location within British Columbia Location within Canada
- Country: Canada
- Provinces: Alberta and British Columbia
- District: Kootenay Land District
- Protected area: Banff National Park
- Parent range: Waputik Mountains
- Topo map: NTS 82N15 Mistaya Lake

Climbing
- First ascent: 1952 Mr. and Mrs. J.D. Mendenhall

Mount Synge is located NE of the head of the Blaeberry River and straddles the Continental Divide marking the Alberta-British Columbia border in the Canadian Rockies. It was named in 1918 after Captain Millington Henry Synge (1823–1907), British Army officer and author.

== Climate ==
Based on the Köppen climate classification, Mt. Synge is located in a subarctic climate zone with cold, snowy winters, and mild summers. Winter temperatures can drop below −20 °C (−4 °F) with wind chill factors below −30 °C (−22 °F).

== Geology ==
Like other mountains in Banff Park, Mount Synge is composed of sedimentary rock laid down from the Precambrian to Jurassic periods. Formed in shallow seas, this sedimentary rock was pushed east and over the top of younger rock during the Laramide orogeny.

== See also ==
- List of peaks on the Alberta–British Columbia border
