= Ayesha Peak =

Mountain peak in British Columbia, Canada

- Location within British Columbia

Highest point
- Elevation: 3,065 m (10,056 ft)
- Prominence: 287 m (942 ft)
- Parent peak: Mount Collie (3143 m)
- Listing: Mountains of British Columbia
- Coordinates: 51°38′22″N 116°36′19″W

Geography
- Country: Canada
- Province: British Columbia
- Parent range: Waputik Mountains
- Topo map: NTS 82N10 Blaeberry River

Climbing
- First ascent: 1930 by O.E. Cromwell, J. Monroe. Thorington, P. Kaufmann

Ayesha Peak is a 3,065-metre (10,056-foot) mountain summit located NE of the headwaters of the Amiskwi River, just west of Yoho National Park, in the Canadian Rockies of British Columbia, Canada.

== See also ==
- List of mountains in the Canadian Rockies
- Geography of British Columbia
