= Sarbach =

Sarbach is a surname. Notable people with the surname include:

- Peter Sarbach (1844–1930), Swiss mountain guide
- Ulrich Sarbach (born 1954), Swiss sports shooter

== See also ==
- Mount Sarbach, a mountain in Banff National Park, Canada
