= Waputik Mountains =

Subrange of the Park Ranges in Alberta and British Columbia, Canada

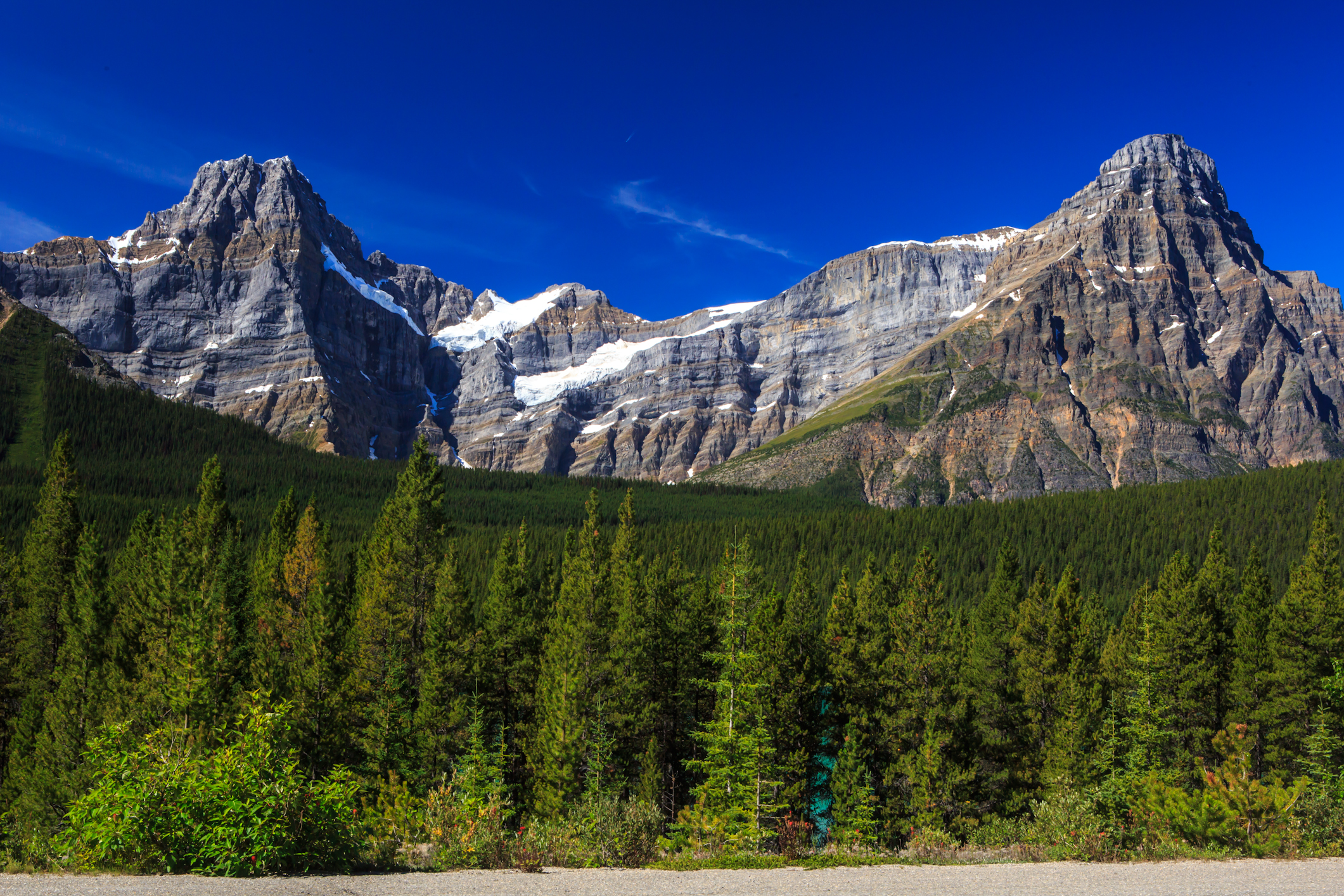
- Howse Peak and Mount Chephren

Highest point
- Peak: Howse Peak
- Elevation: 3,295 m (10,810 ft)
- Listing: Mountains of Alberta; Mountains of British Columbia
- Coordinates: 51°48′49″N 116°40′52″W

Dimensions
- Length: 61 km (38 mi) N-S
- Width: 40 km (25 mi) E-W
- Area: 1,069 km^{2} (413 mi^{2})

Geography
- Location within British Columbia Location within Alberta
- Country: Canada
- Provinces: British Columbia and Alberta
- Range coordinates: 51°35′N 116°25′W
- Parent range: Canadian Rockies
- Borders on: Conway Group
- Topo map: NTS 82N10 Blaeberry River

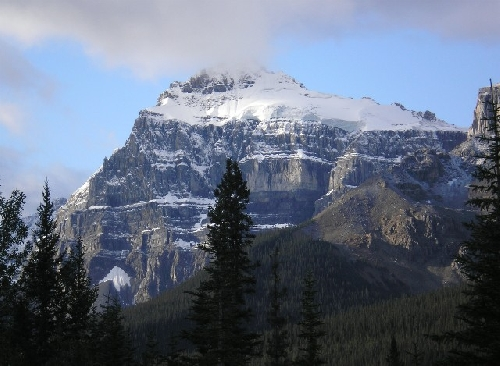
Epaulette Mountain

The Waputik Mountains are a mountain range of the Canadian Rockies, located on the Continental Divide between Banff and Yoho National Park. Covering an area of 1,069 square kilometres (413 sq mi), the range is located west of the Howse, Blaeberry and Amiskwi Rivers and east of the Bow and Mistaya Rivers and south to Kicking Horse Pass. Named in 1884 by George M. Dawson, "waputik" is the Stoney language word for white goat.

Many of the highest peaks of the range are heavily glaciated as they sit within the Waputik and Wapta Icefields. The range is further divided into the President Range and Waputik Range

== Mountains and Peaks ==
This range includes the following mountains and peaks:

Name	Elevation		Prominence		FA	Coordinates
Name	m	ft	m	ft	FA	Coordinates
Howse Peak	3,295	10,810	1,227	4,026	1902	51°48'50"N, 116°40'52"W
Mount Balfour	3,272	10,735	934	3,064	1898	51°33'56"N, 116°27'55"W
Mount Chephren	3,266	10,715	443	1,453	1913	51°50'25"N, 116°40'59"W
White Pyramid	3,219	10,561	236	774	1939	51°50'8"N, 116°41'40"W
Mount Baker	3,172	10,407	480	1,570	1923	51°39'55"N, 116°35'52"W
Mount Gordon	3,161	10,371	471	1,545	1897	51°36'22"N, 116°30'48"W
Mont des Poilus	3,161	10,371	466	1,529	1901	51°35'41"N, 116°36'24"W
Mount Sarbach	3,155	10,351	412	1,352	1897	51°53'34"N, 116°46'5"W
Mount Olive	3,130	10,270	146	479	1927	51°36'40"N, 116°29'30"W
Mount Collie	3,116	10,223	423	1,388	1901	51°37'2"N, 116°35'31"W
Kaufmann Peaks	3,110	10,200	184	604	1927	51°53'0"N, 116°45'0"W
Epaulette Mountain	3,094	10,151	259	850	1924	51°51'57"N, 116°44'6"W
Ayesha Peak	3,065	10,056	287	942	1939	51°38'22"N, 116°0'19"W
Mount Thompson	3,065	10,056	369	1,211	1898	51°39'50"N, 116°31'22"W
Mount Rhondda	3,062	10,046	102	335	1923	51°38'36"N, 116°33'40"W
Crowfoot Mountain	3,050	10,010	355	1,165	1950	51°37'30"N, 116°25'59"W
Trapper Peak	3,014	9,888	128	420	1933	51°40'38"N, 116°35'27"W
Mount Synge	2,972	9,751	47	154	1952	51°48'20"N, 116°39'44"W
Peyto Peak	2,970	9,740	220	720	1933	51°41'2"N, 116°33'56"W
St. Nicholas Peak	2,938	9,639	38	125	1930	51°37'40"N, 116°30'9"W
Mount Jimmy Simpson	2,966	9,731	251	823	1897	51°41'8"N, 116°30'17"W
Bow Peak	2,840	9,320	493	1,617		51°37'35"N, 116°22'45"W
