= Mount Jimmy Simpson =

Mountain in Canada

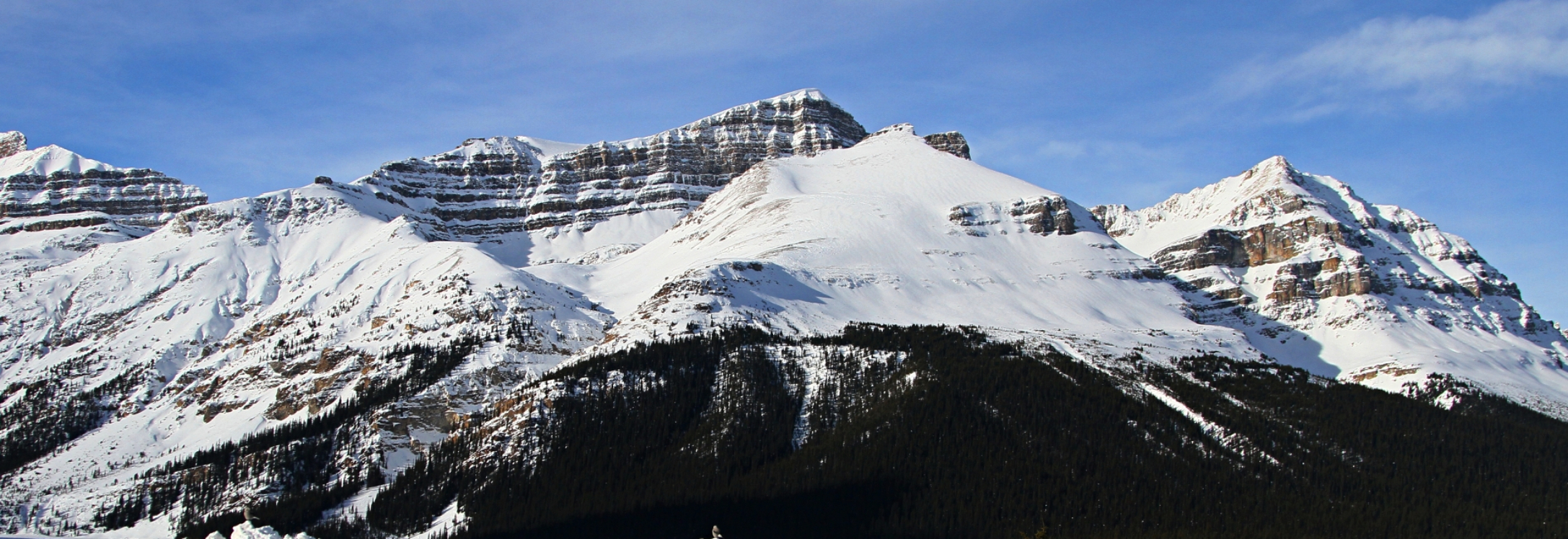
- Mt. Jimmy Simpson in winter (2013)

Highest point
- Elevation: 2,966 m (9,731 ft)
- Prominence: 251 m (823 ft)
- Parent peak: Mount Thompson (3,089 m)
- Listing: Mountains of Alberta
- Coordinates: 51°41′08″N 116°30′17″W

Geography
- Location within Alberta Location within Canada
- Interactive map of Mount Jimmy Simpson
- Location: Banff National Park; Alberta, Canada
- Parent range: Waputik Mountains; Canadian Rockies
- Topo map: NTS 82N10 Blaeberry River

Geology
- Rock age: Cambrian
- Rock type: Sedimentary

Climbing
- First ascent: 1897 by J. Norman Collie, G.P. Baker, P. Sarbach

Mount Jimmy Simpson is a 2,966-metre (9,731-foot) summit located 3 kilometres (1.9 miles) northwest of Bow Lake in Banff National Park, in the Canadian Rockies of Alberta, Canada. Its nearest higher peak is Mount Thompson, 3.0 km (1.9 mi) to the southwest. Mount Jimmy Simpson is a member of the Waputik Mountains, and is situated east of the Wapta Icefield and west of the Bow River valley. Mount Jimmy Simpson can be seen from the Icefields Parkway at Bow Lake. Jimmy Simpson Junior is a 2,721 meter sub-summit east of the mountain.

== History ==
Mount Jimmy Simpson is named for Jimmy Simpson (1877–1972) who was a respected outfitter in the early explorations of the Canadian Rockies. Jimmy worked as a cook for Tom Wilson and learned the guide and outfitting business from Bill Peyto. In 1902, while working for Peyto, he was given the responsibility of leading James Outram's climbing expedition into the headwaters of the North Saskatchewan River and Columbia Icefield. Jimmy built a small log cabin for use with his outfitting business on the north shore of Bow Lake. It was expanded in 1937, and is now the historic Num-Ti-Jah Lodge. Jimmy continued actively guiding until the end of World War II when his son, Jimmy Simpson Junior, took over the business.

The first ascent of Mount Jimmy Simpson was made in 1897 by J. Norman Collie, George Percival, and Peter Sarbach. The mountain's name was officially adopted in 1973 by the Geographical Names Board of Canada.

== Geology ==
Like other mountains in Banff Park, Mount Jimmy Simpson is composed of sedimentary rock laid down during the Precambrian to Jurassic periods. Formed in shallow seas, this sedimentary rock was pushed east and over the top of younger rock during the Laramide orogeny.

== Climate ==
Based on the Köppen climate classification, Mount Jimmy Simpson is located in a subarctic climate with cold, snowy winters, and mild summers. Winter temperatures can drop below −20 °C with wind chill factors below −30 °C. Precipitation runoff from Mount Jimmy Simpson drains into the Bow River which is a tributary of the Saskatchewan River.

== Gallery ==
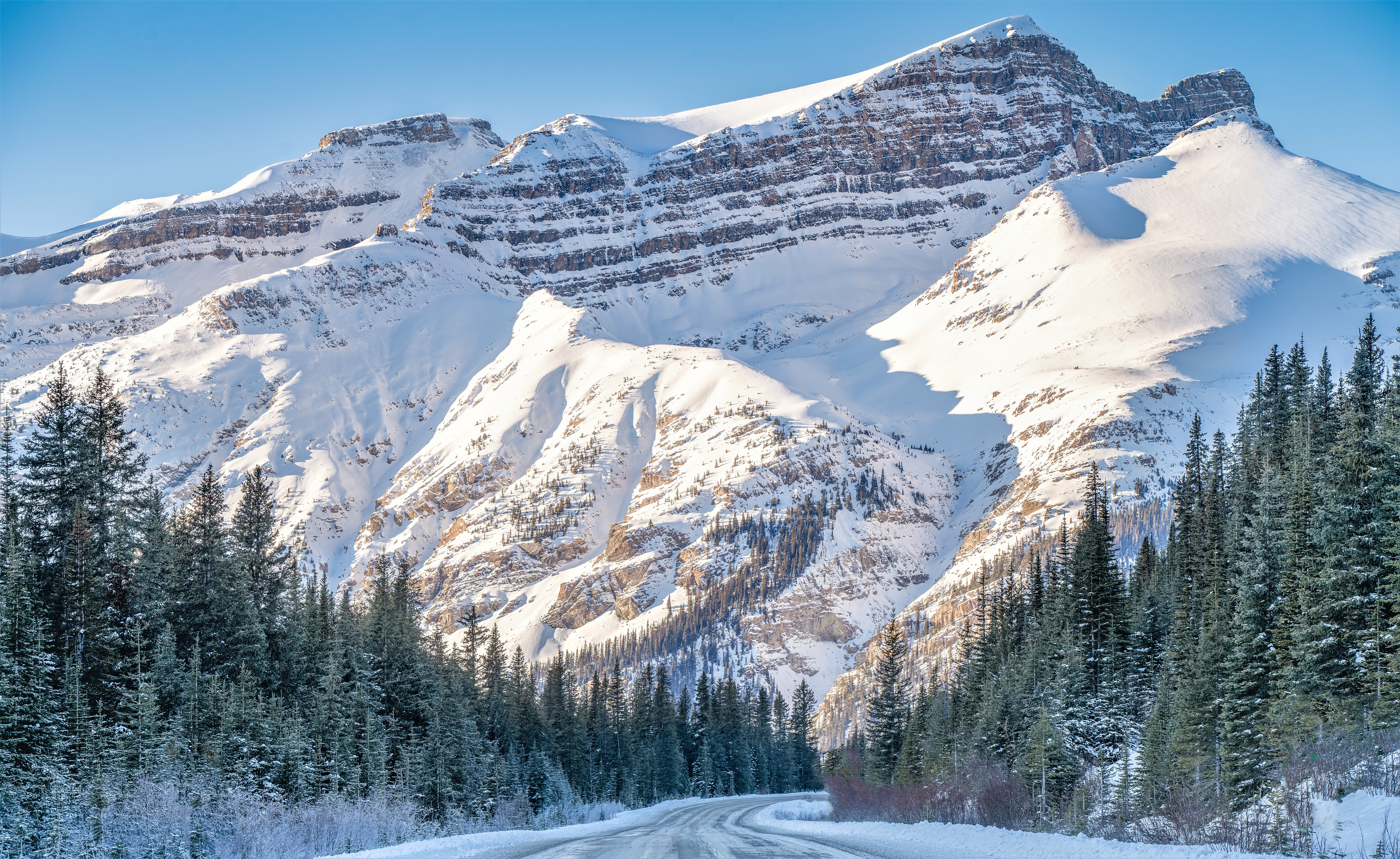
Mt. Jimmy Simpson seen from Icefields Parkway in winter

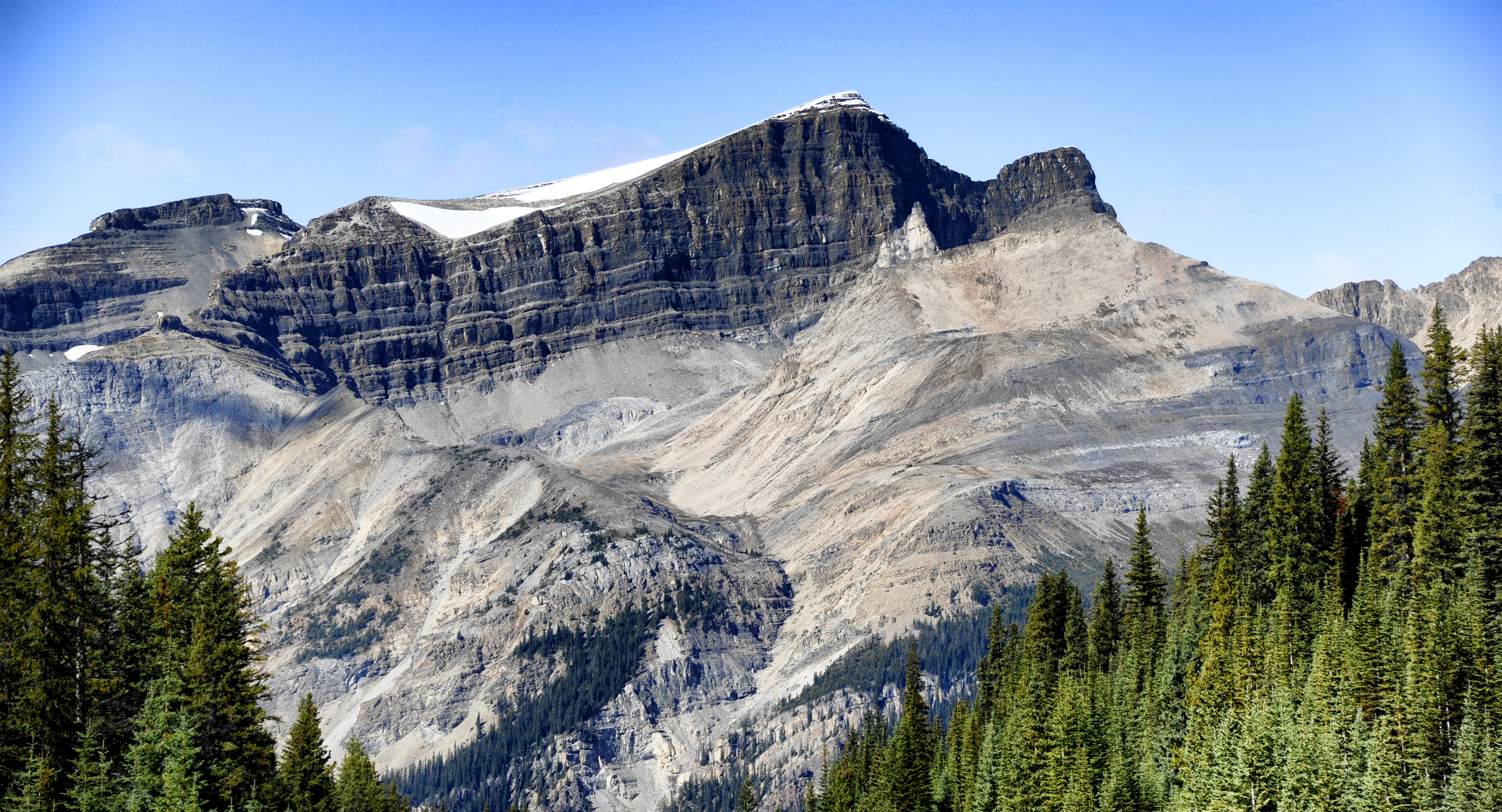
Mt. Jimmy Simpson seen from Icefields Parkway

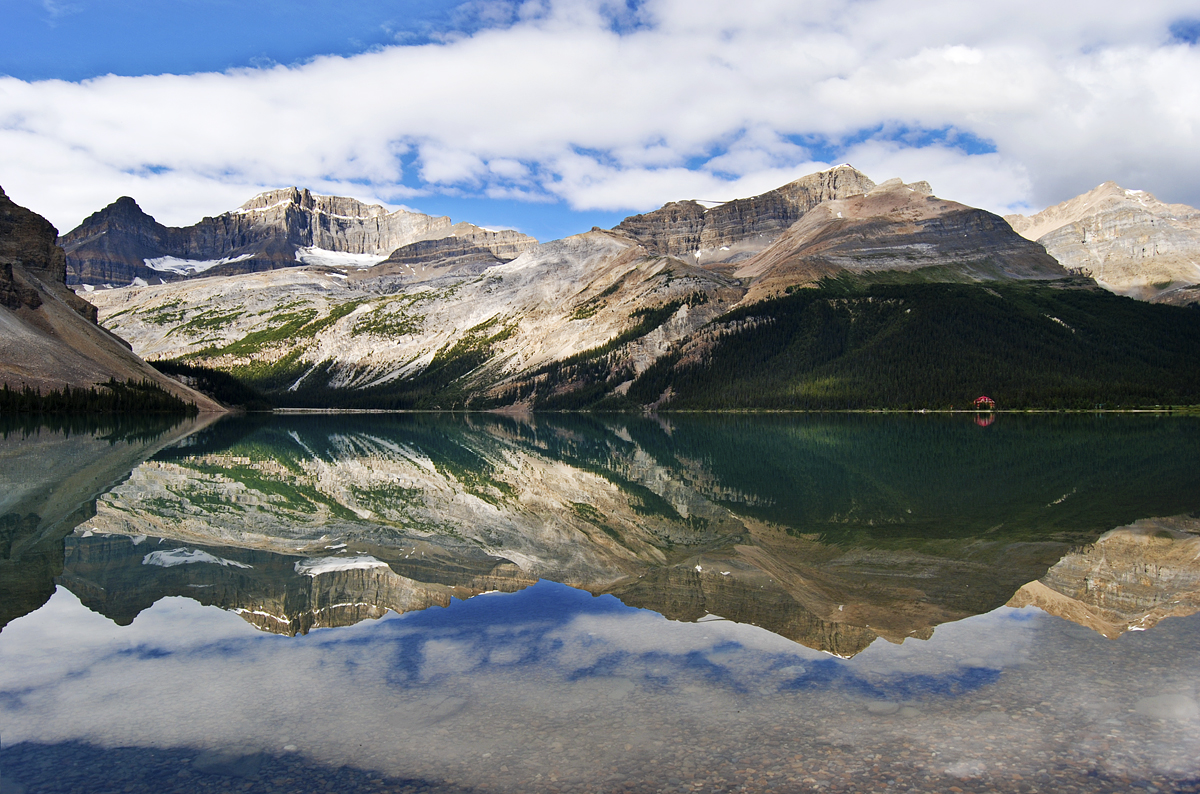
Bow Lake with Thompson and Jimmy Simpson

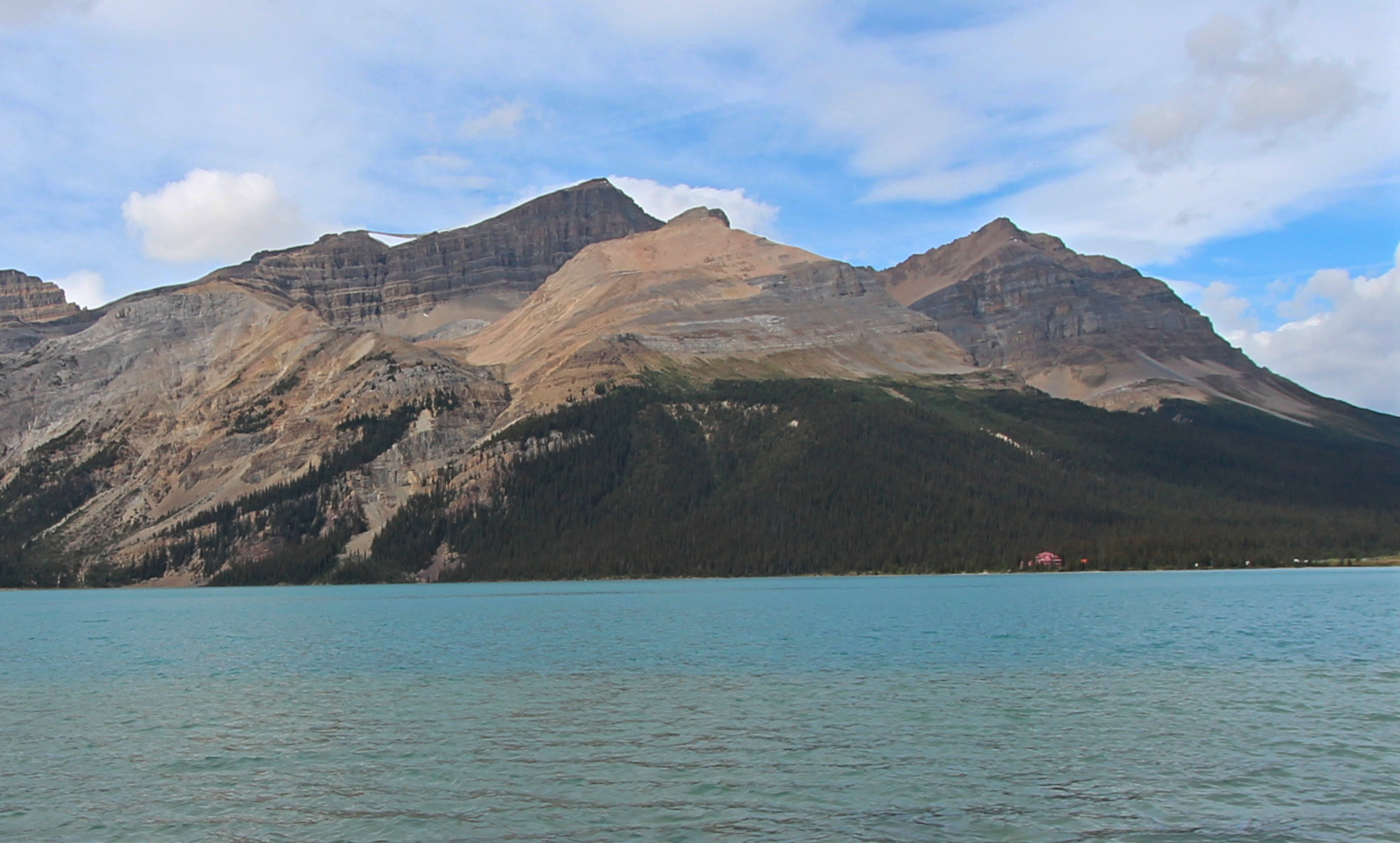
Mount Jimmy Simpson seen from Icefields Parkway at Bow Lake.

== See also ==
- List of mountains of Canada
- Geology of Alberta
