= Mistaya Canyon =

Valley in Alberta, Canada

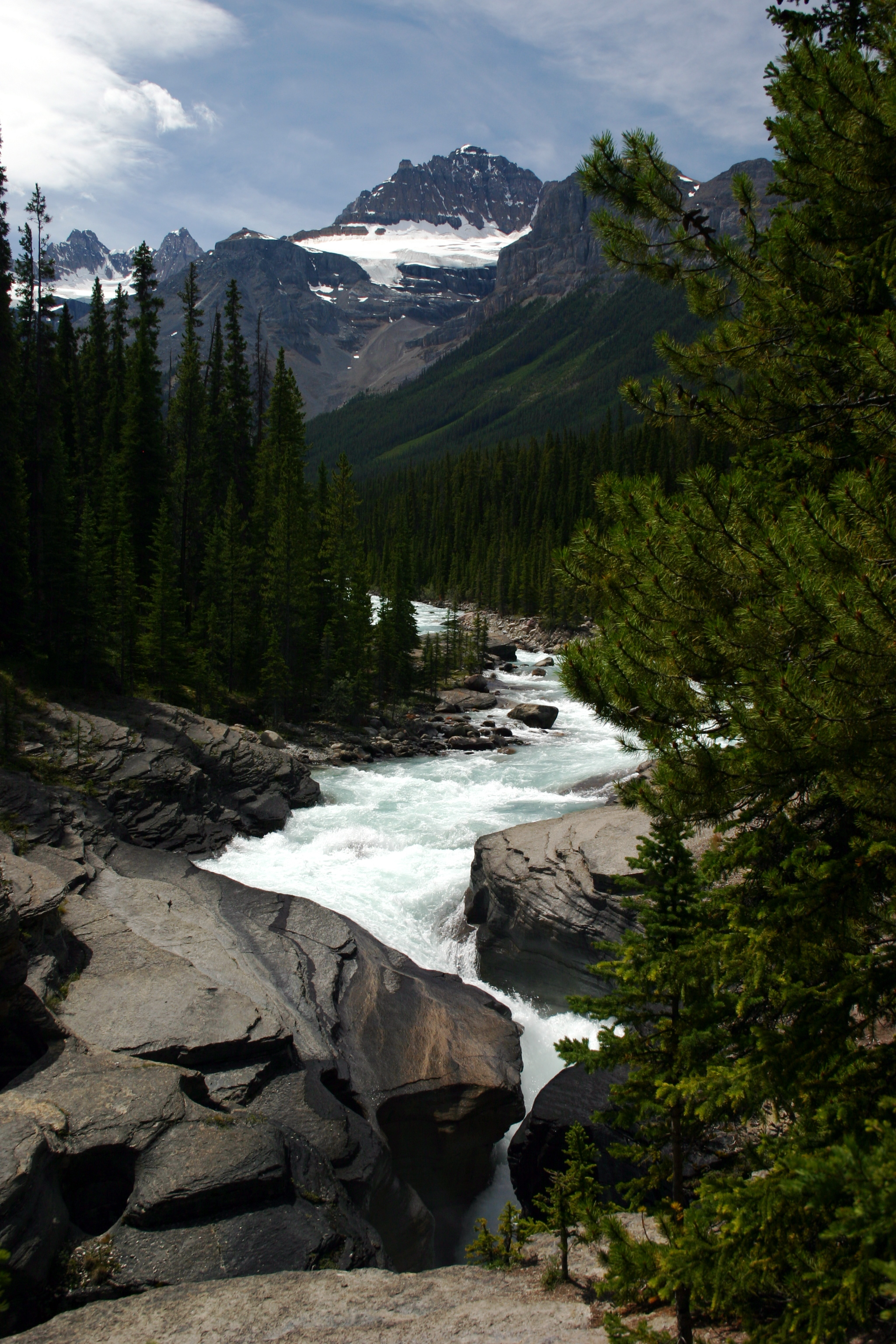
- Mistaya Canyon with a peak in the background

Geography
- Location: Banff National Park, Alberta, Canada
- Coordinates: 51°57′01″N 116°43′00″W
- River: Mistaya River
- Interactive map of Mistaya Canyon
- Short walking trail from Icefields Parkway parking area

Mistaya Canyon is a canyon on the Mistaya River in Banff National Park in the province of Alberta. It is located along the Icefields Parkway (Highway 93 North) near the confluence of the Mistaya and North Saskatchewan rivers. Situated in the western Alberta portion of the Canadian Rockies within Banff National Park, the canyon is known for its deep, narrow channel and is a roadside attraction accessible via a short walking trail from a nearby parking area.

== Geography ==
The surrounding landscape is mountainous and heavily influenced by past glaciation. The present canyon was cut by post-glacial river erosion, with the Mistaya River ultimately flowing into the North Saskatchewan River a short distance downstream.

== Geology ==
Mistaya Canyon is incised into Paleozoic carbonate rocks of the Western Canadian Sedimentary Basin exposed in Alberta's Rockies. The canyon occupies part of a glacially modified valley system that was subsequently re-incised by modern river flow following deglaciation.

Structural features such as fractures and bedding planes locally guide erosion, contributing to the canyon’s narrow profile, steep walls, and the formation of potholes. Canyon walls consist primarily of limestone and dolostone units that have been affected by regional deformation and diagenetic alteration associated with basin-scale fluid migration.
