= Mount Chephren =

Mountain in Alberta, Canada

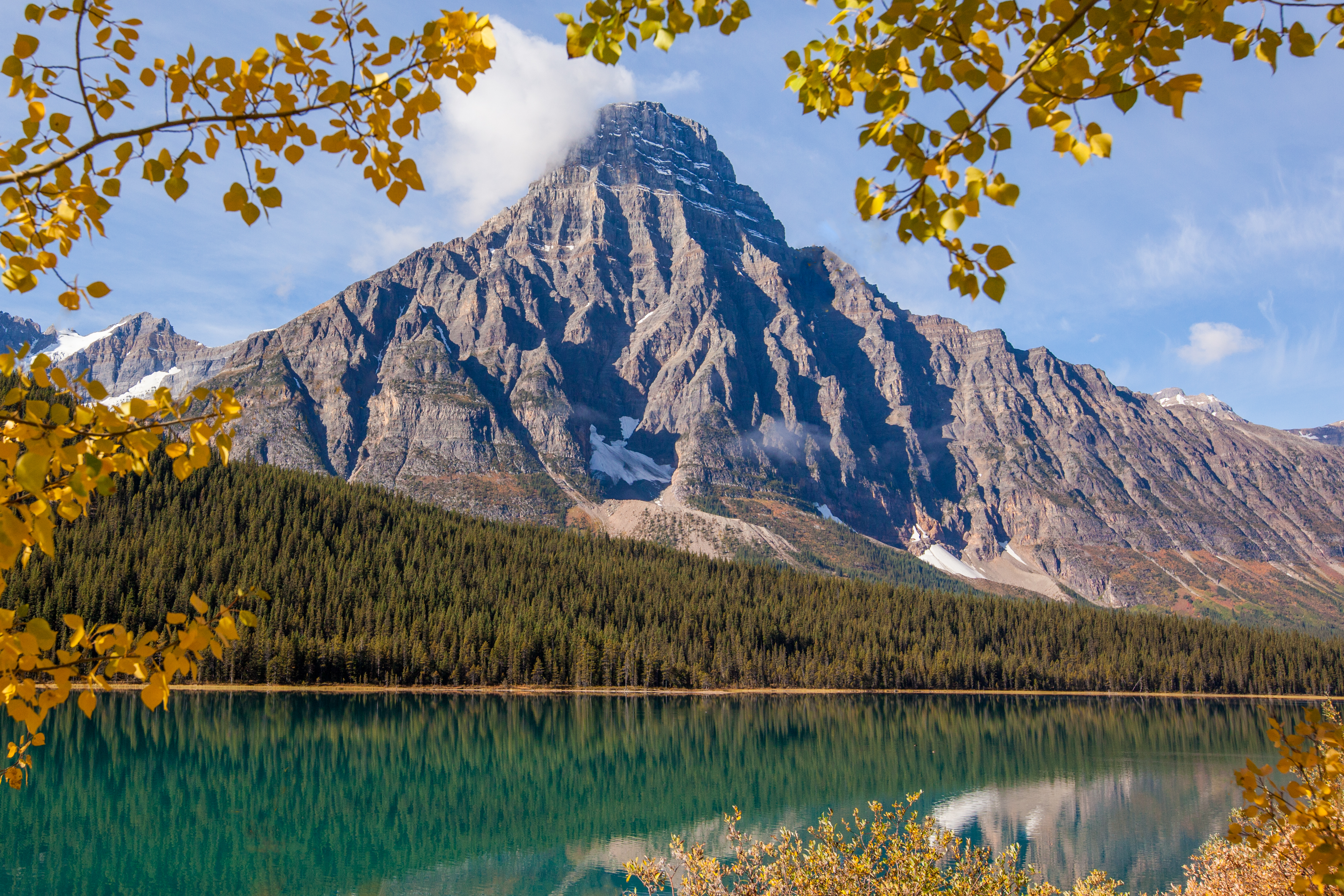
- Mount Chephren and Waterfowl Lake seen from the Icefields Parkway

Highest point
- Elevation: 3,266 m (10,715 ft) (Note: Other sources give 3307 m and 3274 m)
- Prominence: 443 m (1,453 ft) (Note: Based on a summit elevation of 3274 m)
- Parent peak: Howse Peak (3295 m)
- Listing: Mountains of Alberta
- Coordinates: 51°50′25″N 116°40′59″W

Geography
- Location within Alberta
- Interactive map of Mount Chephren
- Location: Alberta, Canada
- Parent range: Waputik Mountains
- Topo map: NTS 82N15 Mistaya Lake

Geology
- Rock type(s): Quartzite, Limestone, Dolomite

Climbing
- First ascent: 1913 by J. W. A. Hickson, guided by Edward Feuz jr.
- Easiest route: Scramble (difficult) on south face

Mount Chephren is a mountain located in the Mistaya River valley of Banff National Park, Canada.

Mount Chephren was named after Chephren, the 4th dynasty Egyptian pharaoh. The mountain was originally named Pyramid Mountain in 1897 by J. Norman Collie, but it conflicted with an identically named peak in Jasper National Park, so it was renamed in 1924 by the Geographical Names Board of Canada to its present name.

== Routes ==
=== Scramble ===
Mount Chephren is rated a difficult scramble on the south face due to its steep upper slopes with possible snow and ice difficulties. Considerable snow on the route would likely require crampons and an ice axe, thereby pushing the climb into the realm of technical mountaineering. The best conditions for scrambling would normally be late July and August.

The trail head is located at the west end of the Waterfowl Lakes campground off the Icefields Parkway in Banff National Park. The elevation gain from the trail head to the summit is 1,630 m (5,348 ft).

=== Technical ===
There are three main routes:

- South Face/West Ridge (Normal Route) II
- East Face V 5.9 A1
- The Wild Thing VI 5.9 A3 WI4

== Geology ==
Like other mountains in Banff Park, Mount Chephren is composed of sedimentary rock laid down during the Precambrian to Jurassic periods. Formed in shallow seas, this sedimentary rock was pushed east and over the top of younger rock during the Laramide orogeny.

== Climate ==
Based on the Köppen climate classification, Mount Chephren is located in a subarctic climate zone with cold, snowy winters, and mild summers. Winter temperatures can drop below −20 °C with wind chill factors below −30 °C.

== Gallery ==
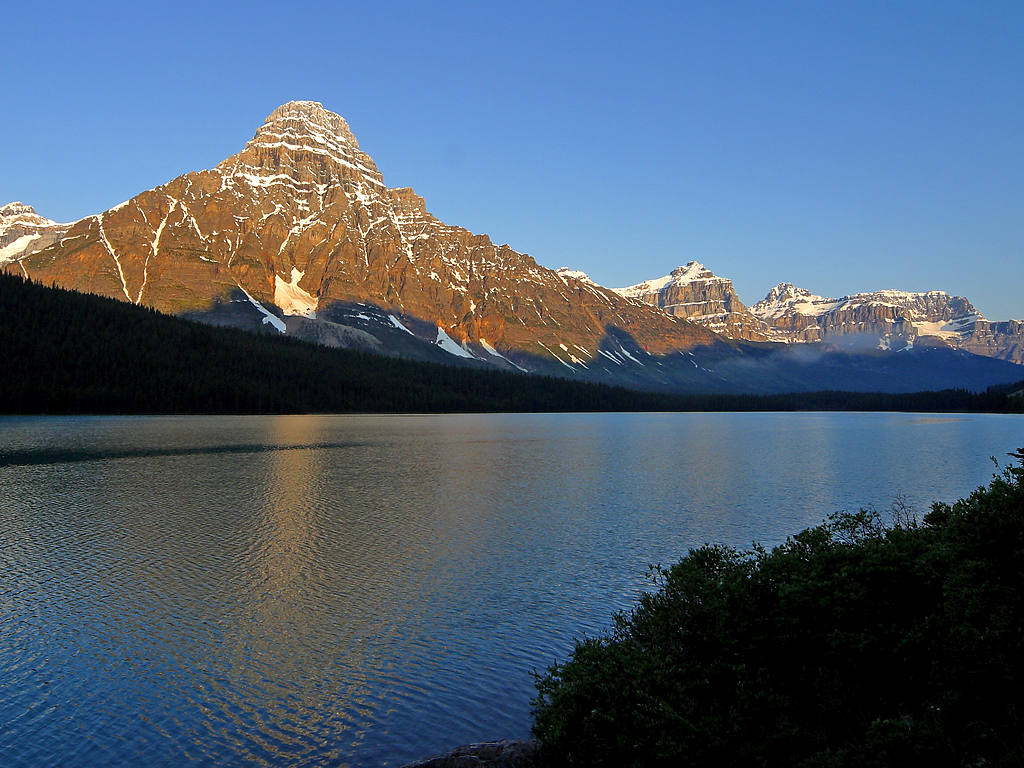
Mount Chephren and Waterfowl Lake seen from the Icefields Parkway
