= Mount Collie =

Mountain in Yoho NP, BC, Canada

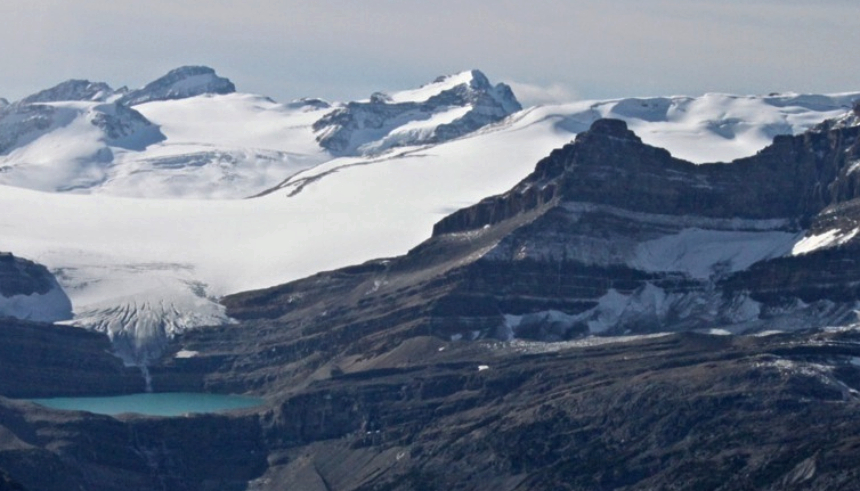
- Mount Collie centered in the distance beyond Portal Peak. (Seen from Cirque Peak)

Highest point
- Elevation: 3,143 m (10,312 ft)
- Prominence: 423 m (1,388 ft)
- Parent peak: Mont des Poilus (3166 m)
- Listing: Mountains of British Columbia
- Coordinates: 51°37′02″N 116°35′30″W

Geography
- Location within British Columbia
- Location: British Columbia, Canada
- Parent range: Waputik Mountains
- Topo map: NTS 82N10 Blaeberry River

Climbing
- First ascent: 1901 by Christian Kaufmann, Christian Klucker, and Joseph Pollinger guiding James Outram and Edward Whymper
- Easiest route: glacier/snow climb

Mount Collie is a mountain in Yoho National Park, located on the western boundary of the Wapta Icefield in Canada. The mountain was named in 1897 by Charles S. Thompson after J. Norman Collie, an accomplished mountaineer and early explorer of the Canadian Rockies.

== Geology ==
Mount Collie is composed of sedimentary rock laid down during the Precambrian to Jurassic periods. Formed in shallow seas, this sedimentary rock was pushed east and over the top of younger rock during the Laramide orogeny.

== Climate ==
Based on the Köppen climate classification, Mount Collie is located in a subarctic climate with cold, snowy winters, and mild summers. Temperatures can drop below −20 °C with wind chill factors below −30 °C.

== See also ==
- Geography of British Columbia
