= Howse Peak =

Mountain in Alberta and British Columbia, Canada

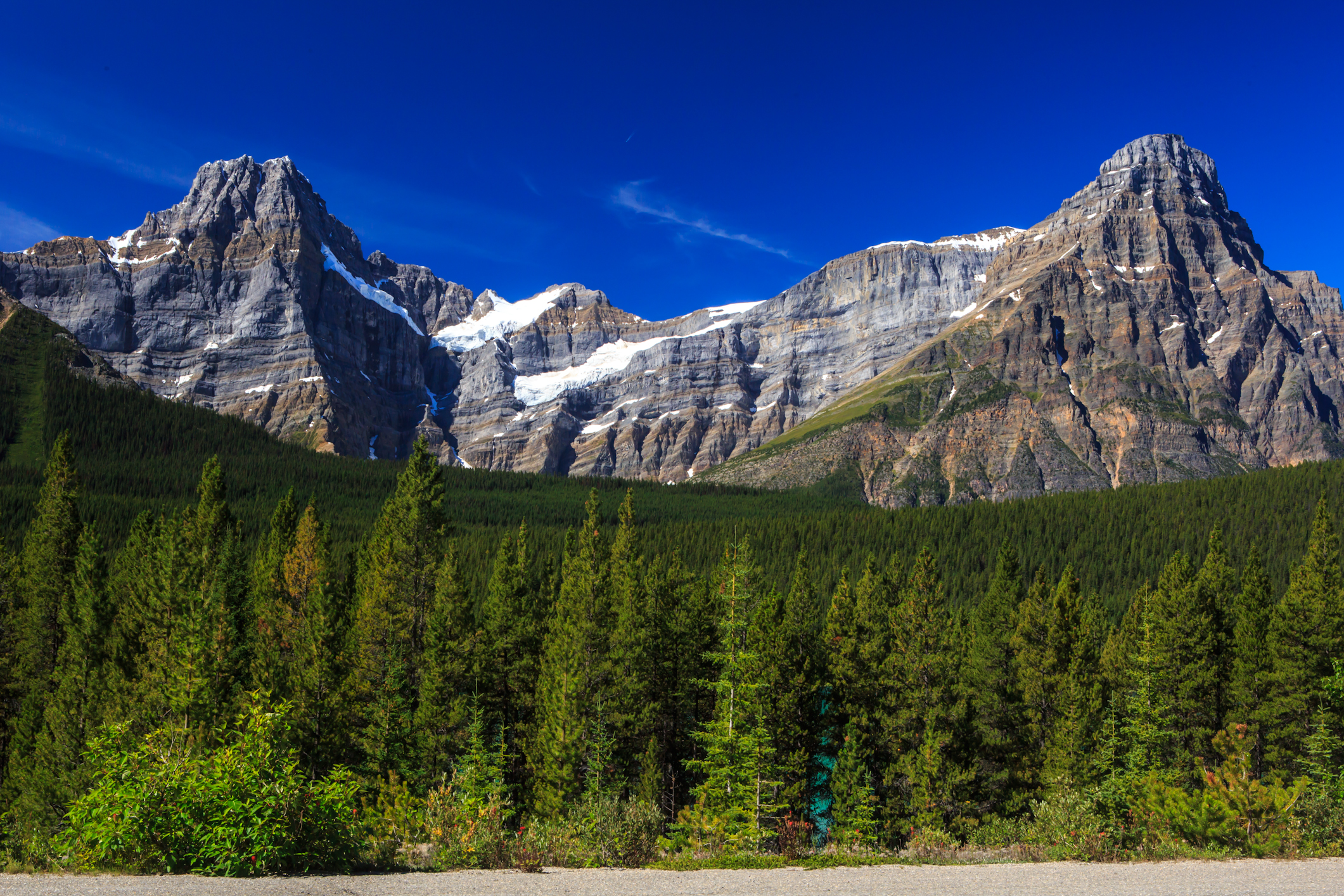
- Howse Peak (left) & Mt Chephren (right)

Highest point
- Elevation: 3,295 m (10,810 ft)
- Prominence: 1,227 m (4,026 ft)
- Parent peak: Mount Hector (3394 m)
- Listing: Mountains of Alberta; Mountains of British Columbia
- Coordinates: 51°48′50″N 116°40′52″W

Geography
- Location within Alberta Location within British Columbia Location within Canada
- Interactive map of Howse Peak
- Country: Canada
- Provinces: Alberta and British Columbia
- Parent range: Waputik Mountains
- Topo map: NTS 82N15 Mistaya Lake

Climbing
- First ascent: 1902 by J. Norman Collie, H.E.M. Stutfield, G.M. Weed, H. Woolley, guided by Hans Kaufmann

Howse Peak is the highest mountain in the Waputik Mountains, a subrange of the Canadian Rockies. It is located 5 km (3 mi) west of the Icefields Parkway, above Chephren Lake, on the continental divide between Alberta and British Columbia. At 3,295 m (10,810 ft), it is the 46th highest peak in Alberta, and the 59th highest in British Columbia.

Howse Peak's name comes from Howse Pass, which lies 5 km (3 mi) to the west. The pass was named by David Thompson, after the Hudson's Bay Company trader Joseph Howse, who crossed the pass in 1809. (Thompson had actually crossed the pass two years earlier.)

== Climbing ==
Howse Peak rises over 1,600 m (5,249 ft) above both the Mistaya River to the east and Howse Pass to the west, within only a few horizontal kilometres. The easiest route requires a 25 km (16 mi) hike up the Howse River and then a climb up a glacier on the west side of the peak. In addition, at least two high-quality, difficult (Grade V/VI) technical routes exist on the east side of the mountain.

The first ascent was made on August 14, 1902 by J. Norman Collie, Hugh Stutfield, G.M. Weed, and Herman Woolley, guided by Hans Kaufmann. Starting from their camp at the foot of the peak, they began the ascent with a tiring two hour jaunt through the woods, continuing onto a rocky ridge that led up to the peak. However, they soon ran into two precipitous rock faces along the ridge. The first was tackled with little difficulty, the second however proved a more formidable challenge. With much time and effort expended, Kaufmann and Woolley managed to descend a 50-foot perpendicular rock chimney. The rest of the group however decided to descend into the valley before re-attaining the ridge further along. After a long snow grind interrupted by a few crevasses, they reached the summit eight hours from their starting point. "The summit is formed of a most enormous snow cornice running along the ridge for a great distance, and overhanging the terrific precipices which line the western side of Bear Creek above Waterfowl Lake."

== Geology ==
Like other mountains in Banff National Park, Howse Peak is composed of black limestone and yellow sedimentary rock laid down during the Precambrian to Jurassic periods. Formed in shallow seas, this sedimentary rock was pushed east and over the top of younger rock during the Laramide orogeny.

== Climate ==
Based on the Köppen climate classification, Howse Peak is located in a subarctic climate zone with cold, snowy winters, and mild summers. Temperatures can drop below −20 °C with wind chill factors below −30 °C. Precipitation runoff from Howse Peak drains into the Mistaya River, Howse River, and the Blaeberry River.

== Incidents ==
On 16 April 2019, David Lama, Jess Roskelley and Hansjörg Auer were killed by an avalanche during their descent after having climbed the mountain's east face on a new route.

== Gallery ==
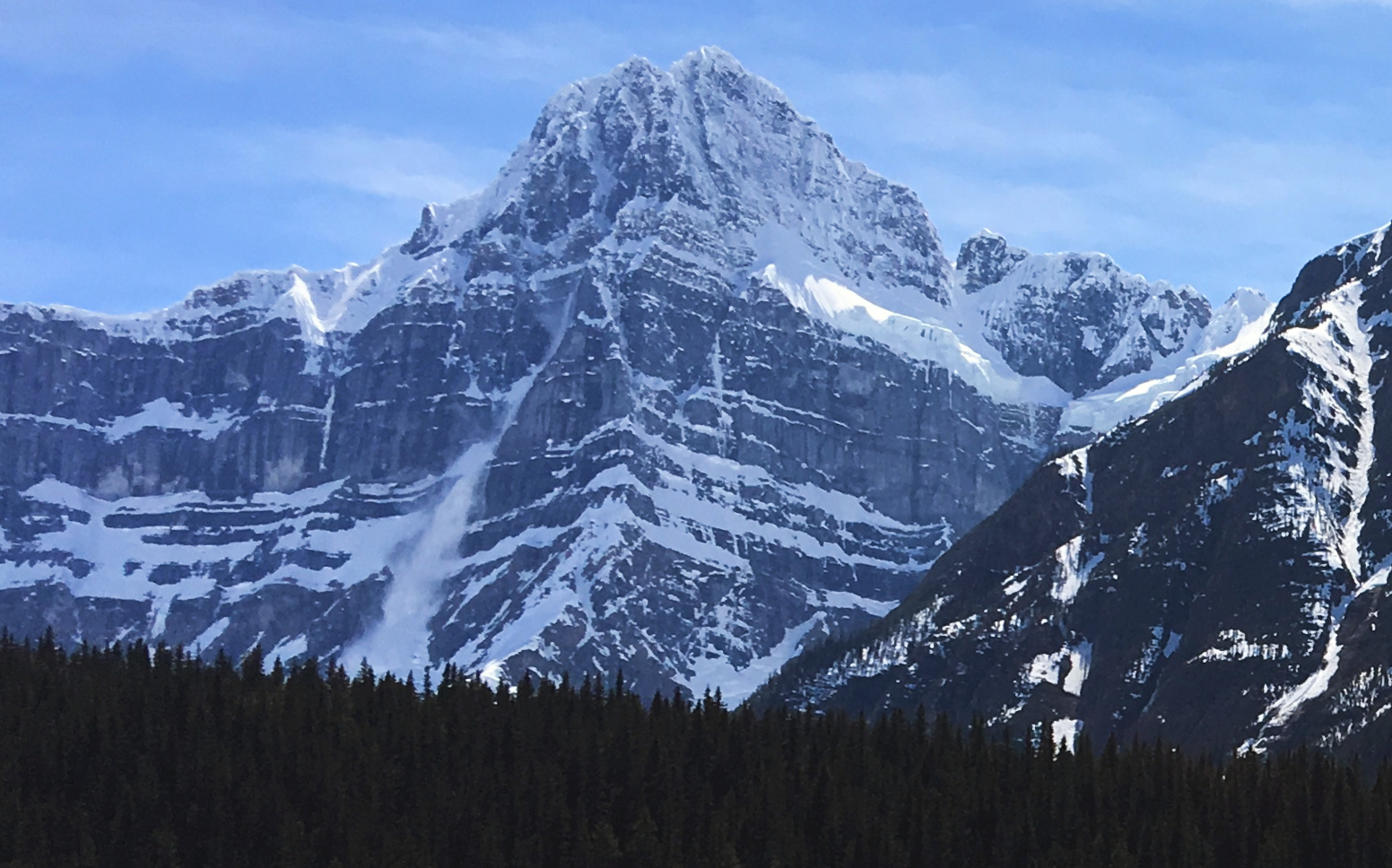
Howse Peak

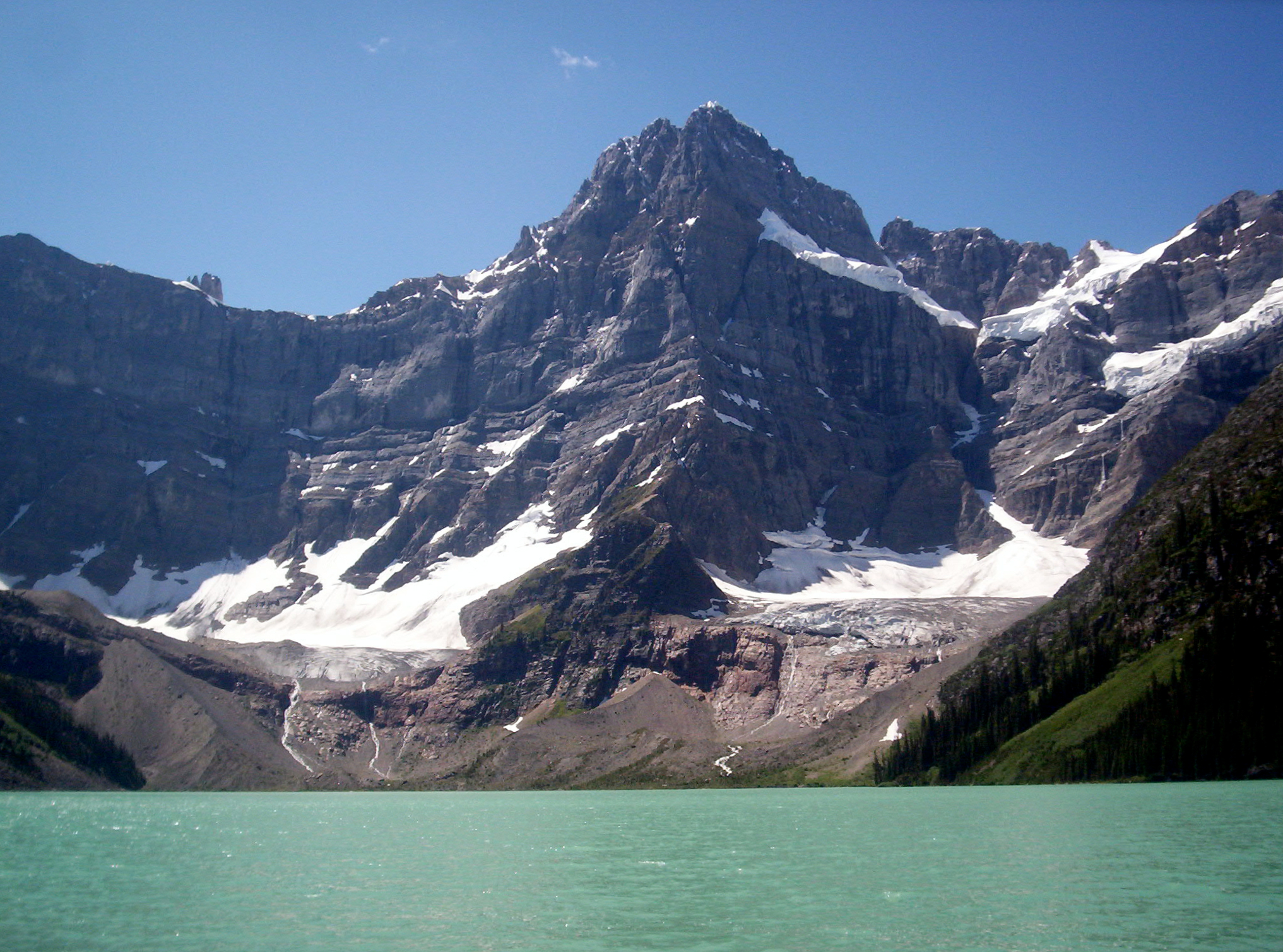
Howse Peak above Chephren Lake
