= Howse River =

River in Alberta, Canada

Coordinates: 51°57′29″N 116°45′02″W

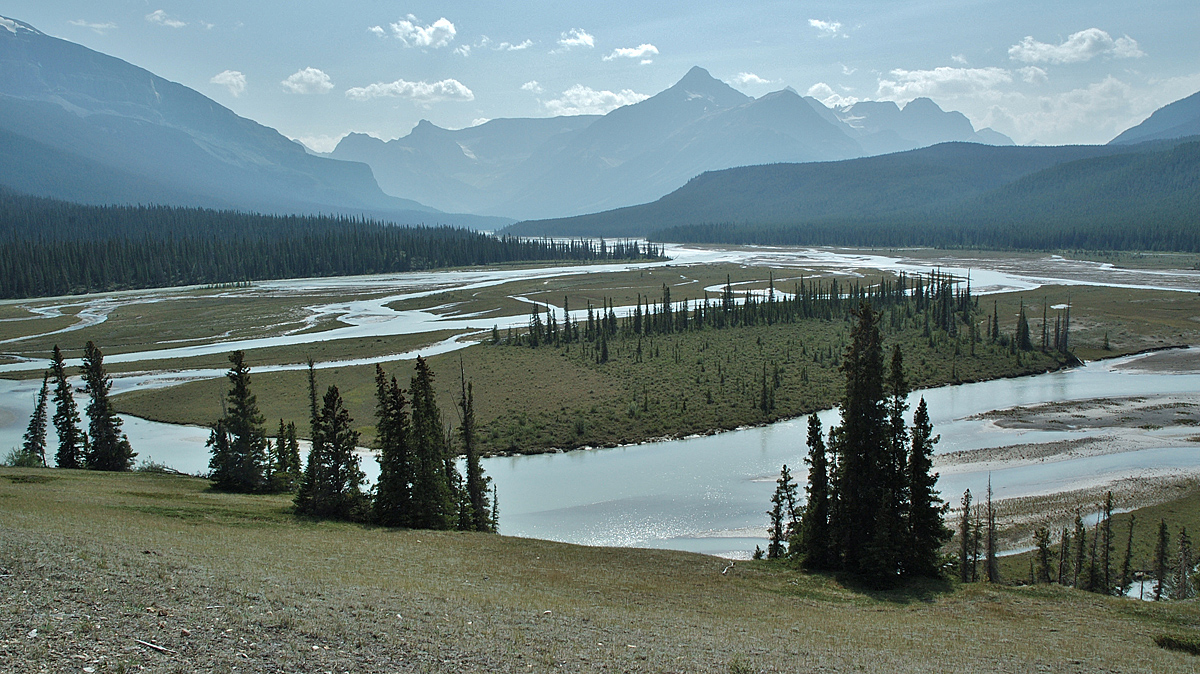
Howse River from Glacier Lake Trail

The Howse River is a tributary of the North Saskatchewan River in western Alberta, Canada.

The Howse River is a braided river, with several streams crossing in its flood plain. It is formed when Freshfield, Forbes, David and Lagoon Creek unite and flow north to discharge into the North Saskatchewan River at Saskatchewan River Crossing.

From the headwaters of Forbes Creek, the river has a total length of 33 km.

== See also ==
- List of rivers of Alberta
