= Mistaya River =

River in Alberta, Canada

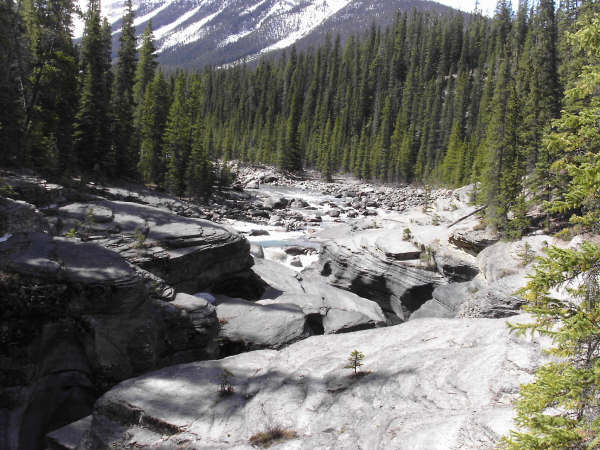
- Mistaya River before the falls

- Location within Alberta

Location
- Country: Canada
- Province: Alberta
- Protected area: Banff National Park

Physical characteristics
- Source
  - coordinates: 51°58′03″N 116°43′23″W
- Mouth
  - location: Peyto Lake
- Length: 38 km (24 mi)

Basin features
- River system: North Saskatchewan River
- Topo map: NTS 82N15 Mistaya Lake

The Mistaya River is a short river in western Alberta, Canada. It flows through Banff National Park in the Canadian Rockies, and a section of the Icefields Parkway was built along its course.

Mistaya River originates in Peyto Lake, a glacial lake of typical blue colour (due to rock flour). Mistaya flows north-west, receiving the waters of creeks such as Delta, Silverhorn, Cirque, Noyes, Chephren, Totem, Epaulette, Bison, Kaufmann and Sarbach. A series of elongated lakes are formed along the river: Mistaya Lake and Waterfowl Lakes.

Mistaya merges into the North Saskatchewan River at the Saskatchewan River Crossing.

From its headwaters of Peyto Creek, Mistaya River has a total length of 38 km.

The origin of the name is from the Cree language: ᒥᐢᑕᐦᐊᔭ (mistahaya) means 'grizzly bear'.

== See also ==
- List of rivers of Alberta
