= Pulpit Peak =

Mountain peak in Banff NP, Alberta, Canada

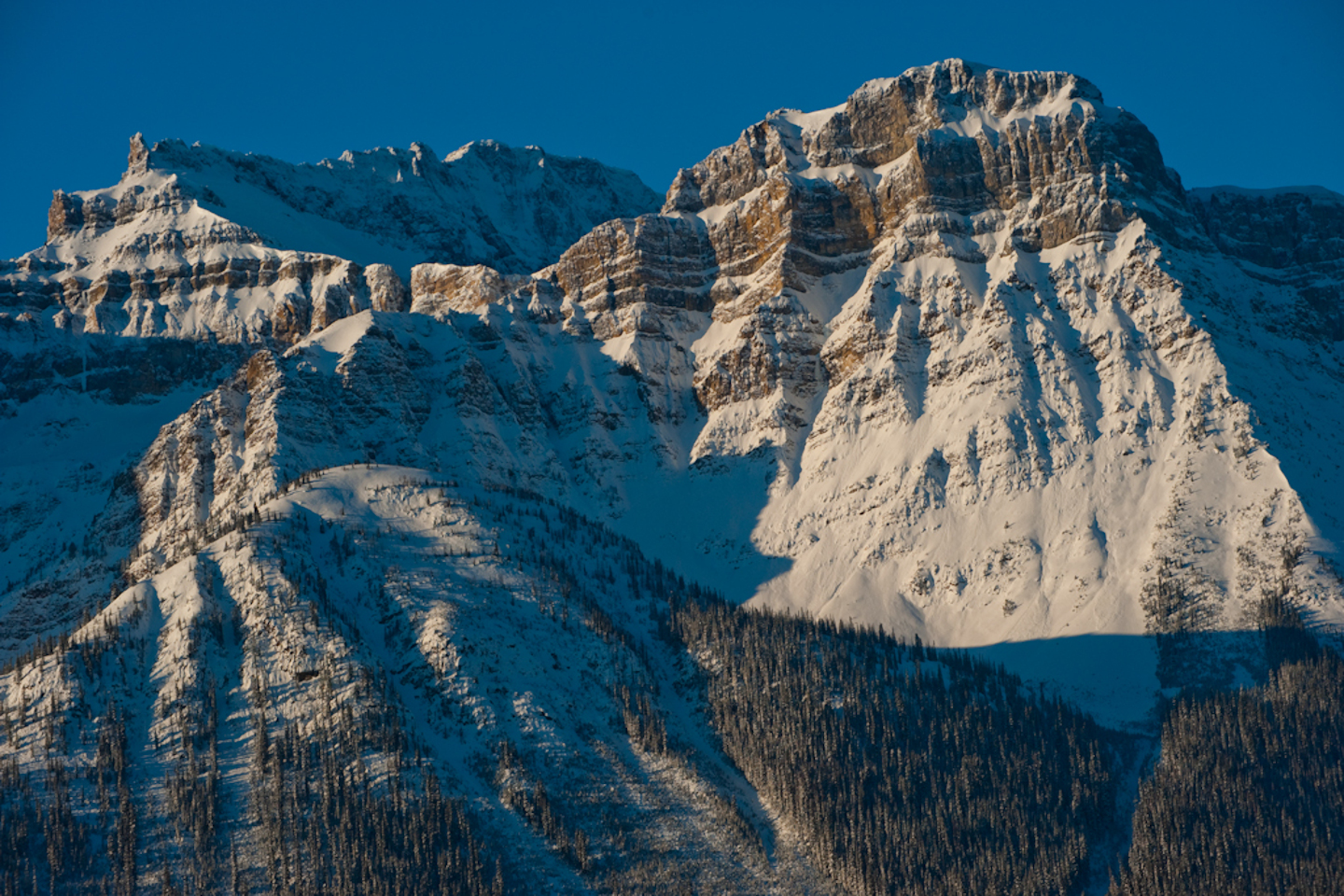
- Pulpit Peak & N. Shoulder from Icefields Parkway

Highest point
- Elevation: 2,720 m (8,920 ft)
- Prominence: 140 m (460 ft)
- Parent peak: Lilliput Mountain (2925 m)
- Listing: Mountains of Alberta
- Coordinates: 51°34′05″N 116°22′05″W

Geography
- Location within Alberta Location within Canada
- Interactive map of Pulpit Peak
- Country: Canada
- Province: Alberta
- Protected area: Banff National Park
- Parent range: Waputik Range; Canadian Rockies
- Topo map: NTS 82N9 Hector Lake

Geology
- Rock age: Cambrian
- Rock type: Sedimentary

Climbing
- Easiest route: Scramble

Pulpit Peak is a 2,720-metre (8,920-foot) mountain summit located one km south of Hector Lake in Banff National Park, in the Canadian Rockies of Alberta, Canada. Its nearest higher peak is Lilliput Mountain, 3.6 km (2.2 mi) to the southwest. Pulpit Peak is situated east of the Waputik Icefield, and is a member of the Waputik Mountains. Pulpit Peak can be seen from the Icefields Parkway towering 900 metres (2,950 ft) above Hector Lake.

== History ==
Pulpit Peak was named in 1898 by Charles Sproull Thompson (1869–1921), who participated in numerous first ascents in the Canadian Rockies. He believed the peak resembled a pulpit in a church. The mountain's name was officially adopted in 1924 by the Geographical Names Board of Canada.

== Geology ==
Like other mountains in Banff Park, Pulpit Peak is composed of sedimentary rock laid down during the Precambrian to Jurassic periods. Formed in shallow seas, this sedimentary rock was pushed east and over the top of younger rock during the Laramide orogeny.

== Climate ==
Based on the Köppen climate classification, Pulpit Peak is located in a subarctic climate zone with cold, snowy winters, and mild summers. Temperatures can drop below -20 °C with wind chill factors below -30 °C. Precipitation runoff from Pulpit Peak drains into the Bow River which is a tributary of the Saskatchewan River.

== Gallery ==
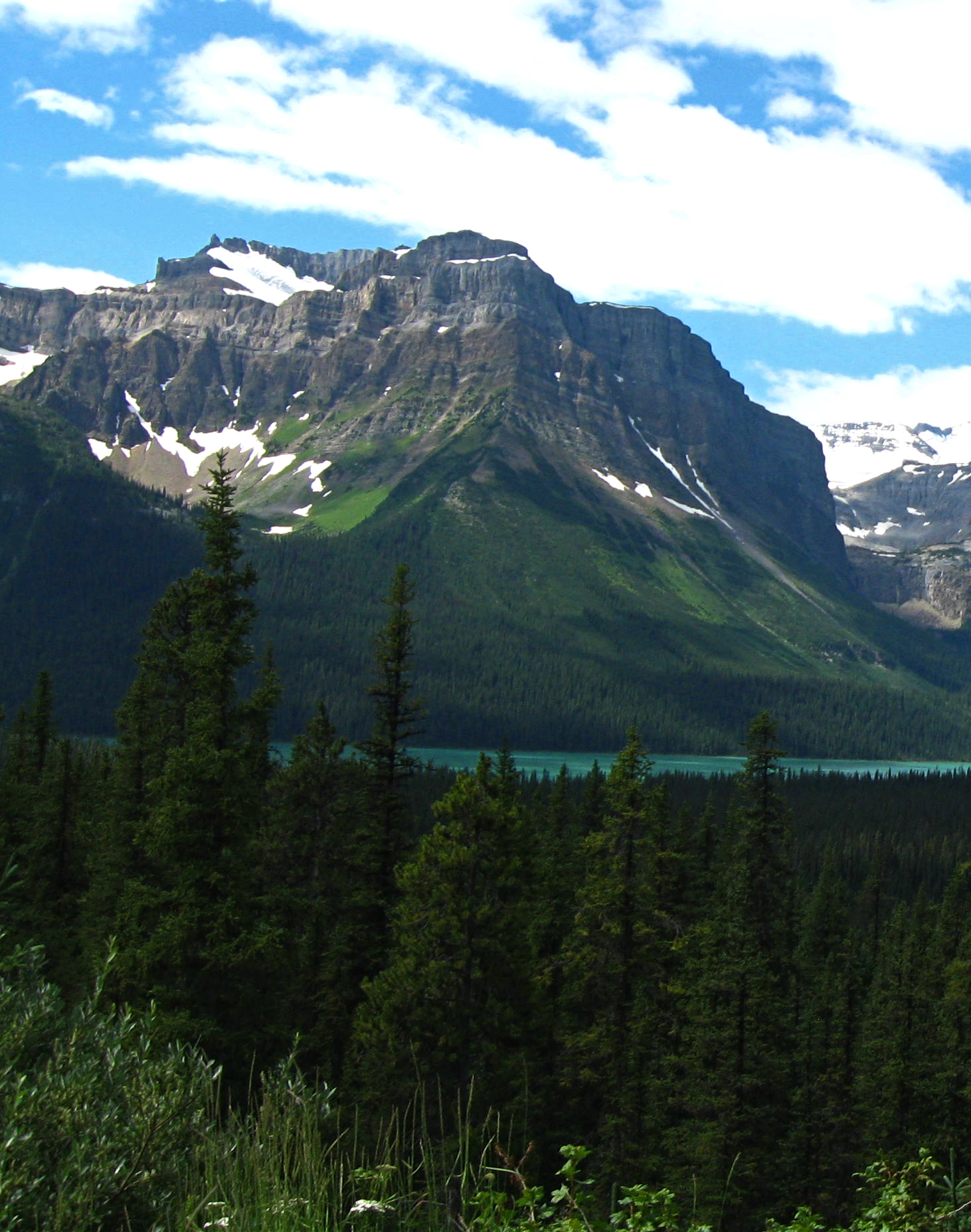
Pulpit Peak seen from Icefields Parkway at Hector Lake

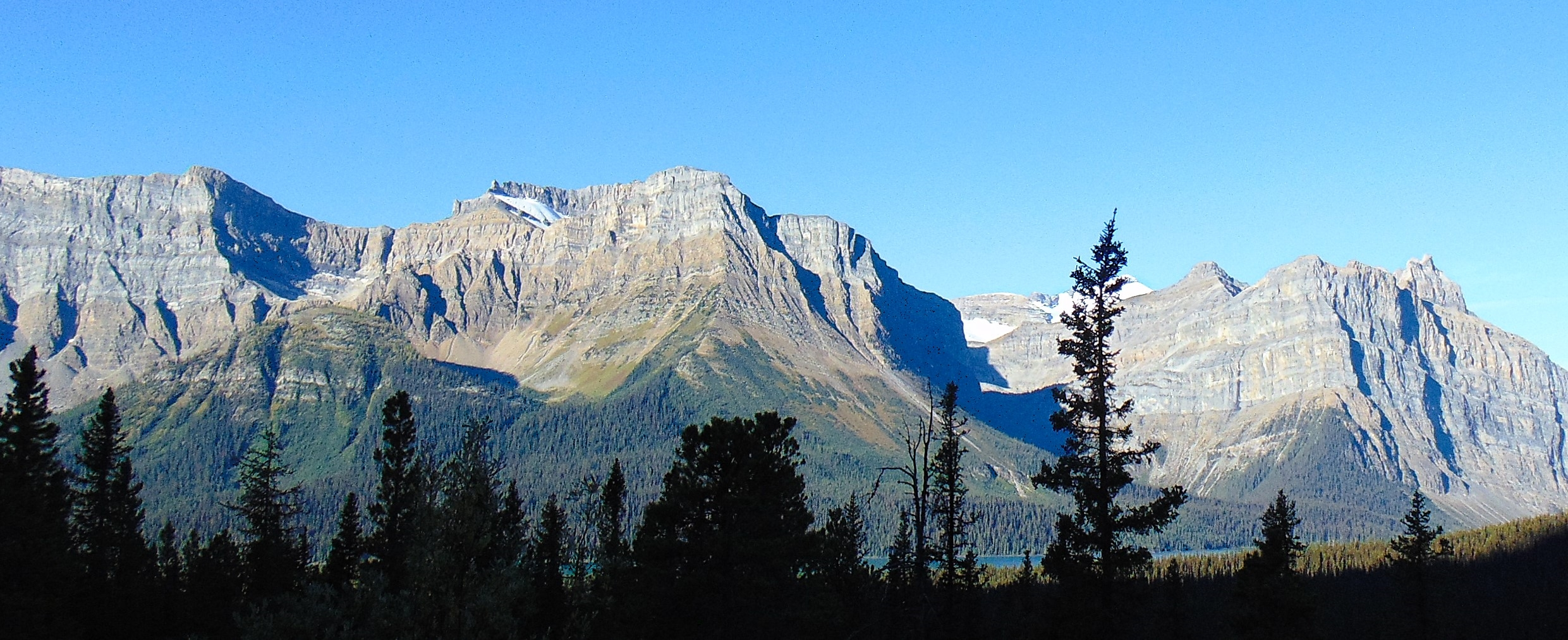
Pulpit Peak seen from Icefields Parkway at Hector Lake

== See also ==
- Geography of Alberta
