= Mount Drummond =

Mount Drummond may refer to

- Mount Drummond (Alberta) in Alberta, Canada
- Mount Drummond (South Australia) a locality in the District Council of Lower Eyre Peninsula, South Australia, Australia
