= Mount Balfour =

Mountain in Canadian Rockies

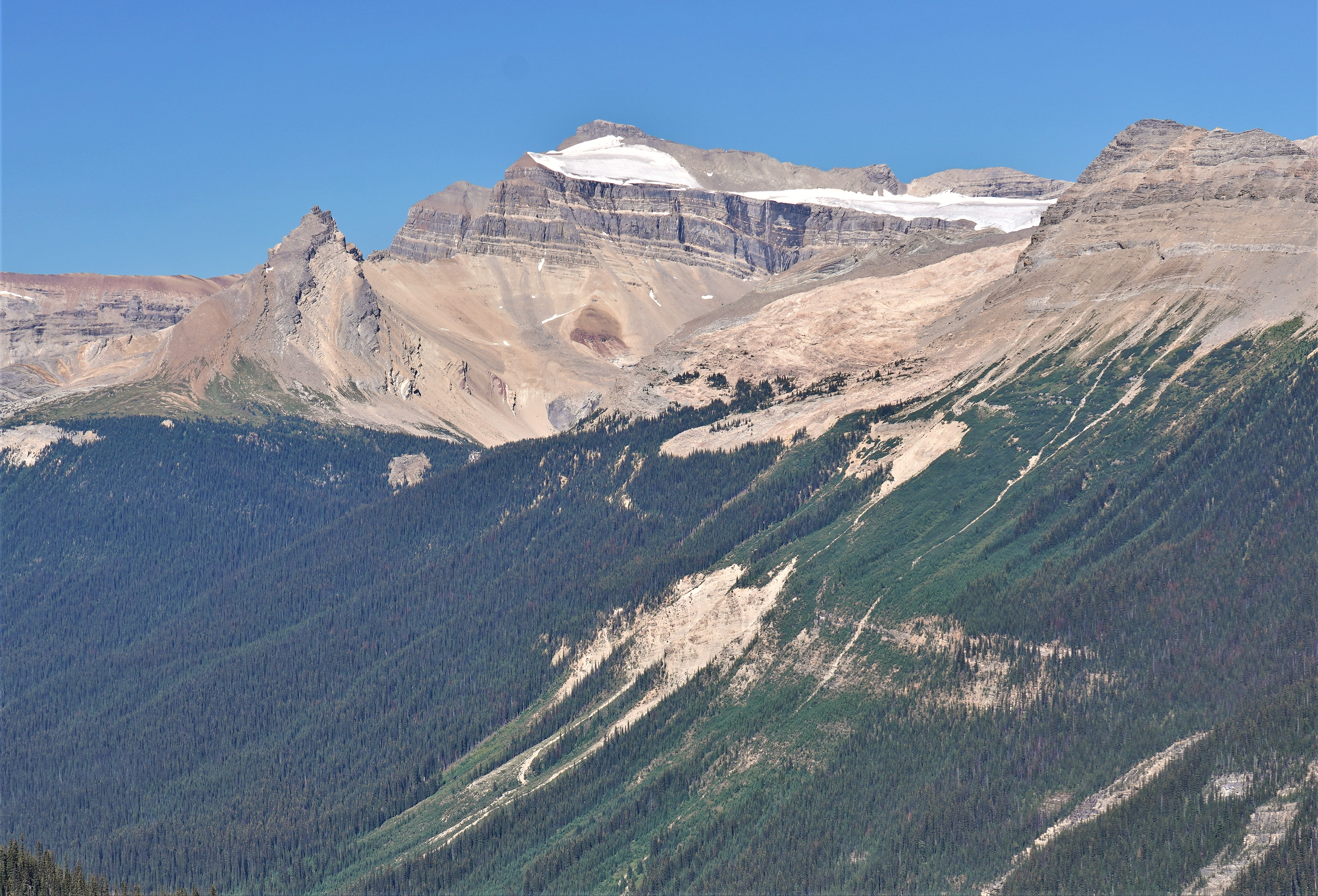
- Mount Balfour from Iceline Trail

Highest point
- Elevation: 3,272 m (10,735 ft)
- Prominence: 934 m (3,064 ft)
- Parent peak: Howse Peak (3295 m)
- Listing: Mountains of Alberta; Mountains of British Columbia
- Coordinates: 51°33′55″N 116°27′58″W

Geography
- Location within Alberta Location within British Columbia Location within Canada
- Interactive map of Mount Balfour
- Country: Canada
- Provinces: Alberta and British Columbia
- Protected areas: Banff National Park; Yoho National Park
- Parent range: Waputik Range
- Topo map: NTS 82N9 Hector Lake

Climbing
- First ascent: 1898 C.L. Noyes, C.S. Thompson, G.M. Weed; Appalachian Mountain Club

Mount Balfour is a mountain located on the Continental Divide, part of the border between British Columbia and Alberta, in the Waputik Range in the Park Ranges of the Canadian Rockies. It is the 71st highest peak in Alberta and the 113th highest in British Columbia; it is also the 52nd most prominent in Alberta.

The mountain was named by James Hector in 1859 after Professor John Hutton Balfour, a Scottish botanist and instructor at the University of Edinburgh where Hector had studied.

== Climbing History ==
Early attempts to climb the mountain were made from Niles Pass via Sherbrooke Lake. The first ascent was made on August 18, 1898, by C.L. Noyes, C.S. Thompson, G.M. Weed; members of the Appalachian Mountain Club. The party started their ascent from Hector Lake which they had reached by crossing Dolomite Pass to Bow Lake and then continuing south. C.E. Fay had also attempted the mountain in 1898 via the Sherbrooke Lake/Niles Pass approach but were eventually turned back by poor weather and inexperience. Parties from the ACC completed ascents of Balfour in 1909 via Sherbrooke Lake, Niles Pass, Daly Glacier and then summitting via the SE arête.

== Geology ==
Mount Balfour is composed of sedimentary rock laid down during the Precambrian to Jurassic periods. Formed in shallow seas, this sedimentary rock was pushed east and over the top of younger rock during the Laramide orogeny.

== Climate ==
Based on the Köppen climate classification, Mount Balfour is located in a subarctic climate with cold, snowy winters, and mild summers. Temperatures can drop below −20 °C with wind chill factors below −30 °C.

== Gallery ==
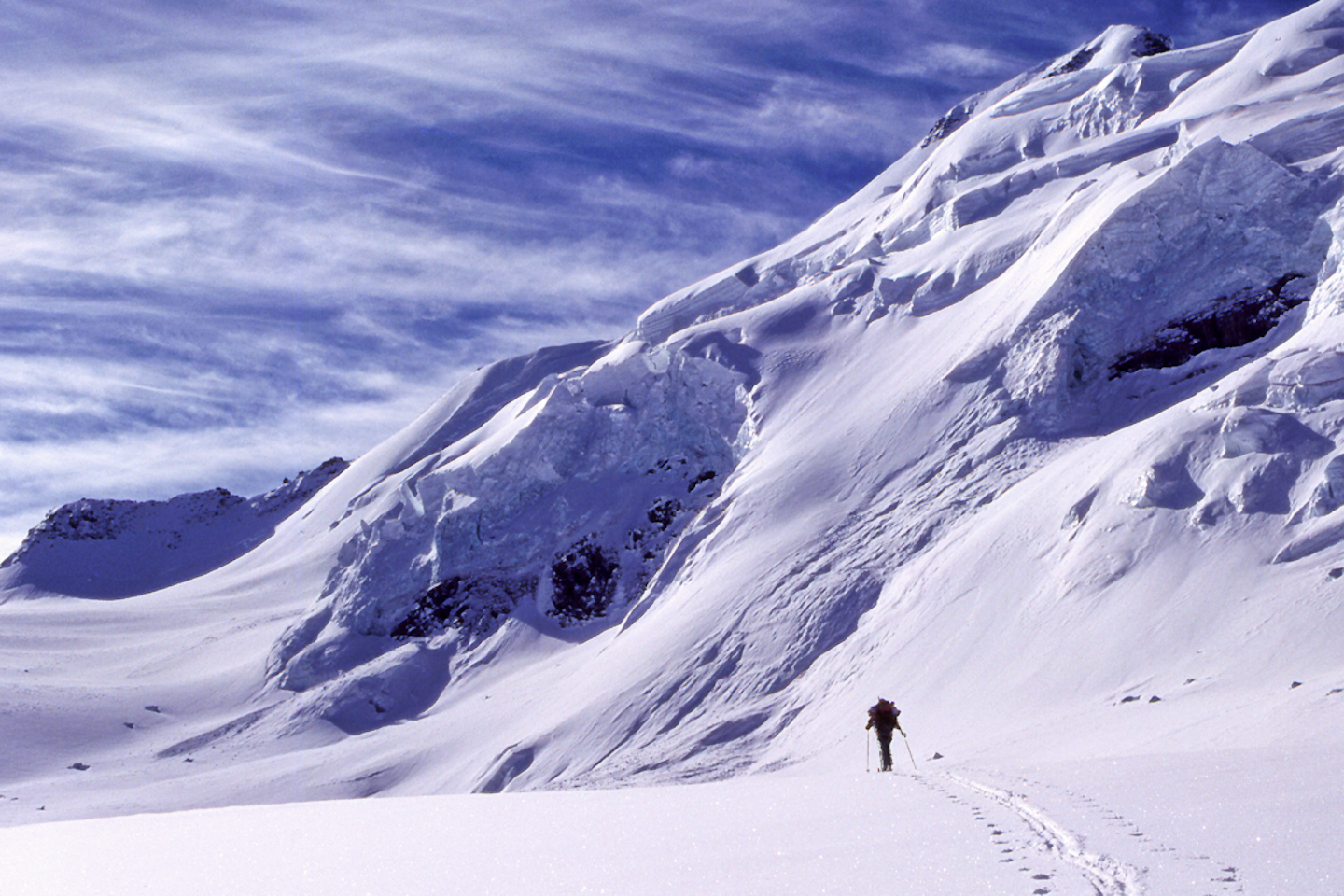
Mt. Balfour approach to col off to the left

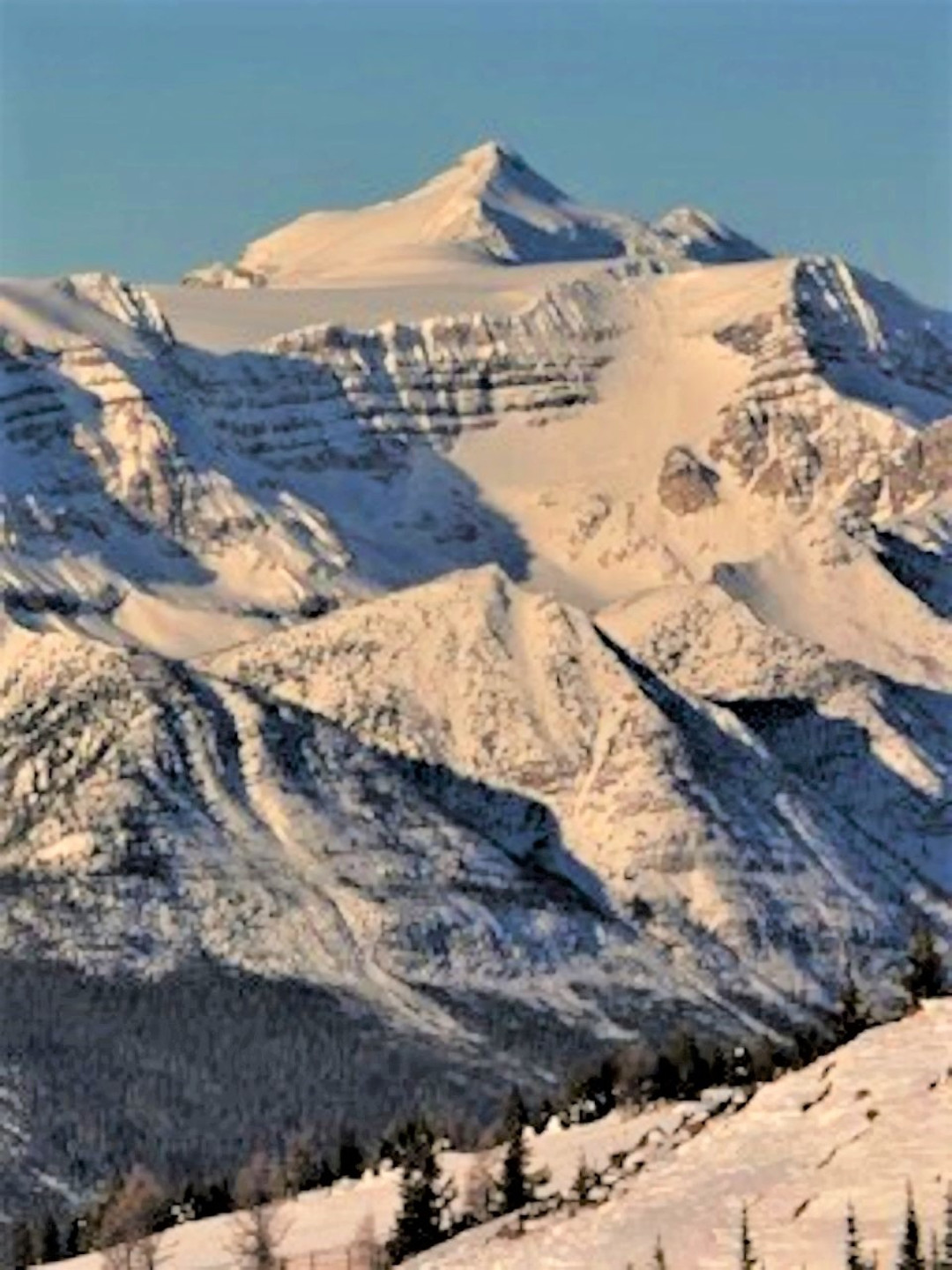
Mt. Balfour from Ski Louise ski resort

== See also ==
- List of peaks on the British Columbia–Alberta border
- List of mountains in the Canadian Rockies
