= Waputik Peak =

Mountain in Alberta, Canada

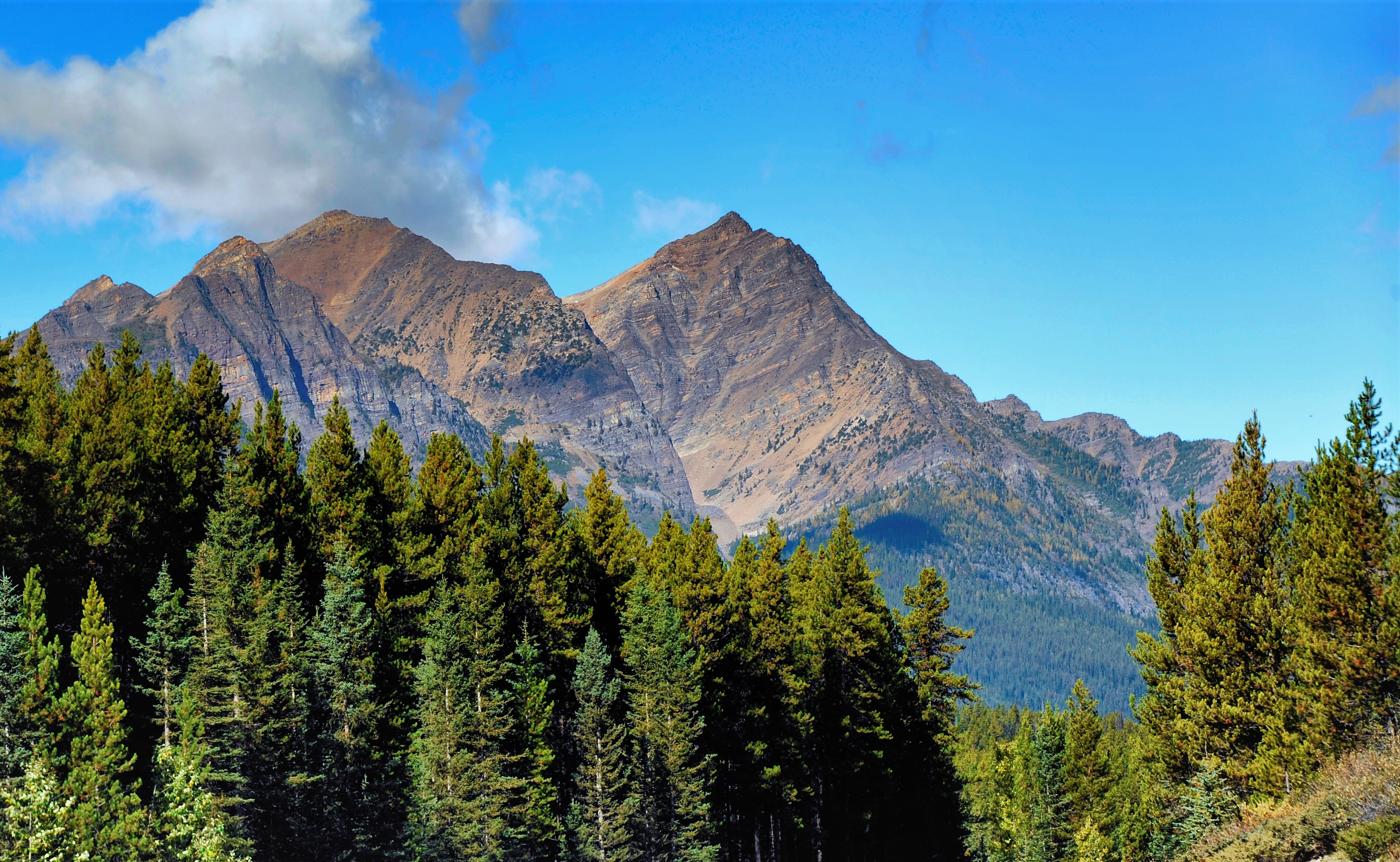
- Southeast aspect

Highest point
- Elevation: 2,736 m (8,976 ft)
- Prominence: 484 m (1,588 ft)
- Listing: Mountains of Alberta
- Coordinates: 51°30′13″N 116°19′05″W

Geography
- Location within Alberta
- Country: Canada
- Province: Alberta
- Parent range: Waputik Range
- Topo map: NTS 82N9 Hector Lake

Climbing
- First ascent: Dominion Topographic Survey

Waputik Peak was named by George Mercer Dawson in 1884. It is located in the Waputik Range in Alberta.

"Waputik" means "white goat" in the Stoney language.

== Geology ==
Like other mountains in Banff Park, Waputik Peak is composed of sedimentary rock laid down during the Precambrian to Jurassic periods. Formed in shallow seas, this sedimentary rock was pushed east and over the top of younger rock during the Laramide orogeny.

== Climate ==
Based on the Köppen climate classification, Waputik Peak is located in a subarctic climate zone with cold, snowy winters, and mild summers. Temperatures in winter can drop below −20 °C with wind chill factors below −30 °C.

== See also ==
- Geology of Alberta
- Geography of Alberta
