= Bow Peak =

Mountain peak in Banff National Park, Alberta, Canada

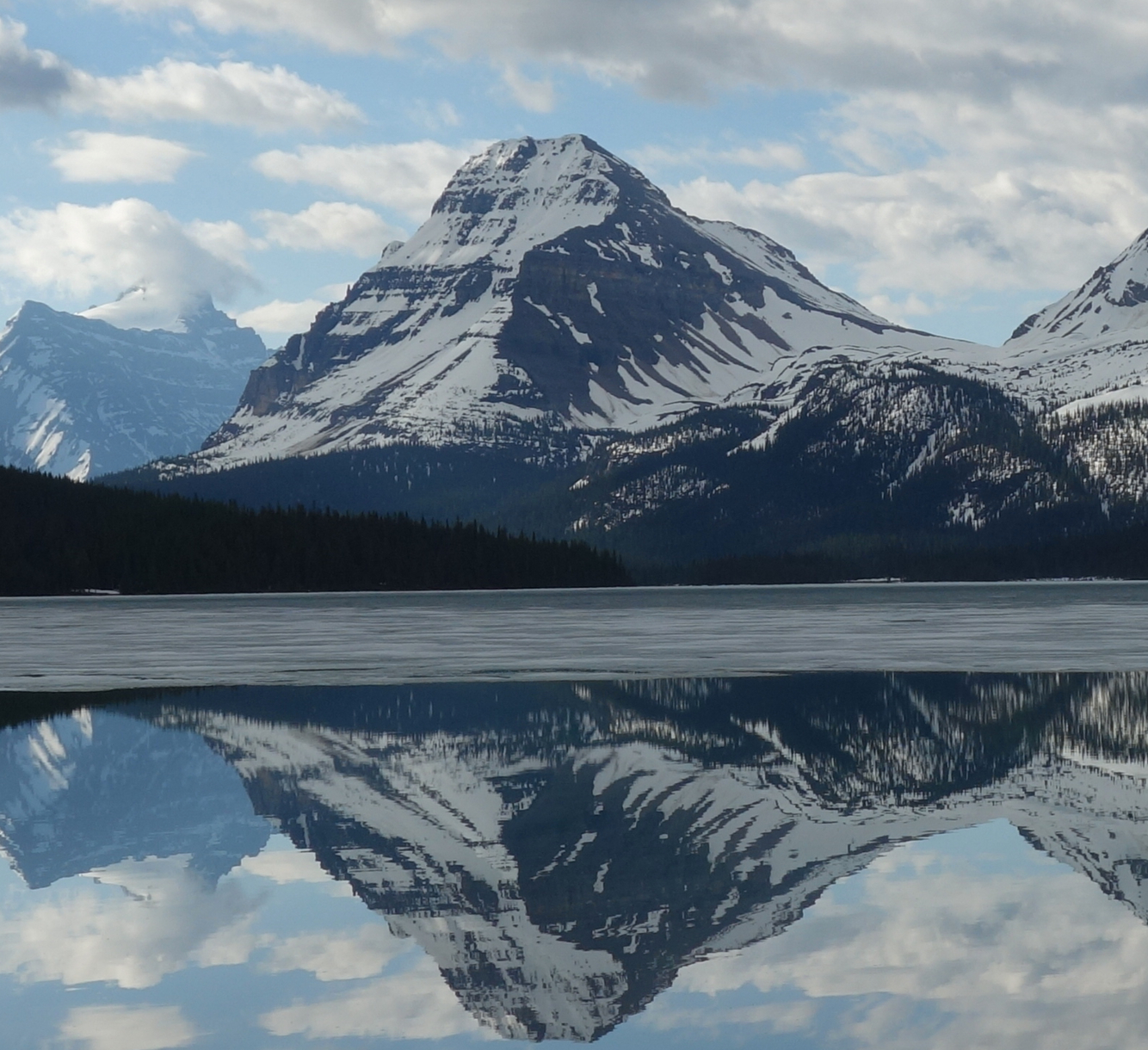
- Bow Peak reflected in Bow Lake

Highest point
- Elevation: 2,840 m (9,320 ft)
- Prominence: 493 m (1,617 ft)
- Parent peak: Crowfoot Mountain (3055 m)
- Listing: Mountains of Alberta
- Coordinates: 51°37′35″N 116°22′45″W

Geography
- Location within Alberta Location within Canada
- Country: Canada
- Province: Alberta
- Protected area: Banff National Park
- Parent range: Canadian Rockies
- Topo map: NTS 82N9 Hector Lake

Geology
- Rock age: Cambrian
- Rock type: Sedimentary rock

Climbing
- Easiest route: Scramble

Bow Peak is a 2,840-metre (9,320-foot) mountain summit located in the Bow River valley of Banff National Park, in the Canadian Rockies of Alberta, Canada. Its nearest higher peak is Crowfoot Mountain, 2.11 km (1.31 mi) to the east. Bow Peak is situated north of Hector Lake, southeast of Bow Lake, and can be seen from the Icefields Parkway. Although not of remarkable elevation, the mountain is a conspicuous landmark and visible from as far away as the Lake Louise area. Its position in the Waputik Mountains provides magnificent views from the summit.

== History ==
Bow Peak was named in 1922 for its proximity to the headwaters of the Bow River which was known by the Cree as "The place from which bows are taken." The mountain's name became official in 1924 by the Geographical Names Board of Canada.

== Geology ==
Like other mountains in Banff Park, Bow Peak is composed of sedimentary rock laid down during the Precambrian to Jurassic periods. Formed in shallow seas, this sedimentary rock was pushed east and over the top of younger rock during the Laramide orogeny.

== Climate ==
Based on the Köppen climate classification, Bow Peak is located in a subarctic climate zone with cold, snowy winters, and mild summers. Temperatures can drop below −20 °C with wind chill factors below −30 °C. Precipitation runoff from Bow Peak drains into the Bow River which is a tributary of the Saskatchewan River.

== Gallery ==
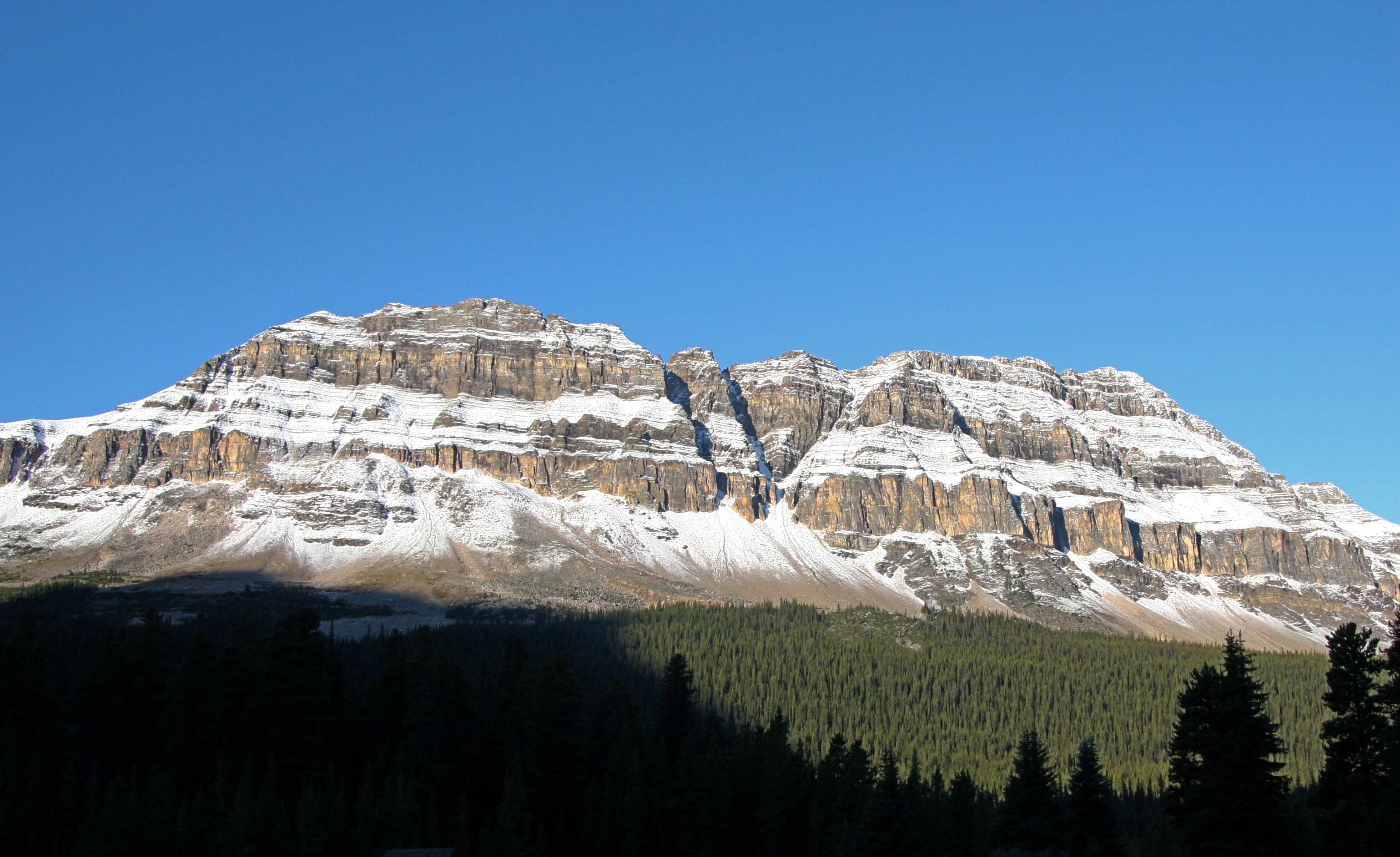
The broad east face of Bow Peak

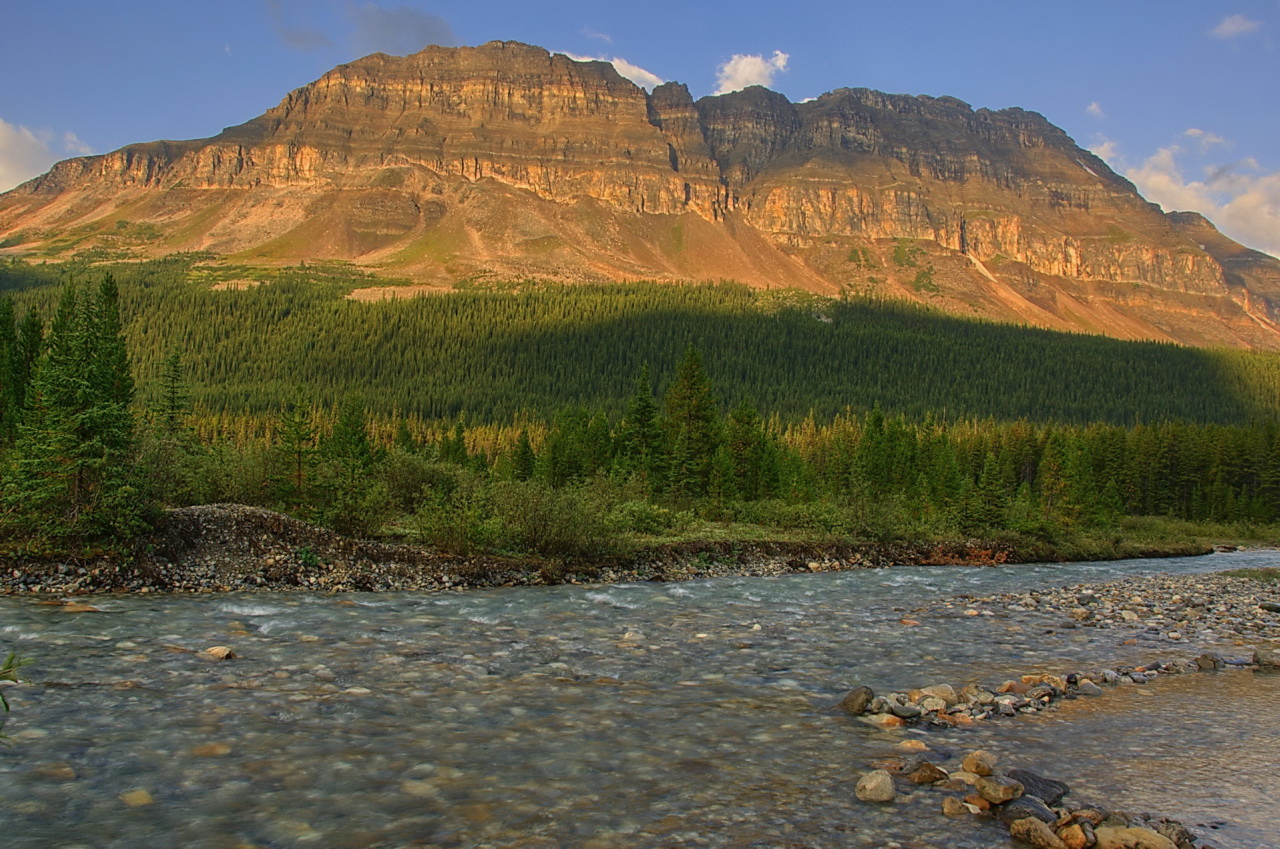
East face

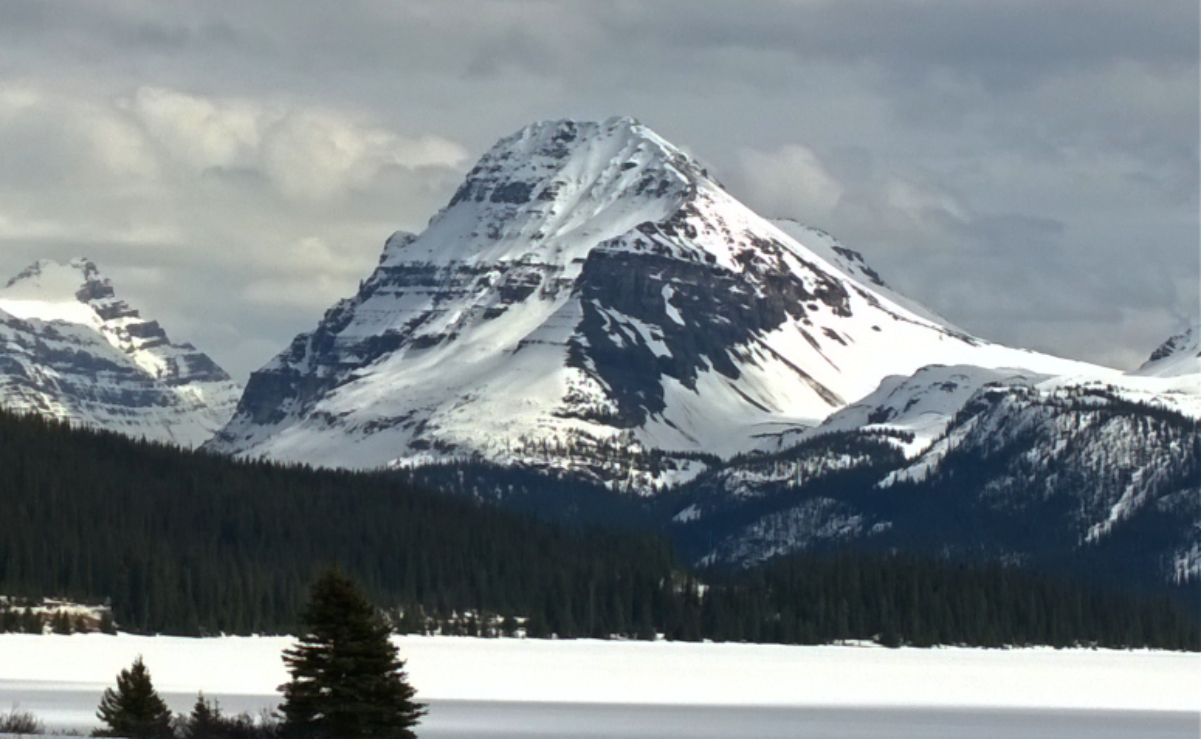
Bow Peak winter scene

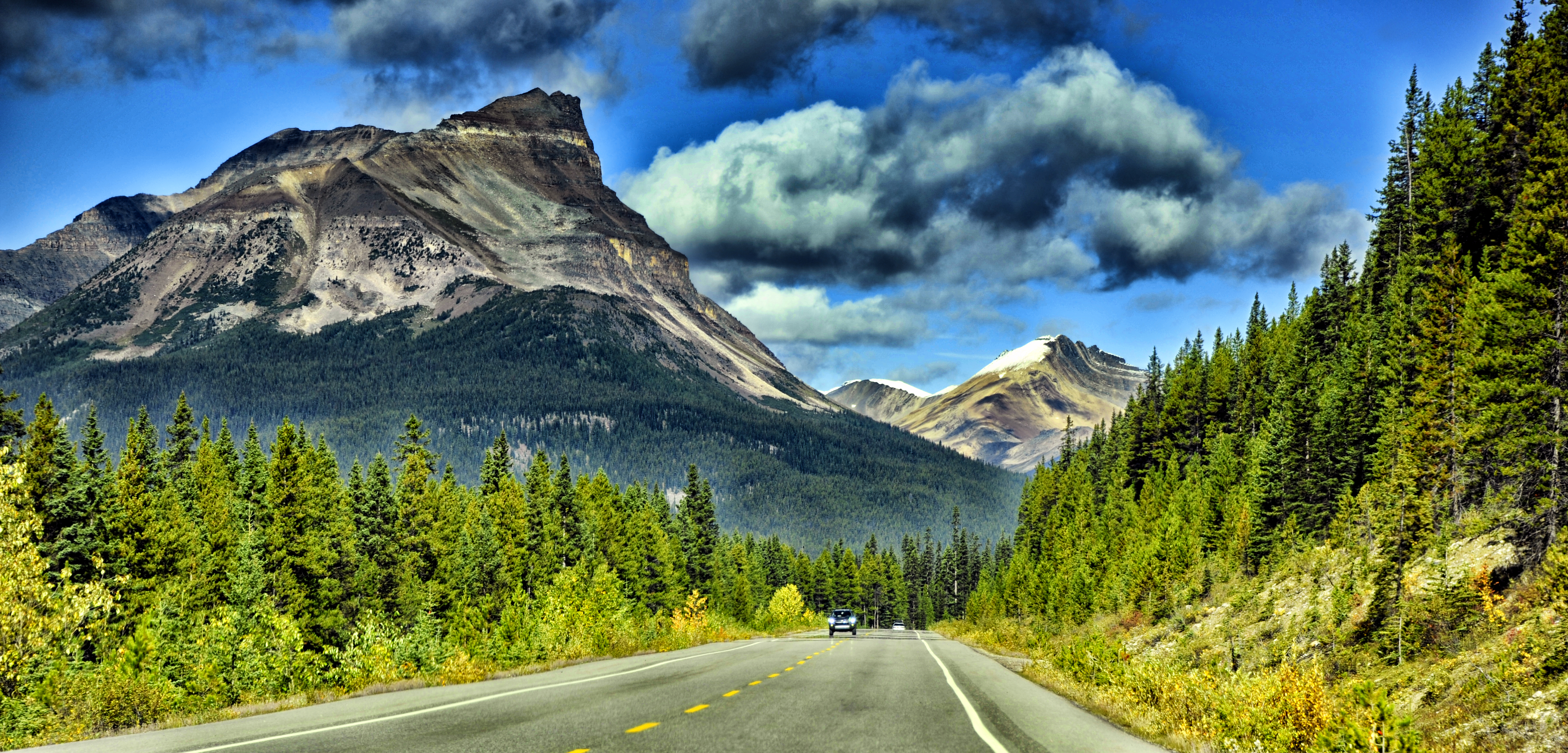
South aspect of Bow Peak (left) from Icefields Parkway

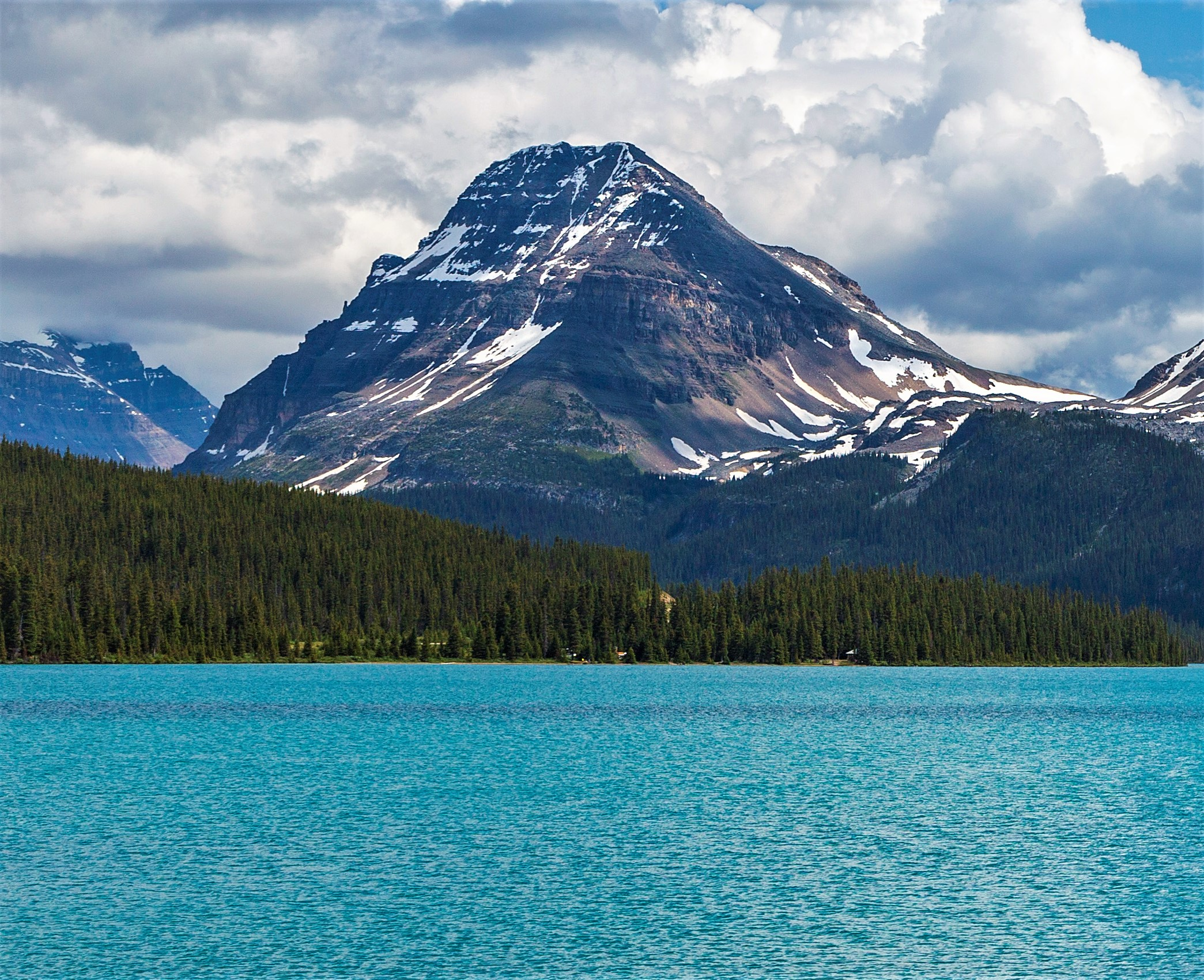
Bow Peak and Bow Lake

== See also ==
- Geography of Alberta
- Geology of Alberta
