= Caldron Peak =

Mountain in Alberta, Canada

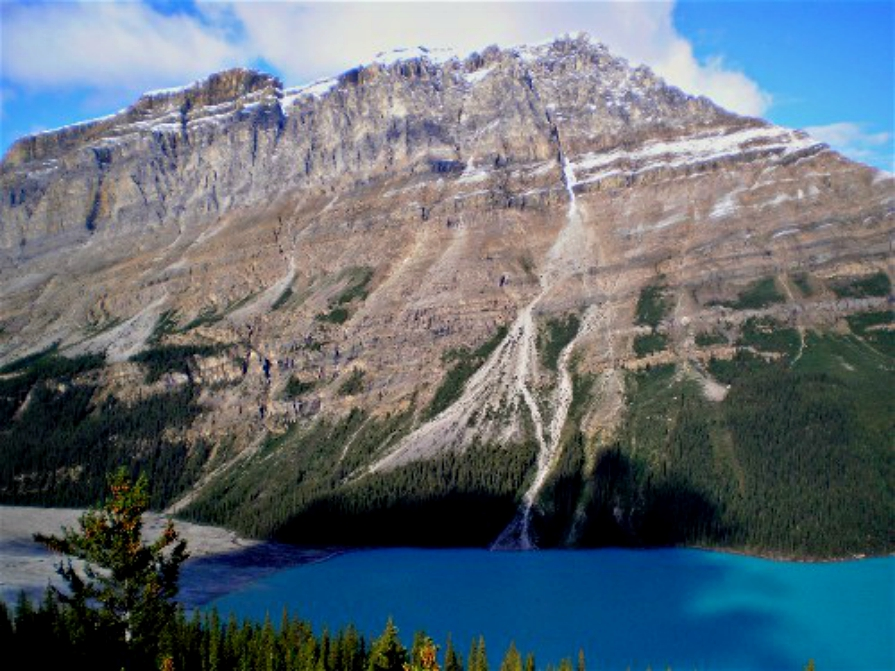
- Caldron Peak and Peyto Lake

Highest point
- Elevation: 2,911 m (9,551 ft)
- Prominence: 449 m (1,473 ft) (Note: Based on an elevation of 2909 m)
- Parent peak: Mistaya Mountain (3096 m)
- Listing: Mountains of Alberta
- Coordinates: 51°43′08″N 116°32′42″W

Geography
- Location within Alberta Location within Canada
- Country: Canada
- Province: Alberta
- Protected area: Banff National Park
- Parent range: Waputik Range; Canadian Rockies
- Topo map: NTS 82N10 Blaeberry River

Climbing
- First ascent: 1948 FRA: C. Beattie and an ACC party

Caldron Peak is a 2,911-metre (9,551 ft) mountain peak of the Waputik Range, located in Alberta, Canada. It is prominently visible from the Peyto Lake Overlook in Banff National Park.

It was named after Caldron Lake which is 3 km (1.9 mi) from its summit.

== Geology ==
Like other mountains in Banff Park, Caldron Peak is composed of sedimentary rock laid down during the Precambrian to Jurassic periods. Formed in shallow seas, this sedimentary rock was pushed east and over the top of younger rock during the Laramide orogeny.

== Climate ==
Based on the Köppen climate classification, Caldron Peak is located in a subarctic climate with cold, snowy winters, and mild summers. Temperatures can drop below -20 C with wind chill factors below -30 C. Precipitation runoff from Caldron Peak Peak drains into the Mistaya River which is a tributary of the North Saskatchewan River.
