= Hector Glacier =

Glacier in Banff National Park, Canada

- Location within Alberta Location within British Columbia Location within Canada
- Interactive map of Hector Glacier
- Location: Alberta, Canada
- Coordinates: 51°35′24″N 116°15′36″W
- Length: 3 kilometres (2 mi)
- Status: Receding

Hector Glacier is located in Banff National Park, Alberta, Canada. The glacier is on the north slope of Mount Hector and extends northward for 3 km (1.9 mi). In 1938, a large mass of the glacier broke off and covered the valley below with ice up to 60 m (200 ft) thick. The ice mass destroyed everything in its path and this is only the second known glacier hazard to have been recorded in the Canadian Rockies. The glacier, along with Mount Hector and Hector Lake are all named after James Hector, a prominent early naturalist to the region.

== See also ==
- List of glaciers
