= Mount Drummond (Alberta) =

Mountain in Alberta, Canada

- Location within Alberta

Highest point
- Elevation: 3,148 m (10,328 ft)
- Prominence: 329 m (1,079 ft)
- Listing: Mountains of Alberta
- Coordinates: 51°35′29″N 116°00′43″W

Geography
- Country: Canada
- Province: Alberta
- Protected area: Banff National Park
- Parent range: Park Ranges
- Topo map: NTS 82N9 Hector Lake

Mount Drummond is a summit in Banff National Park, Alberta, Canada.

Mount Drummond was named for Thomas Drummond, an explorer.

== See also ==
- List of mountains in the Canadian Rockies
