= Crowfoot Glacier =

Glacier in Canada

Coordinates: 51°38′2.86″N 116°26′4.12″W

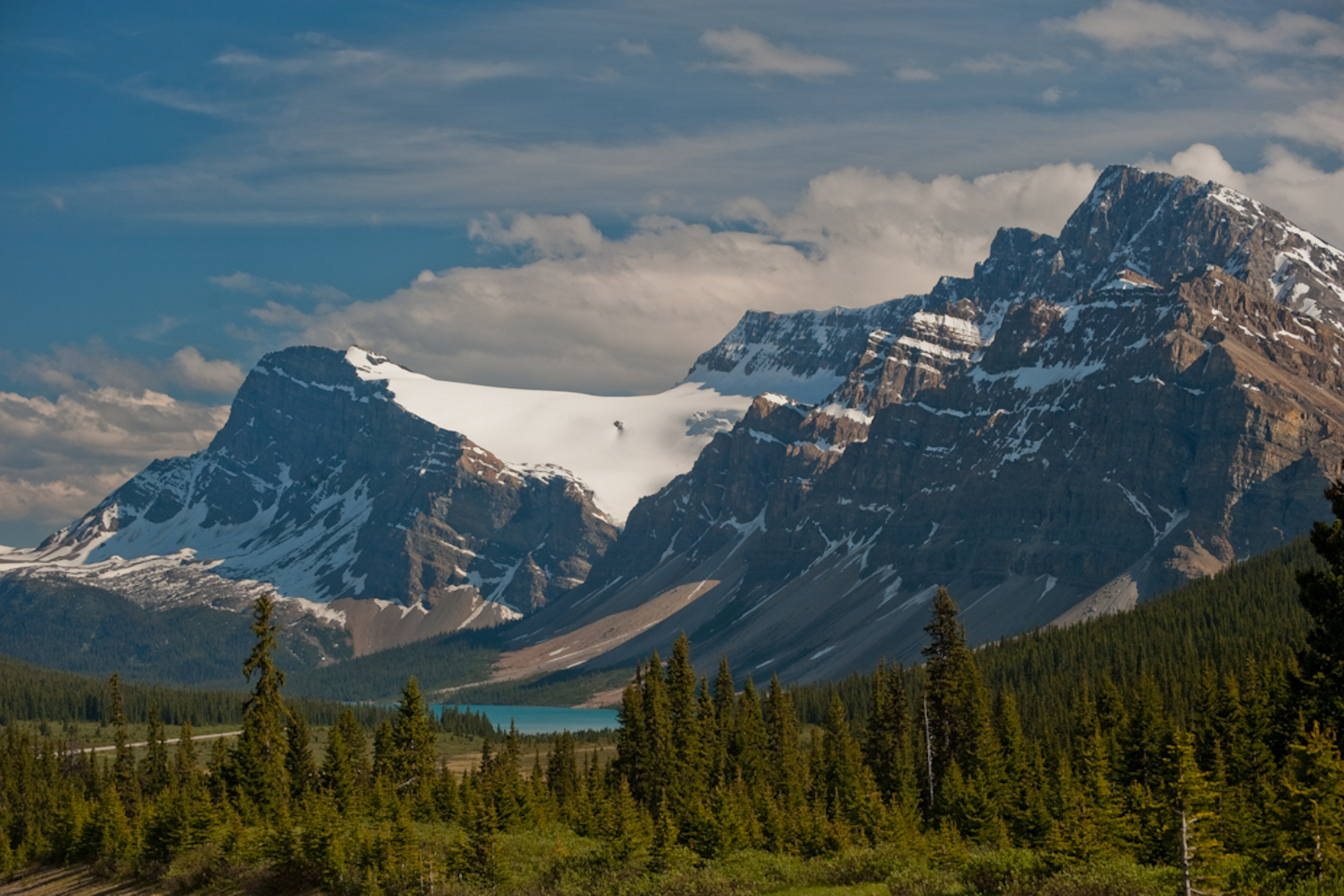
- Crowfoot Glacier and Mountain with Bow Lake.

- Location within Alberta Location within British Columbia Location within Canada
- Interactive map of Crowfoot Glacier
- Type: Mountain glacier
- Location: Alberta, Canada
- Length: 1.5 km (0.93 mi)

Crowfoot Glacier is located in Banff National Park, Alberta, Canada, 32 km (20 mi) northwest of Lake Louise, and can be viewed from the Icefields Parkway. The glacier is situated on the northeastern flank of Crowfoot Mountain.

== Geography ==
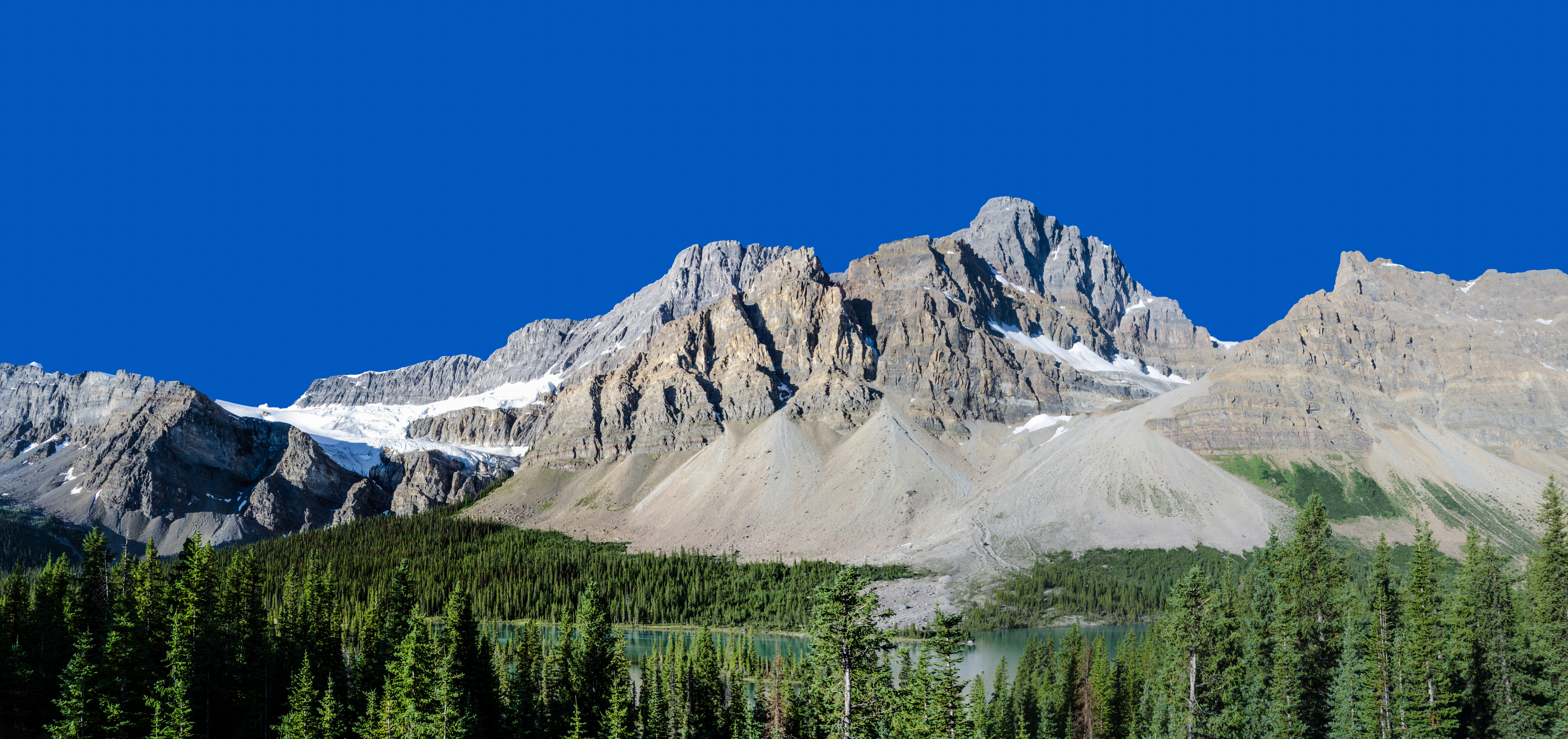
Crowfoot Glacier Panorama in August 2012, showing the Crowfoot Glacier (left) and Crowfoot Mountain (center)

Crowfoot Glacier is east of the continental divide, and runoff from the glacier supplies water to the Bow River. The glacier has retreated since the end of the Little Ice Age and now has lost one entire lobe; it therefore no longer resembles the glacier which early explorers named.

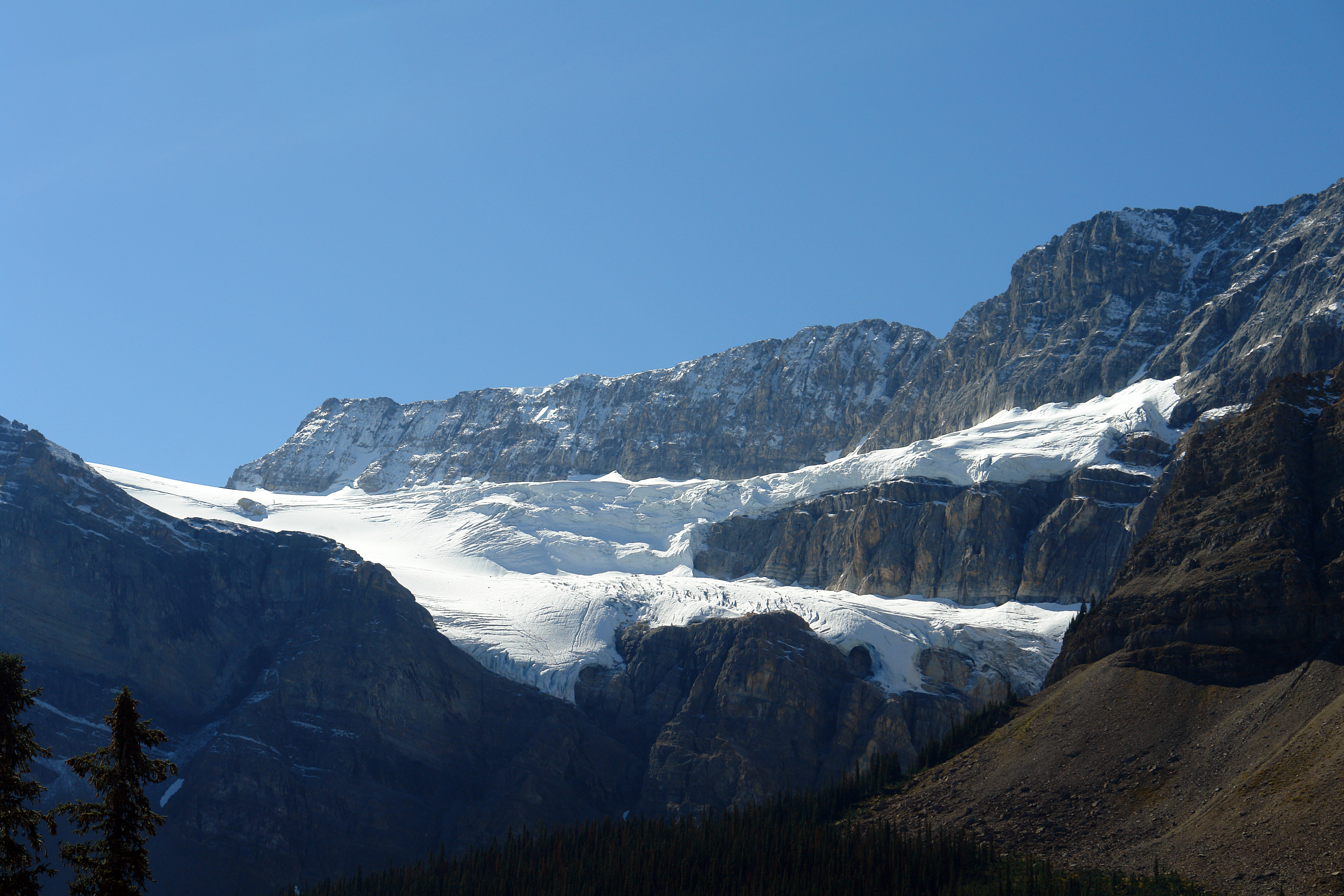
Crowfoot Glacier

The glacier was measured to be 1.5 km (0.93 mi). The Crowfoot glacier was once connected to the Wapta Icefield, and in the 1980s and was considered to be part of a smaller icefield of 5 km^{2} (1.9 mi^{2}).

== See also ==
- List of glaciers in Canada
