= Lilliput Mountain =

Mountain in Alberta and British Columbia, Canada

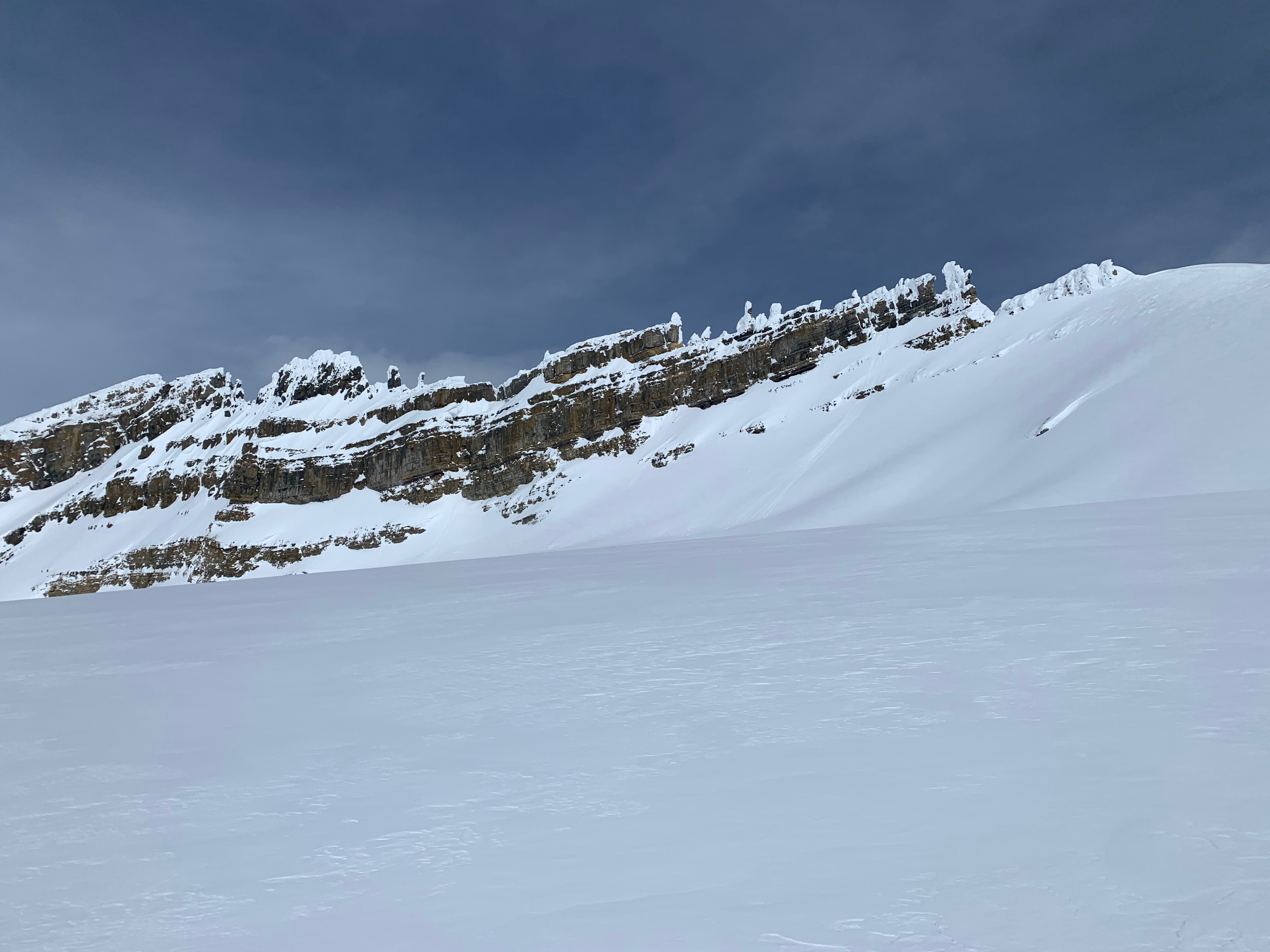
- Lilluput Mountain, from the BC side

Highest point
- Elevation: 2,925 m (9,596 ft)
- Prominence: 125 m (410 ft)
- Coordinates: 51°33′06″N 116°24′42″W

Geography
- Location within Alberta Location within British Columbia Location within Canada
- Location: Alberta; British Columbia
- Parent range: Park Ranges
- Topo map: NTS 82N9 Hector Lake

Climbing
- First ascent: 1940 A. Cox, H.F. Ulrichs

Lilliput Mountain is located on the border of Alberta and British Columbia. It was named in 1917 by the Interprovincial Boundary Survey.

== See also ==
- List of peaks on the Alberta–British Columbia border
- Mountains of Alberta
- Mountains of British Columbia
