= Bow Lake (Alberta) =

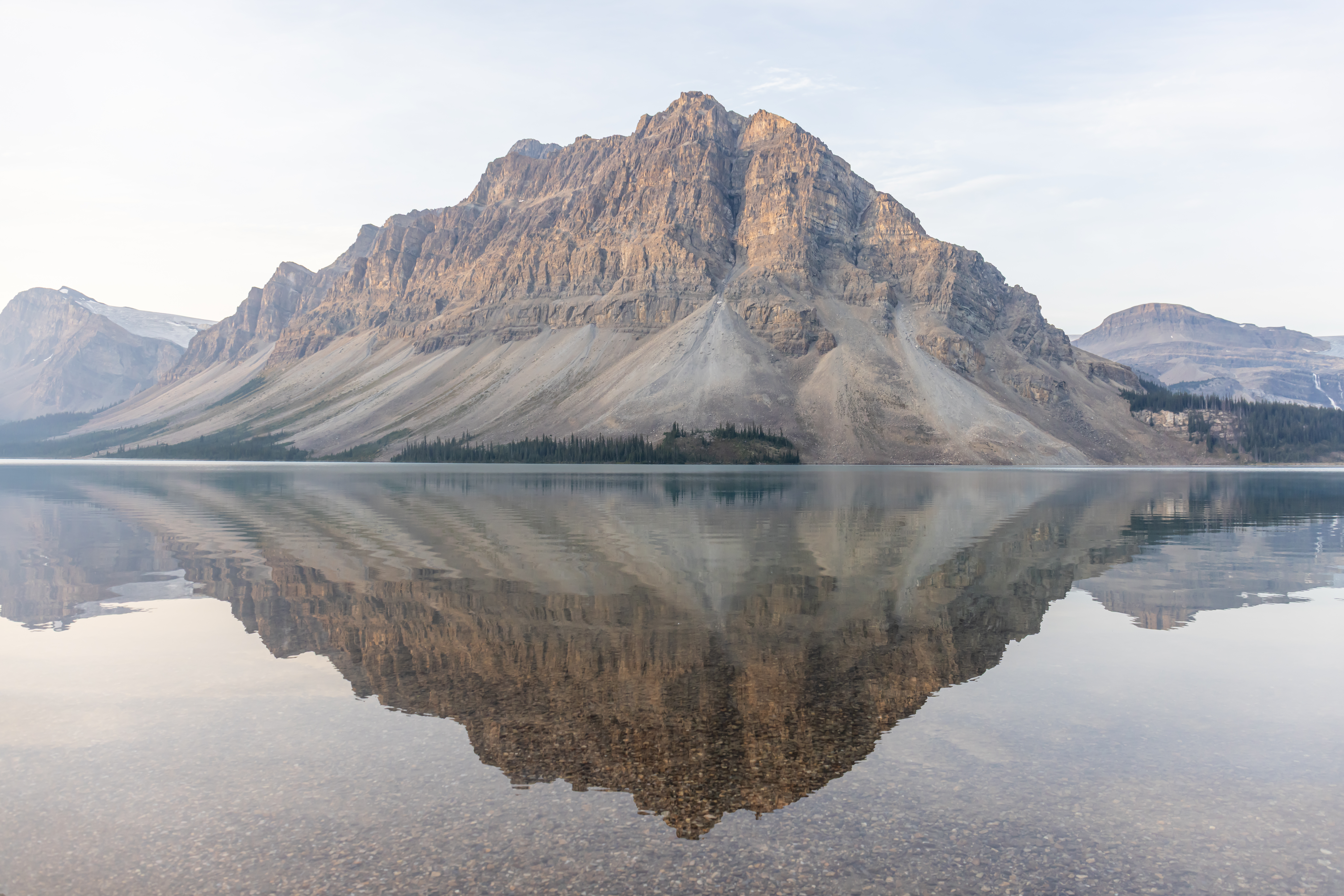
- Bow Lake and Crowfoot Mountain

- Location within Alberta
- Location: Banff National Park, Alberta
- Coordinates: 51°39′52″N 116°26′55″W
- Lake type: Glacial Lake
- Primary inflows: Bow River
- Primary outflows: Bow River
- Basin countries: Canada
- Max. length: 3.2 km (2.0 mi)
- Max. width: 1.2 km (0.75 mi)
- Surface area: 3.21 km^{2} (1.24 sq mi)
- Surface elevation: 1,920 m (6,300 ft)

Bow Lake is a small lake in western Alberta, Canada. It is located on the Bow River, in the Canadian Rockies, at an altitude of 1,920 metres (6,300 ft).

== Geography ==
The lake lies south of the Bow Summit, east of the Waputik Range (views including Wapta Icefield, Bow Glacier, Bow Peak, Mount Thompson, Crowfoot Glacier and Crowfoot Mountain) and west of the Dolomite Pass, Dolomite Peak and Cirque Peak.

Bow Lake is the closest lake to the headwaters of Bow River, and has a total area of 3.21 km^{2} (1.24 sq mi). Water in the lake is meltwater of the Bow Glacier and its turquoise colouring is due to glacial till.

Bow Lake is one of the lakes that line the Icefields Parkway in Banff National Park and Jasper National Park, other such lakes being Hector Lake, Lake Louise, Peyto Lake, Mistaya Lake, Waterfowl Lakes, Chephren Lake and Sunwapta Lake.

The historical Simpson's Num-Ti-Jah Lodge, now known as the Lodge at Bow Lake, is located on the shores of Bow Lake at the foot of Mount Jimmy Simpson.

== Ecology and Conservation ==
The cold waters of the lake are home to many cold-water fish species such as the bull trout and the westlope cutthroat trout. Both species are at high risk due to habitat changes and population densities. To protect the ecosystem, Parks Canada have laid down rules and regulations across the Bow Lake basin. Some of these guidelines include permits for water-crafts and bans on certain types of boats in order to prevent transmission of parasitic spores into the water.

The surrounding basin is inhabited by wildlife such as grizzly bears, black bears and mountain goats.

== Image gallery ==
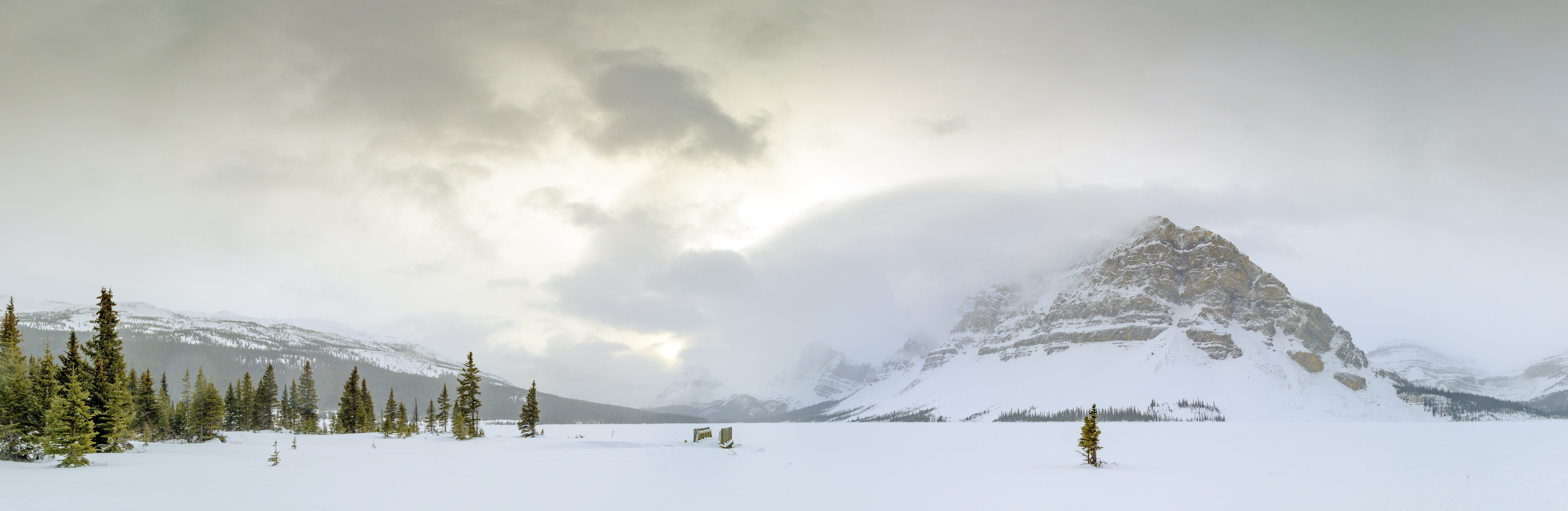
Bow Lake panorama in winter

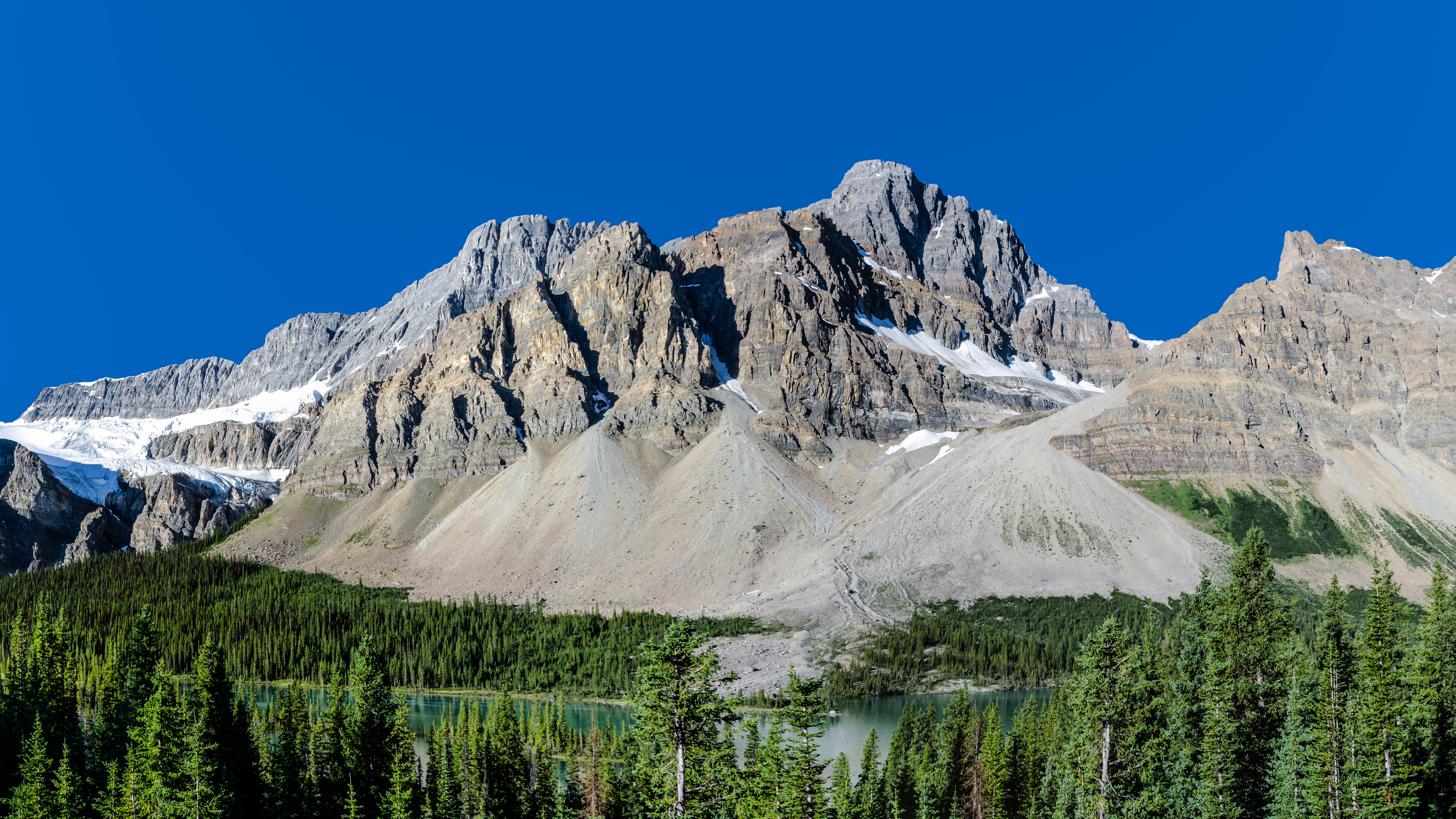
A view of Bow Lake and Crowfoot Mountain

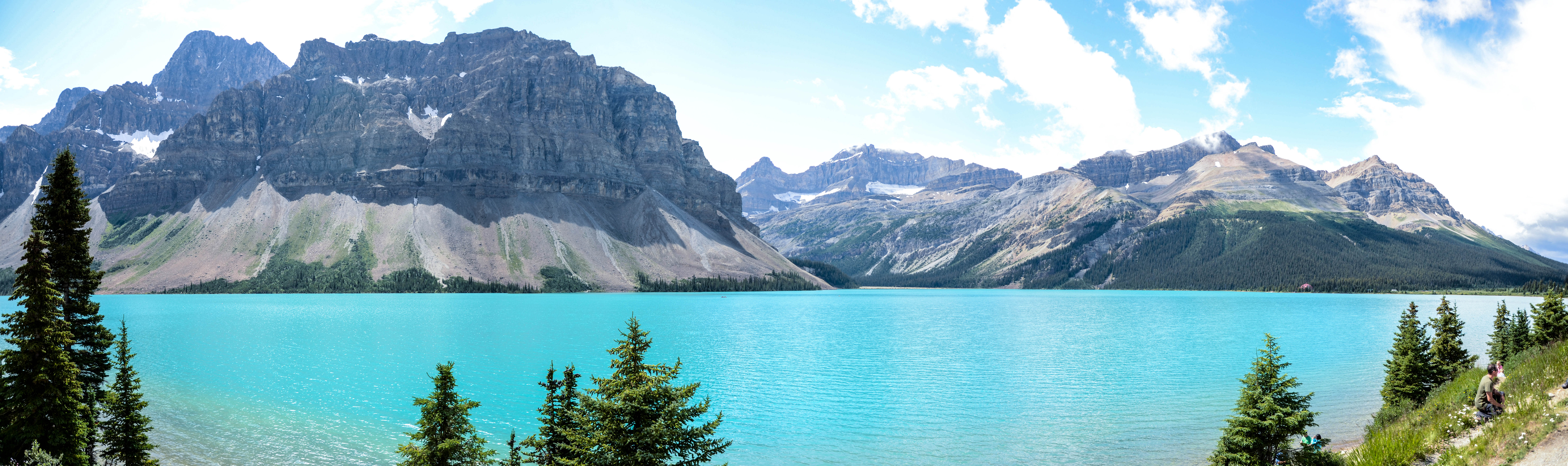
Bow Lake at a roadside turnout on Alberta Highway 93

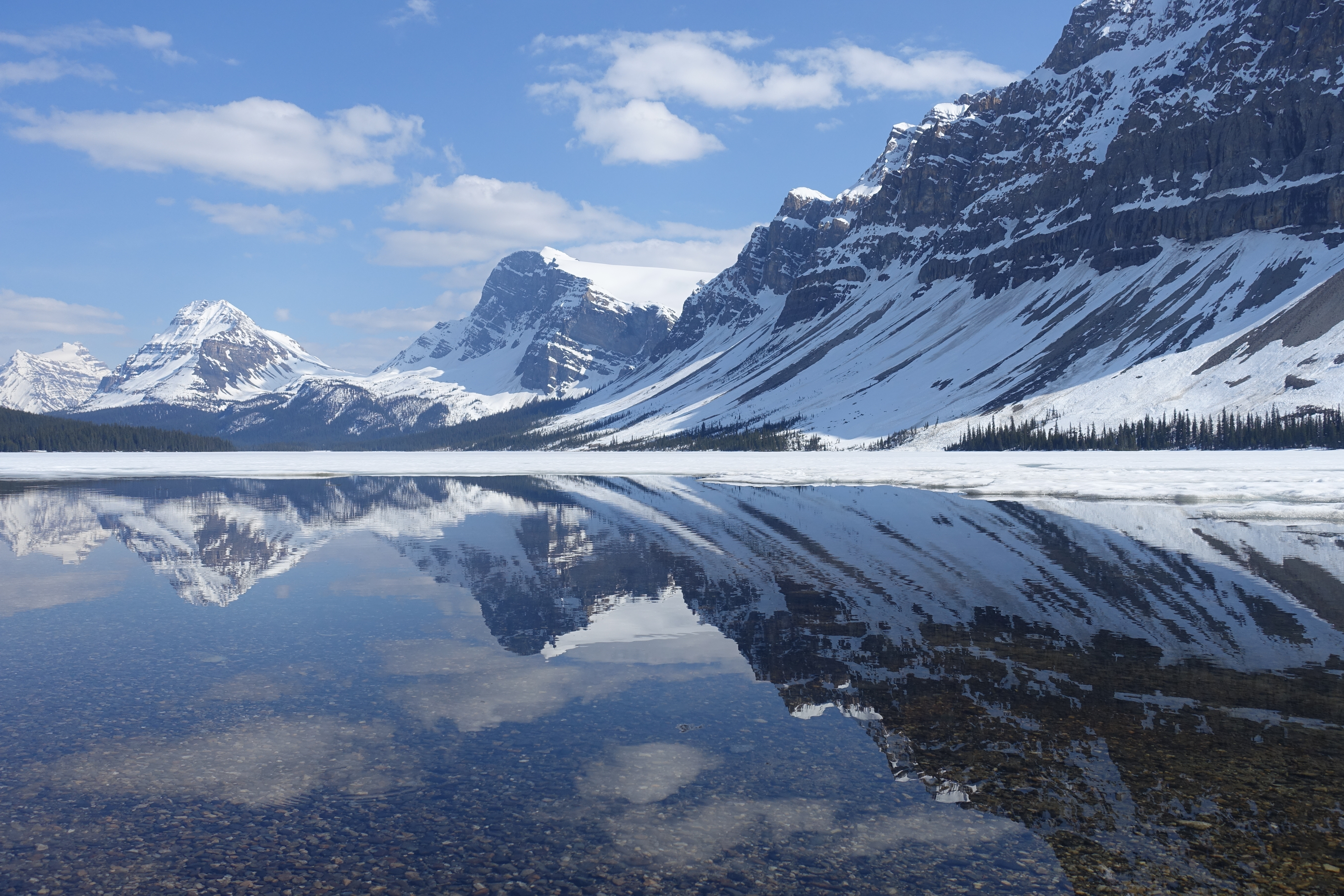
Bow Lake in late May

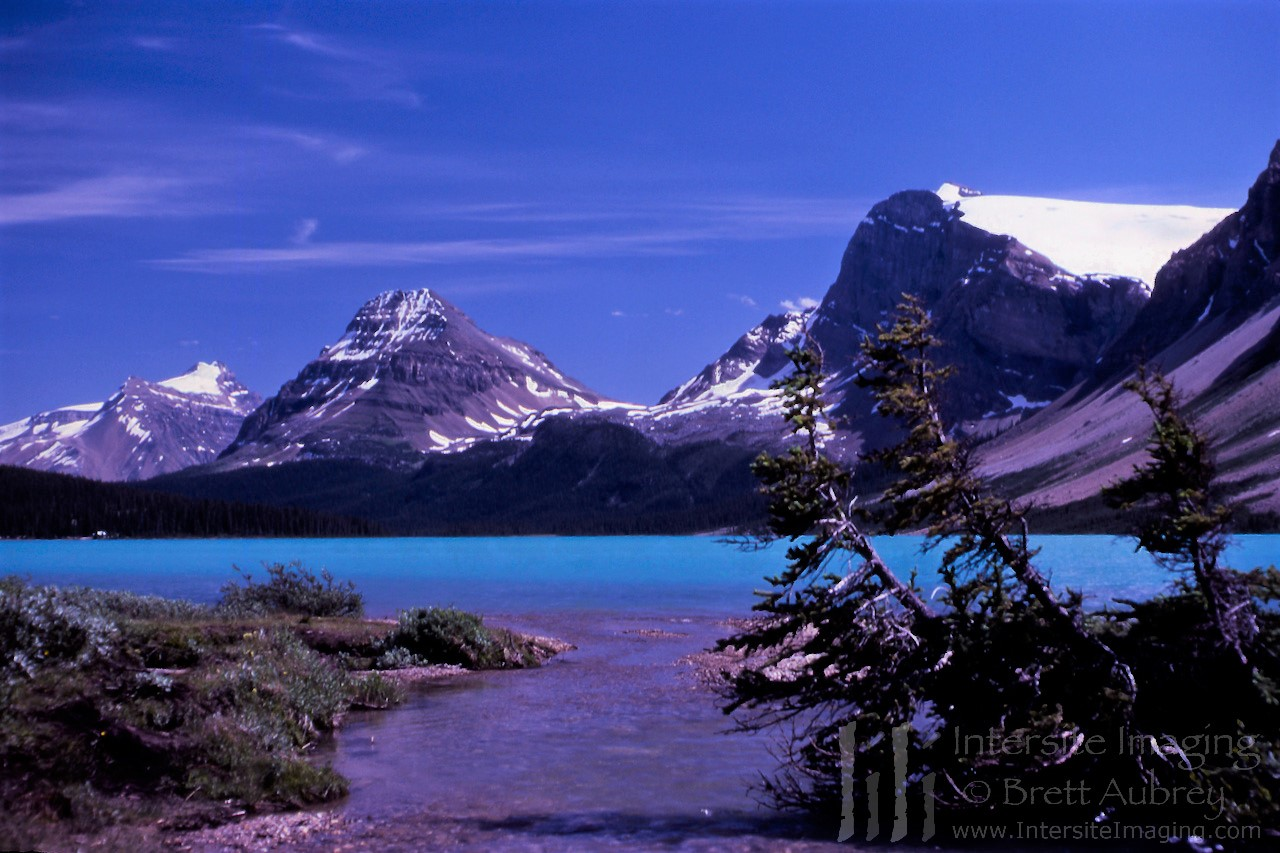
Bow Lake and Crowfoot Glacier

== See also ==
- Lakes of Alberta
