= Waputik Range =

Mountain range in Alberta/BC, Canada

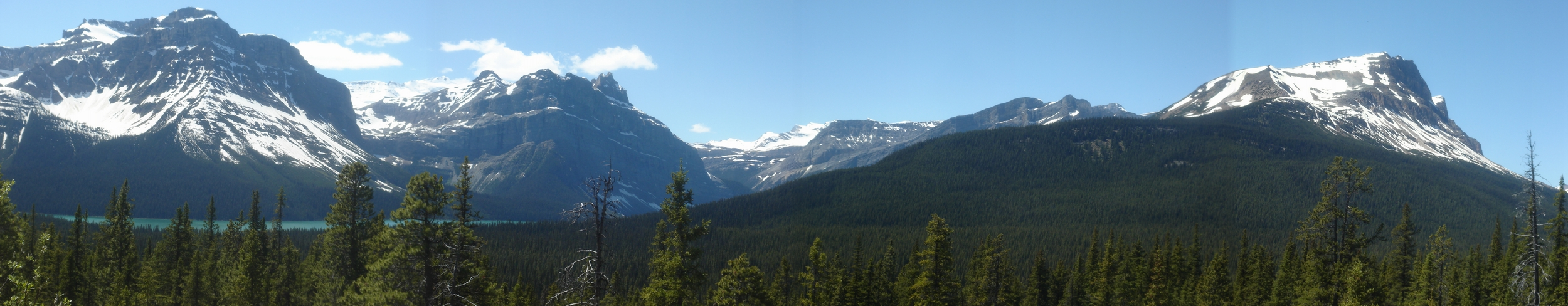
- Waputik Range seen from the Icefields Parkway

Highest point
- Peak: Mount Balfour
- Elevation: 3,272 m (10,735 ft)
- Coordinates: 51°33′55″N 116°27′58″W

Dimensions
- Length: 19 km (12 mi)
- Width: 19 km (12 mi)
- Area: 235 km^{2} (91 mi^{2})

Geography
- Location within Alberta Location within British Columbia
- Country: Canada
- Provinces: Alberta and British Columbia
- Range coordinates: 51°31′59″N 116°22′02″W
- Parent range: Waputik Mountains
- Topo map: NTS 82N9 Hector Lake

The Waputik Range lies west of the upper Bow Valley, east of Bath Creek, and south of Balfour Creek in the Canadian Rockies. "Waputik" means "white goat" in Stoney. The range was named in 1884 by George Mercer Dawson of the Geological Survey of Canada. The President Range lies within the Waputik Range.

The Waputik Range should not be confused with the much larger Waputik Mountains which encompasses this range and other peaks along the Continental Divide in Yoho National Park.

== Mountains and Peaks ==
Mountain/Peak	Height (m/ft)		Prom. (m/ft)		Location
Howse Peak	3,295	10,810	1,227	4,026	51°48′50″N 116°40′52″W
Mount Balfour	3,272	10,735	934	3,064	51°33′55″N 116°27′58″W
Mount Patterson	3,197	10,489	810	2,660	51°44′52″N 116°34′27″W
Mount Baker	3,180	10,430	480	1,570	51°39′55″N 116°35′52″W
Mont des Poilus	3,166	10,387	466	1,529	51°35′41″N 116°36′24″W
Mount Gordon	3,161	10,371	471	1,545	51°36′22″N 116°30′48″W
Caldron Peak	2,909	9,544	449	1,473	51°43′08″N 116°32′42″W
Waputik Peak	2,755	9,039	952	3,123	51°27′05″N 116°28′39″W
Pulpit Peak	2,720	8,920	140	460	51°34′05″N 116°22′05″W

== Gallery ==
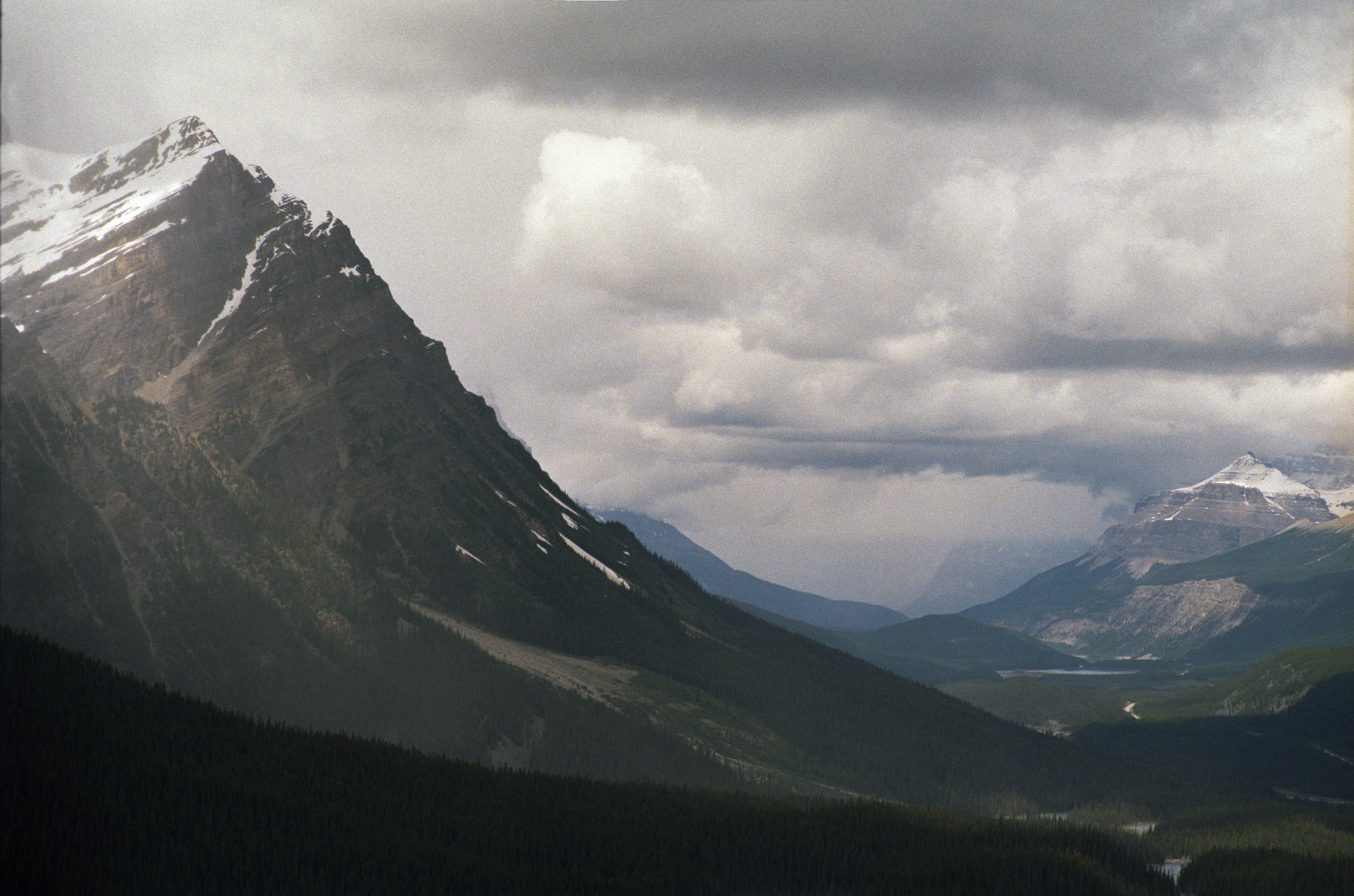
Waputik Range
