= Crowfoot Mountain (Alberta) =

Mountain in Banff NP, Alberta, Canada

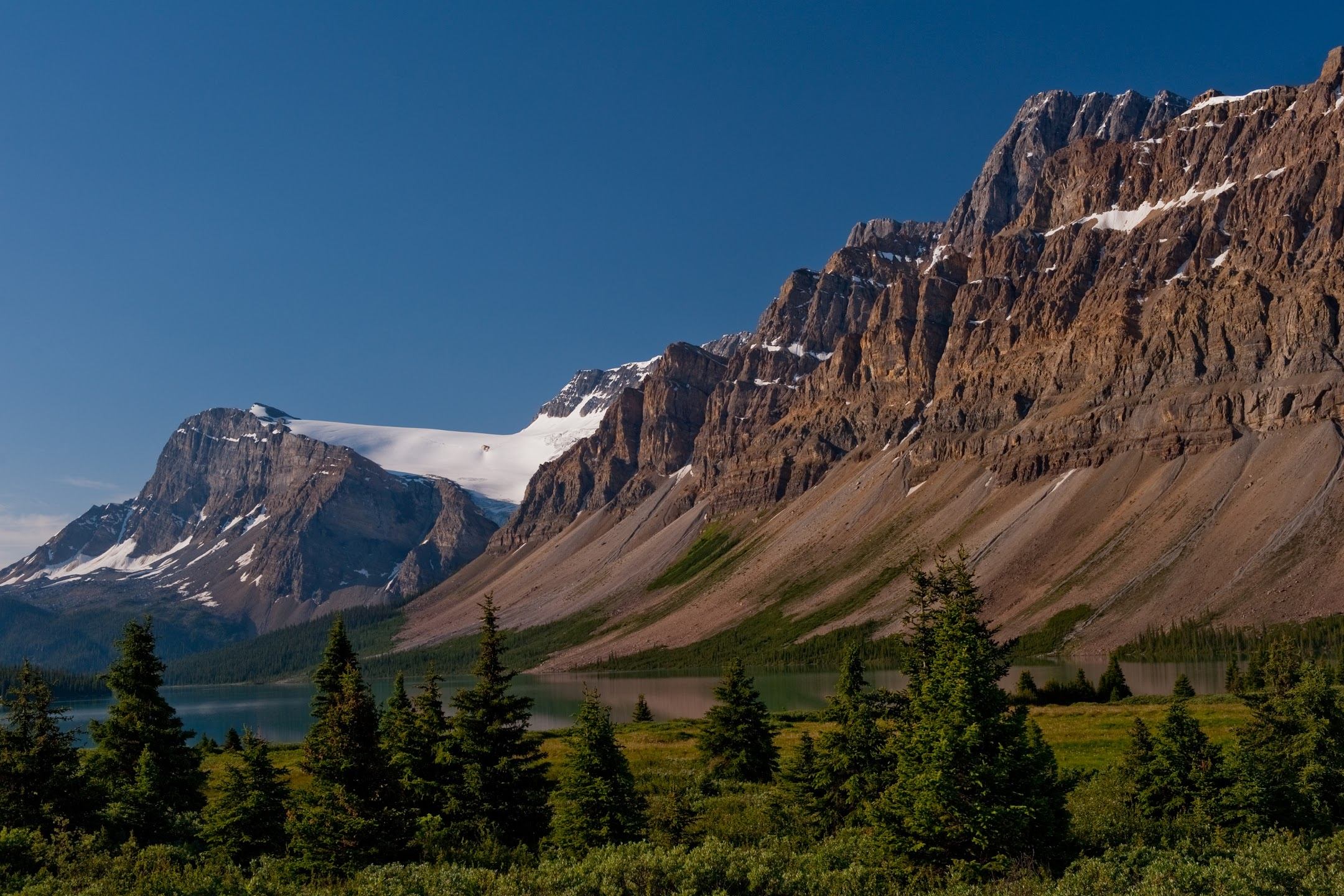
- Crowfoot Glacier and Mountain, plus Bow Lake

Highest point
- Elevation: 3,055 m (10,023 ft)
- Prominence: 355 m (1,165 ft)
- Parent peak: Mount Olive
- Listing: Mountains of Alberta
- Coordinates: 51°37′30″N 116°26′00″W

Geography
- Location within Alberta
- Interactive map of Crowfoot Mountain
- Location: Alberta, Canada
- Parent range: Canadian Rockies
- Topo map: NTS 82N9 Hector Lake

Climbing
- First ascent: 1950 by 1950 E. Cromwell and G. Engelhard

Crowfoot Mountain is a mountain within Banff National Park in Alberta, Canada. The Crowfoot Glacier sits on the northeastern flank of the mountain.

The mountain was named in 1959 after the glacier.

== Geology ==
Like other mountains in Banff Park, Crowfoot Mountain is composed of sedimentary rock laid down during the Precambrian to Jurassic periods. Formed in shallow seas, this sedimentary rock was pushed east and over the top of younger rock during the Laramide orogeny.

== Climate ==
Based on the Köppen climate classification, Crowfoot Mountain is located in a subarctic climate with cold, snowy winters, and mild summers. Temperatures can drop below −20 C with wind chill factors below −30 C. Precipitation runoff from Crowfoot Mountain drains into the Bow River which is a tributary of the Saskatchewan River.

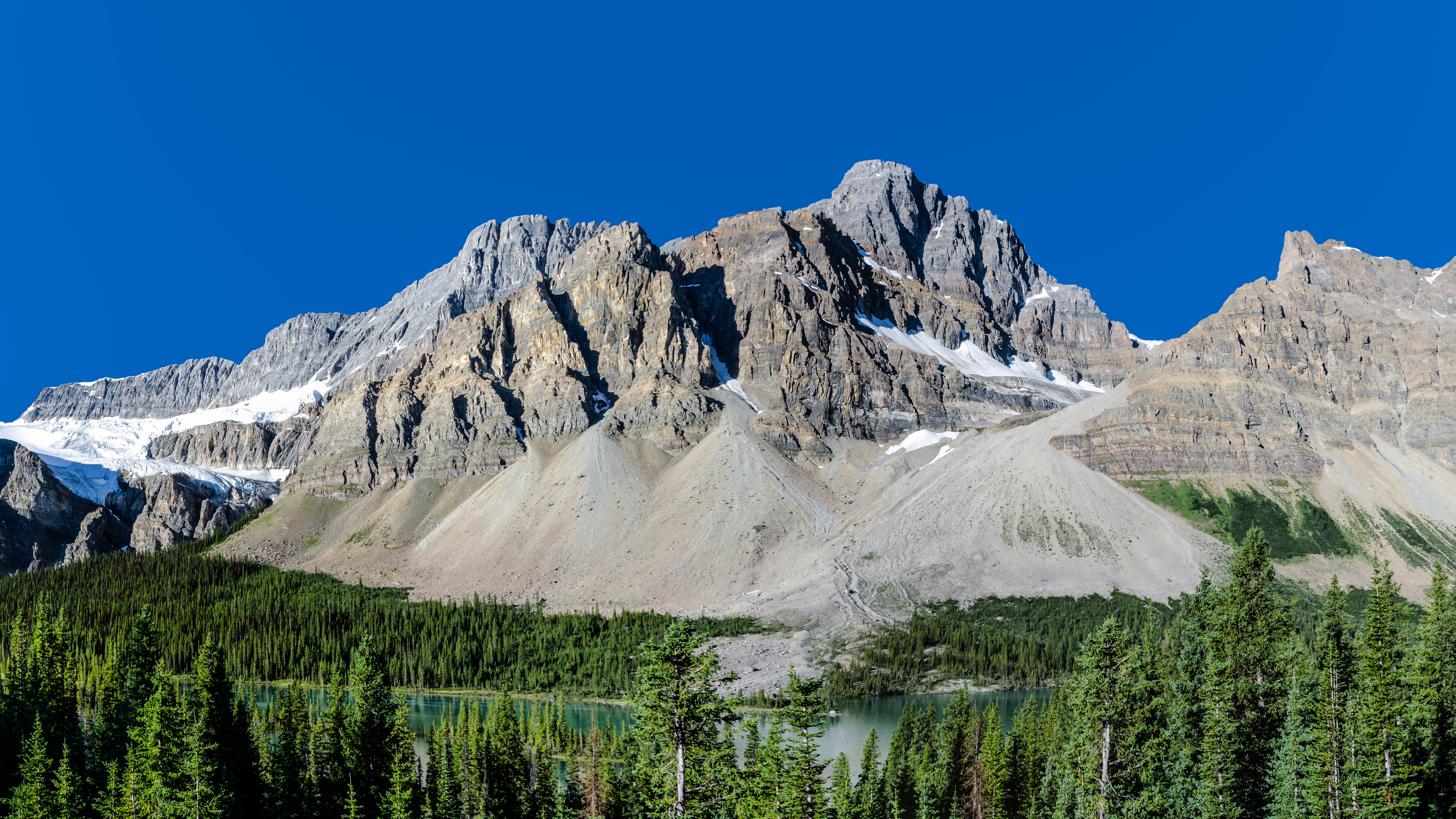
Crowfoot Mountain near Bow Lake

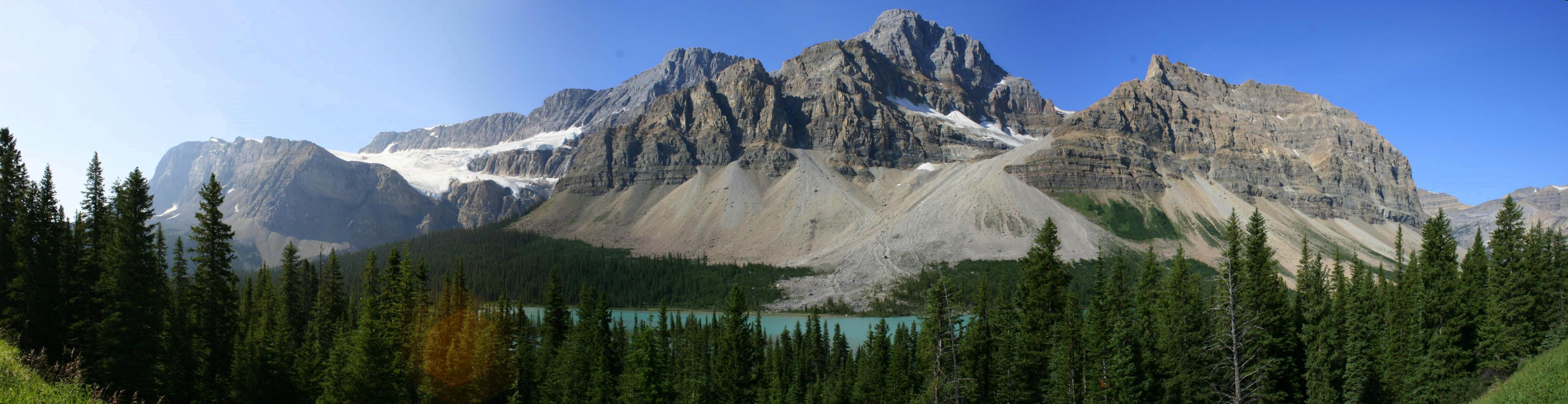
Crowfoot Mountain

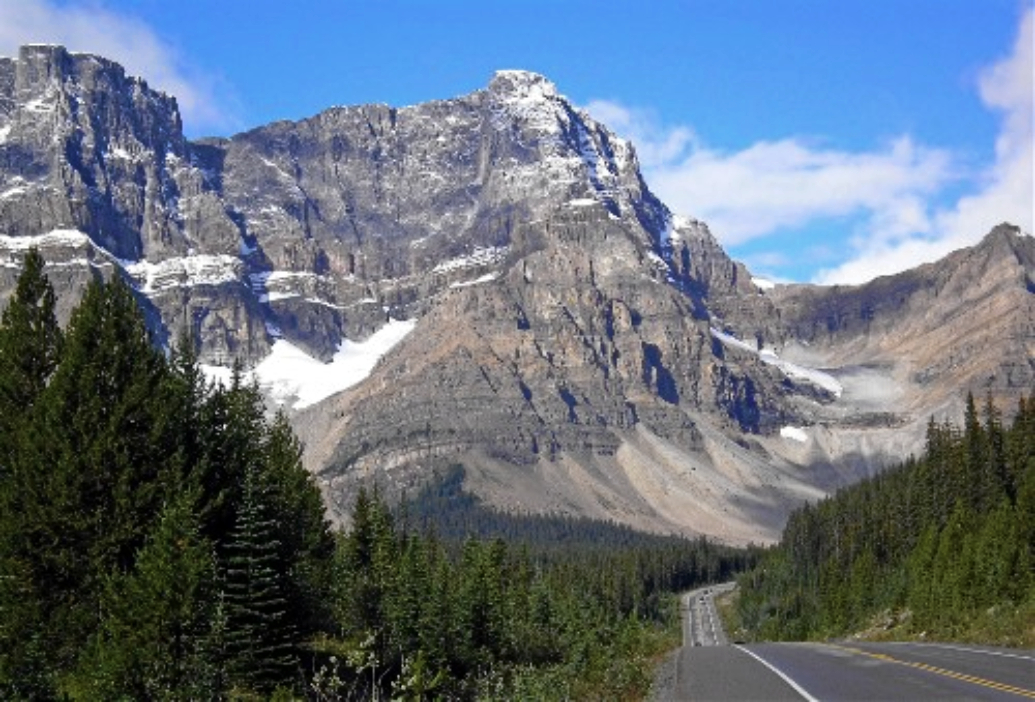
Crowfoot Mountain

== See also ==
- List of mountains of Canada
