= Hector Lake =

Lake in Alberta, Canada

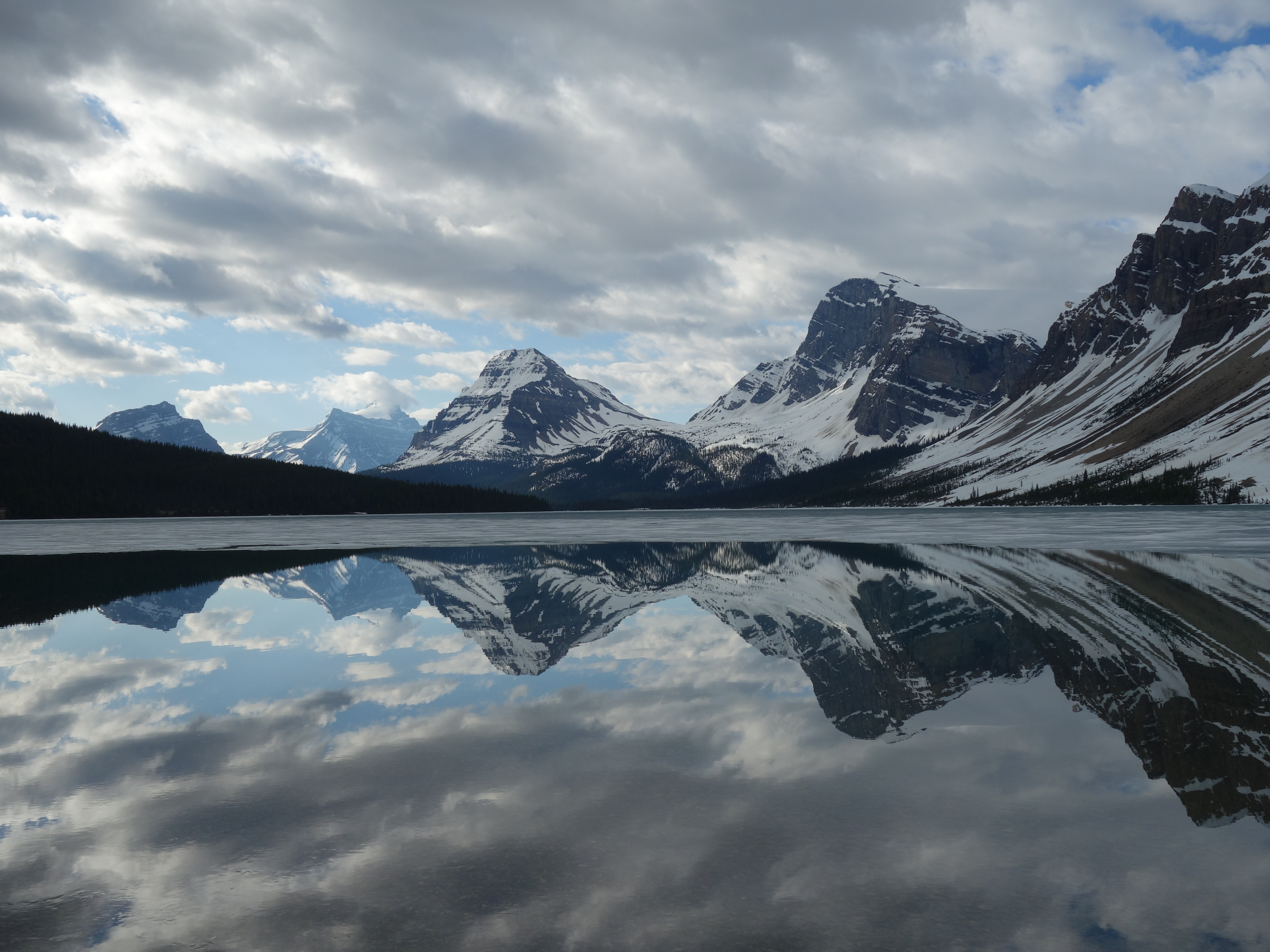
- Hector Lake in 2018

- Location within Alberta
- Interactive map of Hector Lake
- Location: Banff National Park, Alberta's Rockies
- Coordinates: 51°35′08″N 116°21′35″W
- Type: Glacial
- Primary inflows: Balfour Creek (Waputik Icefield)
- Primary outflows: Bow River
- Basin countries: Canada
- Max. length: 5.3 km (3.3 mi)
- Max. width: 1.2 km (0.75 mi)
- Surface area: 5.23 km^{2} (2.02 sq mi)
- Surface elevation: 1,800 m (5,900 ft)

Hector Lake is a small glacial lake in western Alberta, Canada. It is located on the Bow River, in the Waputik Range of the Canadian Rockies.

It is named after James Hector, a geologist and naturalist with the Palliser Expedition.

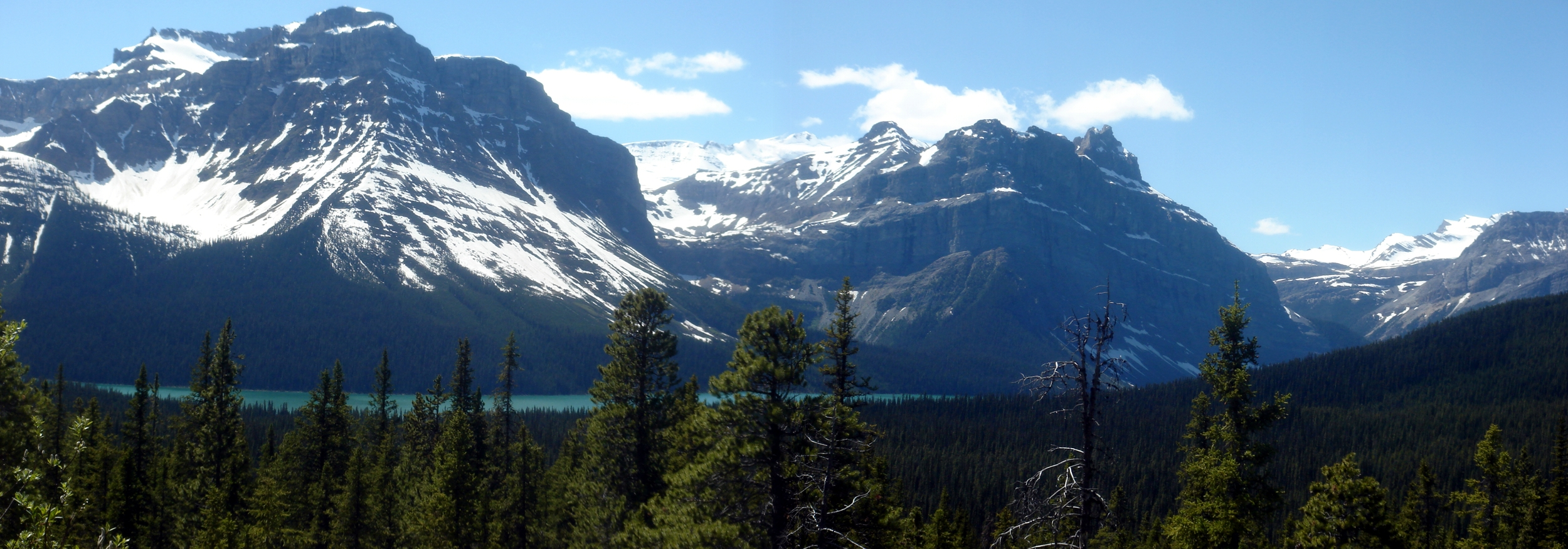
Hector Lake and Waputik Range as seen from the Icefields Parkway

The lake is formed in a valley of the Waputik Range, north of the Waputik Icefield, between Pulpit Peak, Mount Balfour, Crowfoot Mountain and Bow Peak. Hector Glacier and Mount Hector rise on the opposite side of the Bow River.

Hector Lake is one of the lakes that line the Icefields Parkway in Banff National Park and Jasper National Park, other such lakes being Bow Lake, Lake Louise, Peyto Lake, Mistaya Lake, Waterfowl Lakes, Chephren Lake and Sunwapta Lake.

Hector Lake is the second lake from the headwaters of Bow River, the first one being Bow Lake, and has a total area of 5.23 km^{2} (2.02 sq mi).
