= Chief Sitting Eagle =

Chief of the Stoney Nakoda First Nation

Sitting Eagle
- Ûbi-thka Îyodâge
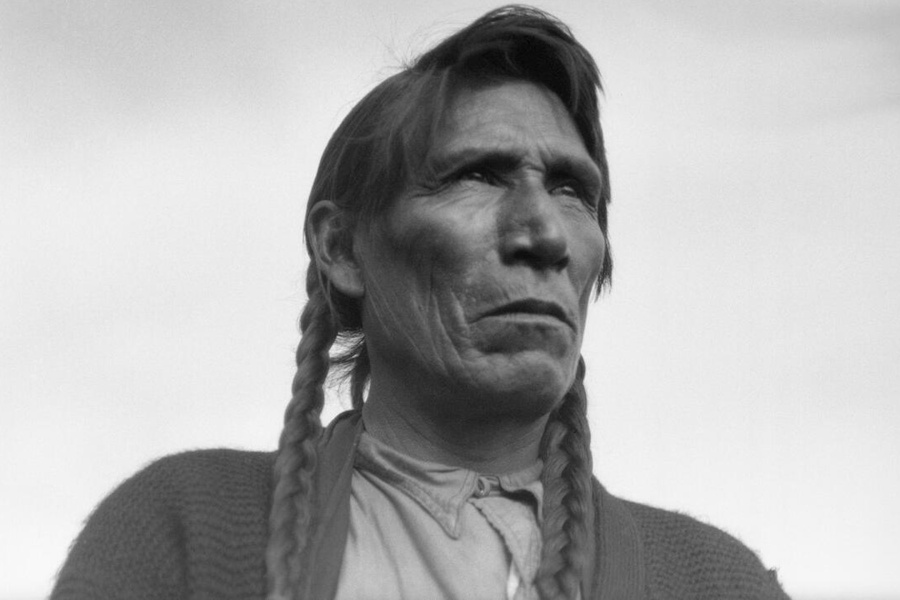
- Born: 1874
- Died: March 21, 1970 (aged 95–96); Stoney 142, 143, 144
- Burial place: Chiniki Cemetery
- Monuments: Statue, Downtown Calgary, corner of 7 Ave. and 6 St. SW
- Other names: John Hunter, Laughing Water (Îhre Wapta)
- Occupations: Rancher, artist, musician, teacher
- Known for: Cultural and diplomatic ambassadorship for the Chiniki First Nation; participation in the Calgary Stampede and Banff Indian Days
- Spouse: Leah Rider (married circa 1900)

Sitting Eagle (1874 – March 21, 1970), also known as John Hunter, was a respected Stoney Nakoda First Nation leader who spent most of his life in Mînî Thnî (formerly Morley), Alberta.

A rancher by trade, Sitting Eagle was also an accomplished teacher, hunter, artist, and craftsman. He served as an ambassador and representative for the Chiniki First Nation, appearing frequently in press coverage of the band's events and diplomatic activities. He was also a popular subject of many photographers and artists of his time, qualifying among the most photographed Stoney Nakoda individuals as a result.

In the 21st century, Sitting Eagle is best remembered for his involvement with the Calgary Stampede. Over his lifetime, he came to be regarded as a symbol of the event. A statue of Sitting Eagle stands in Downtown Calgary as a tribute to his contributions to the city.

== Early life and family ==
Sitting Eagle was born in 1874 to a Chiniki First Nation family. His parents were known by the anglicized names of George and Nancy Hunter. A 1923 article in the Calgary Herald by Chief Buffalo Child Long Lance identified George Hunter's Stoney Nakoda name as Black Dog.

=== Names ===
During Sitting Eagle's childhood, it was common for Indian agents to forcibly assign European names to Indigenous reserve residents when recording them for administrative purposes. Sitting Eagle received the anglicized name, John Hunter. He was "well known" as both Hunter and Sitting Eagle among Calgary's residents, and both names appear on his commemorative statue in Calgary.

Sitting Eagle's Stoney language name (Ûbi-thka Îyodâge) derives from the importance of golden eagles in Nakoda spiritual customs. Sitting Eagle's grandson, artist Roland Rollinmud, recalled his grandfather going by Ûbi-thka Îyodâge. Between 2014 and 2022, the Whyte Museum ran an initiative to consult elders for the purposes of identifying unnamed Indigenous people in historic photographs. Stoney Nakoda elders identified Sitting Eagle as having also gone by the name Laughing Water (Îhre Wapta), derived from the sound made by a running creek.

=== Family involvement in band government ===
Since the signing of Treaty 7 in 1877, the three Stoney Nakoda First Nations (Chiniki, Goodstoney, and Bearspaw) have separately elected one respective chief and four councillors. The band governance system was "generally imposed on First Nations without their consent." The structure ignored the ways in which Indigenous societies traditionally governed themselves.

Although Sitting Eagle was popularly referred to as a "Chief" by settler media, he did not serve as the elected chief of the Chiniki Band as recognized by the Indian Act. Nonetheless, Sitting Eagle was acknowledged to be a "prominent leader of the Chiniki" people during his lifetime, and it was not uncommon for Indigenous leaders who were not formally chiefs to be referred to as such by colonist sources. Many members of the Hunter family were noted to have served as band officials in other capacities, and a 1951 article in the Windsor Daily Star described Sitting Eagle as attending "all meetings of the band council," indicating that he served as a councillor. He was also a close friend of George MacLean (Walking Buffalo), one-time Chief of the Bearspaw Band.

Sitting Eagle's younger brother, Enos Hunter (Spotted Eagle), did serve as an elected Chief. Enos Hunter's tenure as Chief of the Goodstoney First Nation began in 1940 and ended upon his sudden death in February 1949.

== Personal life and occupations ==
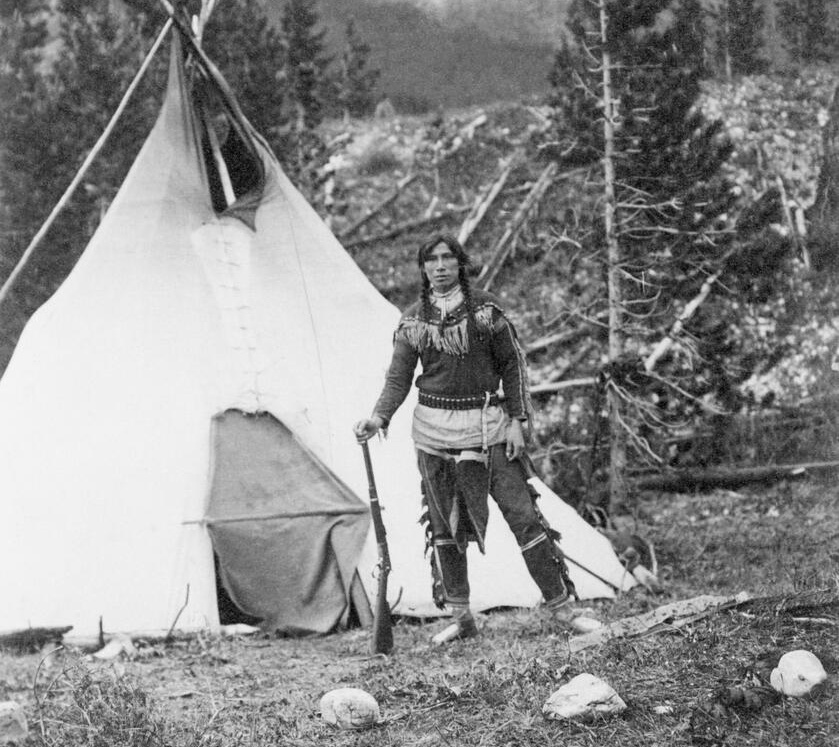
Photograph of John Hunter (Sitting Eagle) in 1902, posing with a rifle beside a tipi in Morley (today Mînî Thnî).

Sitting Eagle was married to Leah Rider, another member of the Chiniki First Nation. Leah was known to the community as Pasi, derived from the Stoney word for a female cross-cousin (Pásin). Throughout their marriage, she accompanied Sitting Eagle to events around Alberta and became a recognized public figure in her own right.

The Hunters had five children: two sons, Nathaniel and Wilfred, and three daughters, Elsie, George (Georgie), and Mary Jane. Nathaniel predeceased his parents in 1969, aged 68. John and Leah Hunter reportedly had 102 great-grandchildren.

Though primarily a rancher by trade, Sitting Eagle was also a hunter and craftsman. His work on designing and painting tipis earned him a reputation as an accomplished artist. He performed publicly as a singer and drummer. A congregant of the Methodist church on the Stoney reserve, Sitting Eagle taught Sunday school classes.

== Banff Indian Days ==
Sitting Eagle frequently participated in an annual festival known as Banff Indian Days. The festival began in 1899, when a Canadian Pacific Railway train bound for the Banff Springs Hotel was stalled by a landslide, stranding the guests. Members of the Stoney Nakoda agreed to accommodate the guests over the next several days while the blockage was cleared. The week became an ongoing event, wherein Indigenous participants hosted sporting events, dances, and songs for tourists.

The Nakoda people had been effectively displaced from the area since 1885, when the federal government established Canada's first national park, Banff National Park. Participating in the Indian Days festival was therefore an opportunity for the Nakoda to return to their traditional lands, albeit temporarily. It was also an opportunity to subvert efforts to ban Indigenous customs. The Indian Act had been amended in 1895 to otherwise prohibit the celebration of "any Indian festival, dance or other ceremony." However, the Nakoda could share only the parts of their culture that tourists expected to see, or conform to stereotypical displays that reinforced colonial preconceptions.

It was within this context that Sitting Eagle engaged in the festival throughout his life. From the mid-1930s onward, he assumed greater responsibility for organizing and sponsoring events, particularly Sun Dances. In 1965, aged 90 years old, he informed the Calgary Herald that he had been participating in the festival for "the past 60 years," suggesting that his participation began when he was around the age of thirty.

=== Subject of art and photography ===
Sitting Eagle's ongoing involvement in Banff Indian Days led to him being frequently photographed. He was a popular subject among photographers, including Byron Harmon, and often spent the week following the festival at the Banff Centre for the Arts, posing for artists and additional photographs. He was a popular subject for portrait artists, including Nicholas Raphael de Grandmaison, and his likeness was featured in several promotional campaigns for the event during the interwar period. According to the Bowstrings Heritage Foundation, he may have inspired the stone decorative panels featuring a man's face that adorn the Bow River Bridge.

==== Participation in promotional materials ====
Promotional materials for Banff Indian Days relied upon depicting Indigenous peoples as remnants of a "primitive" past, packaging their culture and traditions as a spectacle for tourists. Stoney Nakoda performers were therefore discouraged by event promoters from acting in ways that could be perceived as contemporary, and most advertisements refrained from depicting Indigenous performers with 'modern' items or clothing.

Nonetheless, Sitting Eagle was photographed in settings that subverted expectations of the time. He posed freely with tourists, which was noted by the Edmonton Journal in 1927 to upend a stereotype that Indigenous peoples were afraid of cameras. That same year, he and his wife played a game of golf with another Nakoda couple while all wore traditional dress. Photographs of the game were published internationally. Two years later, Sitting Eagle would be featured posing with a golf club in promotional photography for the festival.

=== Ceremonies of spiritual importance ===
Sitting Eagle's participation in the 'Indian Days' festival was driven by a personal mission to preserve Nakoda traditions. One such tradition was the multi-day Sun Dance ceremony. The utility of the Banff Indian Days festival as a platform for these ceremonies had become all the more significant following the 1895 amendment of the Indian Act, as the Sun Dance was one of the practices targeted by the change in law. Sitting Eagle participated in Sun Dances during Banff Indian Days. At installments of the festival during the 1920s and early 1930s, proceedings were open to the public and regarded as a novelty by white audiences. By 1937, however, attendance to Sun Dances under Sitting Eagle's direction was limited to only festival-goers whom he and other elders believed would be respectful.

== Diplomacy ==
=== 1926: Trail ride with European nobility and Lougheed family ===
To promote tourism at Banff National Park, the Canadian Pacific Railway founded the Trail Riders of the Canadian Rockies in 1923. The organization aimed to "encourage travel on horseback through the Canadian Rockies," primarily by organizing an annual high-profile trail ride through the mountain range.

In July 1926, Sitting Eagle was one of eight Indigenous leaders enlisted to lead that year's trail ride, which contained as riders Nicolò degli Albizzi, a Russian-born member of the aristocratic Italian Albizzi family, and Albizzi's cousin, Dmitri of Leuchtenberg. (Some reporting at the time erroneously identified Dmitri as the Duke of Luxembourg.)

The group also contained Dorothy Lougheed, daughter of Senator James Alexander Lougheed, and Dorothy's mother, Isabella Clarke Lougheed (née Hardisty). Isabella was herself Métis and shared her heritage with her children, though the Lougheed family would not publicly reference their roots until Isabella's grandson, Peter Lougheed, did so during his tenure as Premier of Alberta in the 1970s.

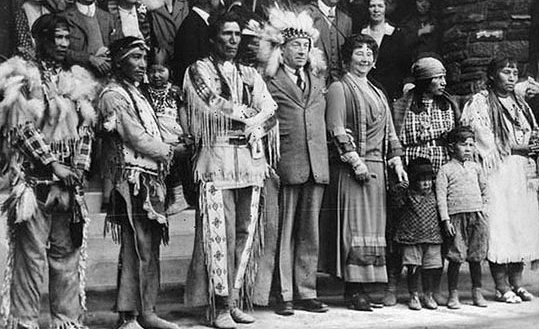
August 12, 1927. Sitting Eagle (third from left) beside Stanley Baldwin and wife, Lucy Baldwin. Also pictured is Leah Hunter, Sitting Eagle's wife (first on right).

=== 1927: Visit from Prime Minister Stanley Baldwin ===
After World War I, the Canadian government instituted a series of policies that undermined Indigenous rights, such as selling reserve lands to non-Indigenous veterans without the consent of a band council. Indigenous activists therefore began to raise support and awareness on the world stage. In this vein, the Stoney Nakoda maintained a practice of making non-members honorary chiefs. This practice, though legitimate, was also an opportunity to leverage media attention, elevating awareness of the Nakoda people while fostering strategic alliances.

In July and August 1927, Edward VIII (then Prince of Wales) and Prince George embarked upon a royal tour to Canada, accompanied by then-Prime Minister of the United Kingdom, Stanley Baldwin. On August 12, Baldwin and accompanying dignitaries were received at the Banff Springs Hotel by a Chiniki delegation including Sitting Eagle. After welcoming the group, Sitting Eagle granted Baldwin the title of honorary chief, conferring upon Baldwin his own name. (In 1919, during an earlier visit to the Stoney Nakoda, Prince Edward had received a similar honour.)

Baldwin's investiture by Sitting Eagle made international headlines. Most coverage was positive, but some media outlets, and Baldwin's political rival Ramsay MacDonald, capitalized on the event to deride Baldwin. In November, the Manchester Guardian "satirically" questioned whether Baldwin would apologize on behalf of Five Nations representatives for their alleged recent criticism of white politicians, as Baldwin's honorary title meant he was a "member" of the Nations himself. Instead, Downing Street issued a statement that Baldwin did not find the matter amusing, for he had been "very much affected" by his interactions with Sitting Eagle and his sympathies lay with the Indigenous peoples. Baldwin kept the traditional Chiniki clothing and items he received from Sitting Eagle at his personal home in England until his death in 1947.

=== 1929: Investiture of Dorothy Lougheed ===
On January 1, 1929, Sitting Eagle granted honorary Nakoda membership to Dorothy Lougheed, whom he had lead on a trail ride through the Rockies in 1926. Noted to be a rare honour for a woman at the time, she received the name of "Thunder Bird."

== Activities in Calgary ==
=== Calgary Stampede ===
The Calgary Stampede is a rodeo, exhibition, and festival held every July, established in its current form in 1912. From at least 1924 onwards, Sitting Eagle frequently attended Stampede festivities. Events he participated in included horse racing, rodeo exhibitions, and parades. He and his wife Leah received particular recognition for their sense of fashion, receiving several "best dressed" awards between them. By 1951, he had become closely enough associated with the Stampede that a cachet of his likeness was added to all letters mailed that year from the post office on the Stampede's grounds.

=== Relationship with Calgary's arts community ===
Sitting Eagle's frequent interactions with artists led to several important friendships within Calgary's artistic community, including Gerda Christoffersen. A Calgary-based Danish artist, Christoffersen was renowned in North America for her portraits of Indigenous subjects in the twentieth century. She was also a vocal proponent of Indigenous rights. Sitting Eagle and his wife adopted Christoffersen in 1946, and she maintained a seasonal studio at the Banff Springs Hotel until at least 1967.

In 1949, Sitting Eagle invited Christoffersen to become one of the first two white women permitted to participate in the Sun Dance. The other participant was Christoffersen's friend, Olga Valda, who owned a ballet school in Calgary that Christoffersen attended. After meeting Sitting Eagle and other attendees, Valda became a champion of Indigenous causes until her death in 1973. She left her estate to the Students' Union of the University of Calgary to create scholarships, with preference given to undergraduates of Indigenous descent.

== Filmography ==
Sitting Eagle appears in a cameo role in the 1922 silent movie, The Valley of Silent Men, which was filmed in Banff. The area was a popular location for film production throughout the 1920s, spurred on by promotional activity around the Canadian Pacific Railway.

== Death and legacy ==
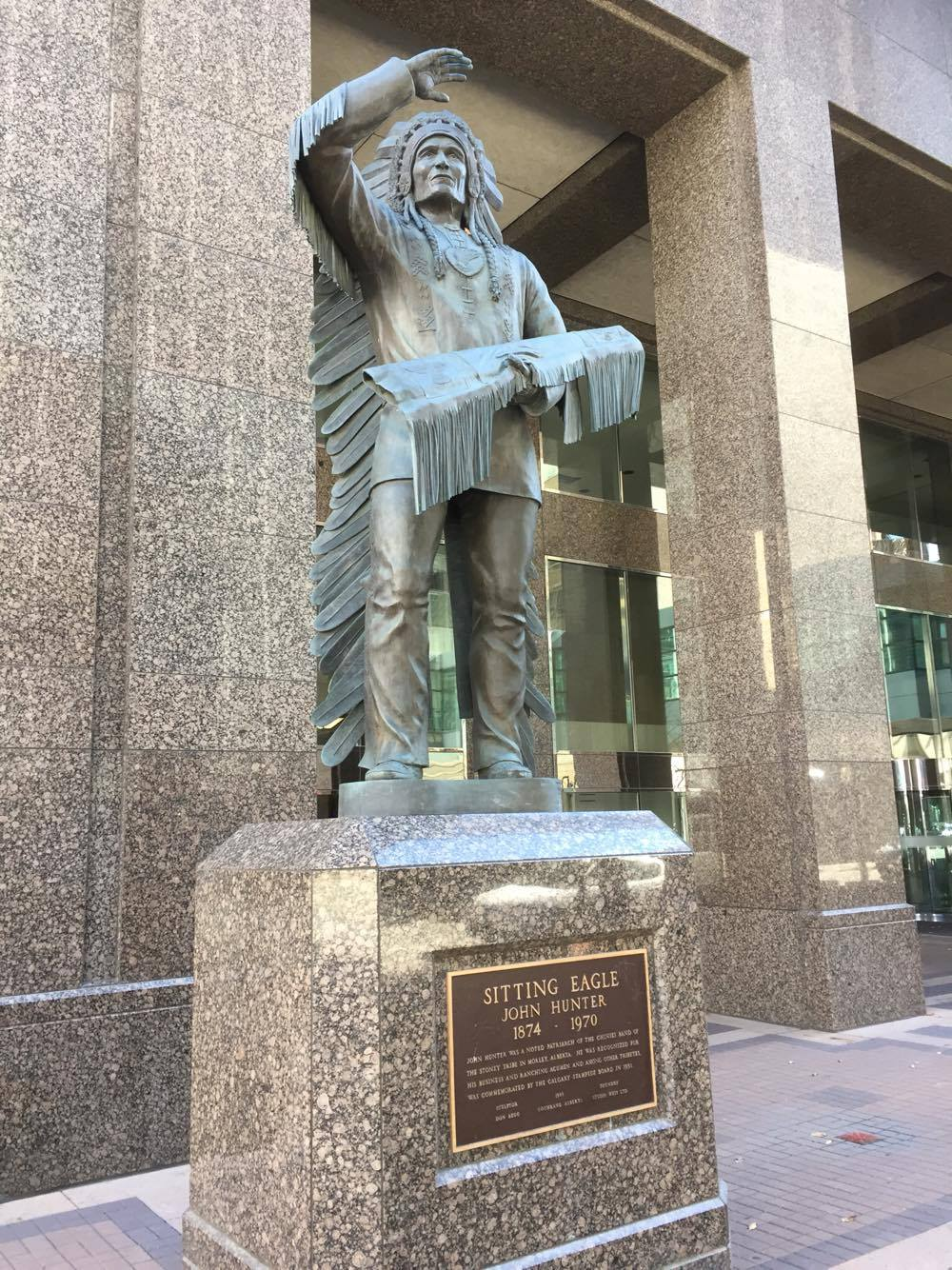
Statue of Chief Sitting Eagle in Downtown Calgary, Alberta

Sitting Eagle died on March 23, 1970, aged 96. He was survived by his wife, Leah, their son Wilfred, and two daughters. Leah Hunter died shortly afterwards on May 12, 1970, after a brief illness.

In December 1987, the Calgary Planning Commission recommended that a statue of Sitting Eagle should be introduced to the corner of 6th Street and 7th Avenue. The Calgary Visual Arts Board oversaw the installation of the $250,000 bronze statue, created by Cochrane-based sculptors Don and Shirley Begg.

Shirley's father, Doug Stephens, was also an artist who had met Sitting Eagle and photographed him in 1949. The Beggs used these photographs for inspiration when creating the tribute to Sitting Eagle. The statue was unveiled on November 30, 1988. The unveiling was attended by Stoney Nakoda Chief John Snow and Elder Lazarus Wesley, as well as then-Mayor of Calgary Ralph Klein, Grant MacEwan, and Don Begg.
