= Nora Drummond =

- Born: Nora Drummond; 1862; Bath, Somerset
- Died: 1949 (aged 86–87); Vancouver Island, British Columbia
- Known for: Painting, Illustration
- Spouse: Daniel Joseph F. Davies (m. 1893; died in 1948)

Nora Drummond (1862-1949), also known as Norah Drummond and Norah Drummond-Davies, was an English, and later Canadian, artist and illustrator, whose work typically featured dogs and country pursuits.

== Life ==
Nora Georgina Drummond was born in Bath, Somerset in 1862 She was a member of an artistic family, her father being a former Master of the Bath School of Art and Design and an art tutor to the Royal Family, and her mother the daughter of the artist James Hardy (1801-1879). Her maternal uncle, James Hardy Jr (1832-1889), was a painter of rustic landscapes and hunting scenes, who exhibited regularly at the Royal Academy and the British Institution. Another uncle, Heywood Hardy (1842-1933) was also an artist, specialising in animals and landscapes.

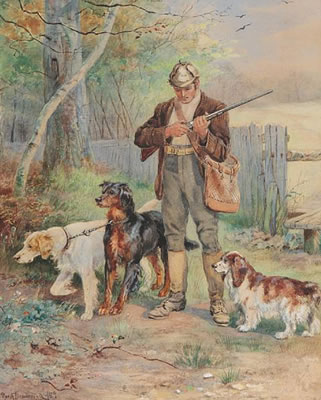
The Gamekeeper

In 1893 Drummond married Daniel Joseph F. Davies (1870-1948) and shortly after the turn of the century the couple emigrated to Canada, where at least three of Drummond's siblings joined them. For some years they lived in Alberta, where she provided private lessons in painting and illustration to Peter Whyte, who later, with his wife, (see Peter and Catharine Whyte) became the inspiration for the Whyte Museum of the Canadian Rockies in Banff, Alberta.

== Works ==
Although Drummond was working as an artist prior to the end of the 19th century (she is described as such in the 1891 and 1901 censuses), the aspect of her work most widely encountered comprises the illustrations, often featuring dogs and country pursuits, that she produced for Raphael Tuck & Sons Ltd., a British publishing company with interests in the US and Canada, well known before World War II for its extensive range of art postcards. Her younger sister, Eileen Drummond (b. 1884) also provided illustrations for Tuck postcards. After her marriage she continued to sign her work "N. Drummond".

Drummond exhibited with the Island Arts and Crafts Society.

Drummond died in 1949 on Vancouver Island, British Columbia. Her works are in the collection of the New York Public Library and the Whyte Museum.
