= Peter and Catharine Whyte =

Twentieth-century Canadian artists

Peter and Catharine Whyte in Banff, Alberta, Canada, c. 1932

Peter (1905–1966) and Catharine Whyte (1906–1979) were twentieth-century Canadian artists from Banff, Alberta, known for their landscape paintings of the Canadian Rockies. Their paintings and extensive collection of regional artifacts formed the genesis of what would later become the Whyte Museum of the Canadian Rockies. The Alpine Club of Canada dedicated the Peter and Catharine Whyte Hut on the Peyto Glacier after the couple.

== Peter in the Canadian Rockies ==
Peter Whyte was born on January 22, 1905, in Banff, Alberta, Canada, the son of Dave White, a dry goods merchant from Banff who once worked as a Canadian Pacific Railway section man at Sawback, near Banff. Peter's mother, Annie Curren White, was the daughter of John Donaldson Curren, who worked as a coal scout and painter. Dave White developed friendships with some of the traveling Stoney Indians, whose ancient hunting trail ran near White's Sawback section house.

Growing up in Banff, Peter enjoyed various outdoor activities and sports, including skiing, hiking, and horseback riding. He also showed an interest in art, and soon learned to paint from local artists. The rugged beauty of the mountains and the larch-filled valleys inspired him to sketch and paint the world around him. He eventually considered painting as a career. Belmore Browne, an outdoorsman and painter, and Nora Drummond-Davis, an illustrator, provided Peter with private lessons in painting and illustration.

Peter learned landscape techniques from studying the work of Belmore Browne, Aldro T. Hibbard, Carl Rungius, and the Group of Seven painter J. E. H. MacDonald. MacDonald visited Lake O'Hara in 1924 and returned every year to paint. Peter accompanied MacDonald on many of his outings, painting alongside the famous artist. In 1925, Peter painted with Aldro T. Hibbard, who encouraged him to enroll at the School of the Museum of Fine Arts in Boston. It was here in 1925 that Peter Whyte first met Catharine Robb.

== Catharine in New England ==
Catharine Robb was born on June 13, 1906, in Concord, Massachusetts, and raised in an affluent household. Her father, Russell Robb, studied engineering at MIT and quickly became senior vice-president and treasurer of a successful engineering firm. Her mother, Edith Morse Robb, ran a successful embroidery design company.

During summer vacations in Seal Harbor, Maine, Catharine dated John D. Rockefeller III for a time. In December 1924, Catharine made her social debut at Boston's Hotel Somerset, but New England's high society did not interest her. Inspired by her mother's artistic interests, Catharine began her art education at the School of the Museum of Fine Arts in 1925.

== Love and education ==
In late 1925, Catharine Robb met a quiet, dark-haired Canadian named Peter Whyte, who she described in one journal entry as "a Scotch friend". Together, they pursued a fairly traditional course of study, which included anatomy, figure drawing, and portrait painting.

What began as a casual friendship between the two art students slowly grew into a more intimate relationship, as they discovered their shared views on religion, philosophy, and life. Between semesters, Peter returned to Banff to work for the Brewster Transport Company, writing long letters to Catharine. When Catharine's father died in February 1927, Peter provided comfort and support. During this time, Peter openly declared his feelings for Catharine, and by the spring of 1928, Catharine reciprocated.

After graduating from the School of the Museum of Fine Arts in 1929, Peter proposed to Catharine, and she accepted. During their long-distance engagement, Peter travelled to Japan, China, Hong Kong, Hawaii, and Italy, working on steamships to pay his way. He wrote long love letters to his fiancée during this period.

== Life in the Canadian Rockies ==
On June 30, 1930, after Catharine completed her course of study, Peter and Catharine were married beneath an apple tree at the Robb estate before 300 guests. They moved to Banff that August and lived with Peter's parents. In May 1931, they moved into a rustic log home and studio they built between Banff and the Bow River. The couple spent significant time together hiking in the mountains and painting at Lake O'Hara, Lake Louise, Skoki Valley, Bow Lake, Mount Assiniboine, Yoho, Wenkchemna Pass, and the Banff area. They created striking landscape paintings of the mountains, lakes, glaciers, and larch trees.

Since her formal training did not include landscape painting, Catharine studied and learned from her husband. Together, they often painted in the company of outstanding artists. Contemporaries Carl Rungius, Belmore Brown, and J. E. H. MacDonald provided a strong influence with their theories and use of color.

Peter and Catharine committed themselves totally to their art, leading them at times to study remote mountain areas, unique landscapes, and the dramatic skies of Western Canada. Peter’s work often incorporated obscure mountain views with somber mystic hues of blues, browns, and greens. Catharine’s sketches often focused around rays of light and swirling clouds. Together, their life’s work produced a consistent and distinct sense of place.

In the early 1930s, the young couple, along with Peter's older brother and other members of the Ski Club of the Canadian Rockies, constructed a lodge in the remote Skoki Valley region northeast of Lake Louise. In 1932, Peter and Catharine took over management of Skoki Ski Lodge. The following years were happy ones. The Whytes enjoyed the company of friends, the majesty of the landscape around them, and the outdoor world that offered them so much. Their home served as a gathering place for visiting artists and friends.

In 1933, tragedy struck when one of their Skoki Lodge guests, MIT mathematician Dr. Raymond Paley, died in an avalanche on Fossil Mountain after wandering off alone, despite warnings by the Whytes. Although found innocent of any responsibility, Peter took the accident very hard.

== World travel ==
To escape the painful memories of Skoki, Peter and Catharine traveled to Chicago, San Francisco, and then on to Hawaii, where they spent several months living in a beach-front bungalow on Hanalei Bay, Kauai. They fell in love with the Hawaiian climate, people, and culture. They painted numerous Hawaiian landscapes and several portraits of locals they met during their stay.

In 1934, they set out from Hawaii on an extensive world tour that took them to Japan, China, Bali, Java, Sumatra, France, England, Germany, and the Swiss Alps. The young couple enjoyed painting and sketching side by side, capturing a beautiful Japanese landscape or the smiling faces of Bali children. When painting and sketching became difficult, Peter focused his energies on photography, recording the many places they visited. After eighteen months of travel, Peter and Catharine finally returned home to North America in the fall of 1934.

Travel had always played an important role in their creative life together, providing both a sense of adventure and inspiration for their art. In 1938, they set out again on a trip to Switzerland, Norway, and Scotland. They returned from their travels early, however, due to the growing tensions in Europe.

== War years ==
At the outbreak of World War II, Peter enlisted in the reserve army and reported for basic training duty with the Calgary Highlanders at Sarcee Camp. He worked as a photographer, taking ID pictures and other menial tasks. In April 1944, Peter entered a painting in an art contest, winning a $50 second prize for his effort. More important than the money, Peter Whyte was named an Official Second World War artist. The Group of Seven painter A. Y. Jackson was on the committee that appointed him to his new position.

During the war years, Catharine became a member of the Red Cross and donated considerable time and money to supporting the soldiers. She sent many packages over to the soldiers in Europe. Catharine's brother left his high-paying job in Boston to enlist in the army.

As a war artist, Peter was given considerably more autonomy, traveling from post to post, capturing the army life on canvas. While serving as a war artist, Peter created over 50 paintings to support the war effort. He was discharged on November 10, 1944.

== Later years ==
Throughout the 1950s and 1960s, Peter and Catharine traveled extensively and continued to paint and draw. They dedicated their lives primarily to painting the Canadian Rockies, and to collecting local art and historical material. They enjoyed entertaining their numerous friends, who regularly stopped over for tea, conversation, and laughter.

Catharine's responsibilities managing their home took precedence over her painting. She did not create a major painting after 1939. She once wrote: "I have decided that life is a balancing of things. If you want one thing you have to give up another, you just can't have or do all you want, and it means trying to figure out which of the alternatives to choose. Peter and I have our life into the kind where we work as a team and we do practically everything together. We like it that way and feel we do better doing things together."

In 1952, Peter was diagnosed with cataracts in both eyes. Complicated by an ongoing bout with alcoholism, Peter struggled for the next six years, trying to paint everything he could while the eyes could still see. After a second cataract operation, Peter continued to produce large canvases of the Stoney peoples, many of which ended up in the Luxton Museum established by Norman Luxton.

In 1958, Peter and Catharine formed a foundation (originally named Wa-Che-Yo-Cha-Pa) to ensure the survival of their collection. This decision led to the amazing collection that would become one of the more important in North America.

Following Peter's death on December 3, 1966, Catharine began a new life on her own, focusing her energies on community, travel, and conservation. She also rediscovered her passion for skiing, which reintroduced her to a life of youthful enthusiasm. At the age of 63, she received her pilot's license from the Chinook Flying School. She became an important patron of the arts, providing significant financial support to the Banff Center. Catharine also gave significant funding to the I.D.E.A. project, Intercultural Development and Education through the Arts. She continued to support the Stoney people, both financially and through her support of their arts and crafts. In 1970, the Stoney people honoured her by making her a blood sister and giving her the name Princess White Shield.

In her later years, Catharine Whyte received many honors, including an Honorary Doctorate from the University of Calgary in 1969, Outstanding Citizen of the Year by the Banff Kiwanis Club in 1969, and the Award of Merit from the Historical Society of Alberta in 1978. That same year, she received Canada's highest civilian honor, the Order of Canada.

Catharine Whyte died of cancer on March 7, 1979, in Banff, Alberta, Canada. She was 72 years old.

== Legacy ==
In 1968, a museum was constructed with Peter and Catharine Whyte's collection forming the centerpiece. Catharine remained actively involved with the museum for the rest of her life. After Catharine’s death, the Whyte Museum of the Canadian Rockies was named in their honor and expanded to include two heritage homes, including the Whyte home, and four log cabins.

In commemoration of the 50th anniversary of the founding of the Whyte Museum, a large exhibition curated by Anne Ewen was unveiled in 2018 titled Artistry Revealed: Peter Whyte, Catharine Robb Whyte and Their Contemporaries. The exhibition was accompanied by a book.

Today, the Whyte Museum of the Canadian Rockies occupies a 4-acre (16,000 m^{2}) site by the Bow River, and is one of the most important museums dedicated to the art and culture of the Rocky Mountains. It serves as a beautiful legacy of two people who loved the Canadian Rockies and its people.

The Skoki Ski Lodge was designated a National Historic Site of Canada in 1992.

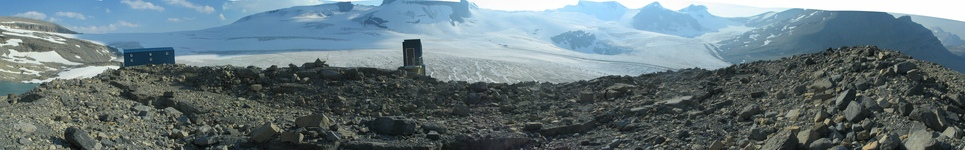
Peter and Catherine Whyte Hut and the Peyto Glacier, 2005

== Sources ==
- Christensen, Lisa (1999). A Hiker's Guide to Art of the Canadian Rockies. Calgary: Fifth House. ISBN 978-1894004398.
- Mayberry, Kim (2003). Romance in the Rockies. Canmore: Altitude Publishing Canada. ISBN 978-1551539980.
- Sanderson, Kay (1999). 200 Remarkable Alberta Women. Calgary: University of Calgary Press. ISBN 978-0968583203.
- Whyte, Jon (2002). Mountain Glory: The Art of Peter and Catharine Whyte. Banff: Whyte Museum of the Canadian Rockies. ISBN 978-0920608319.
