= Whyte Museum =

Museum in Alberta, Canada

- Whyte Museum of the Canadian Rockies
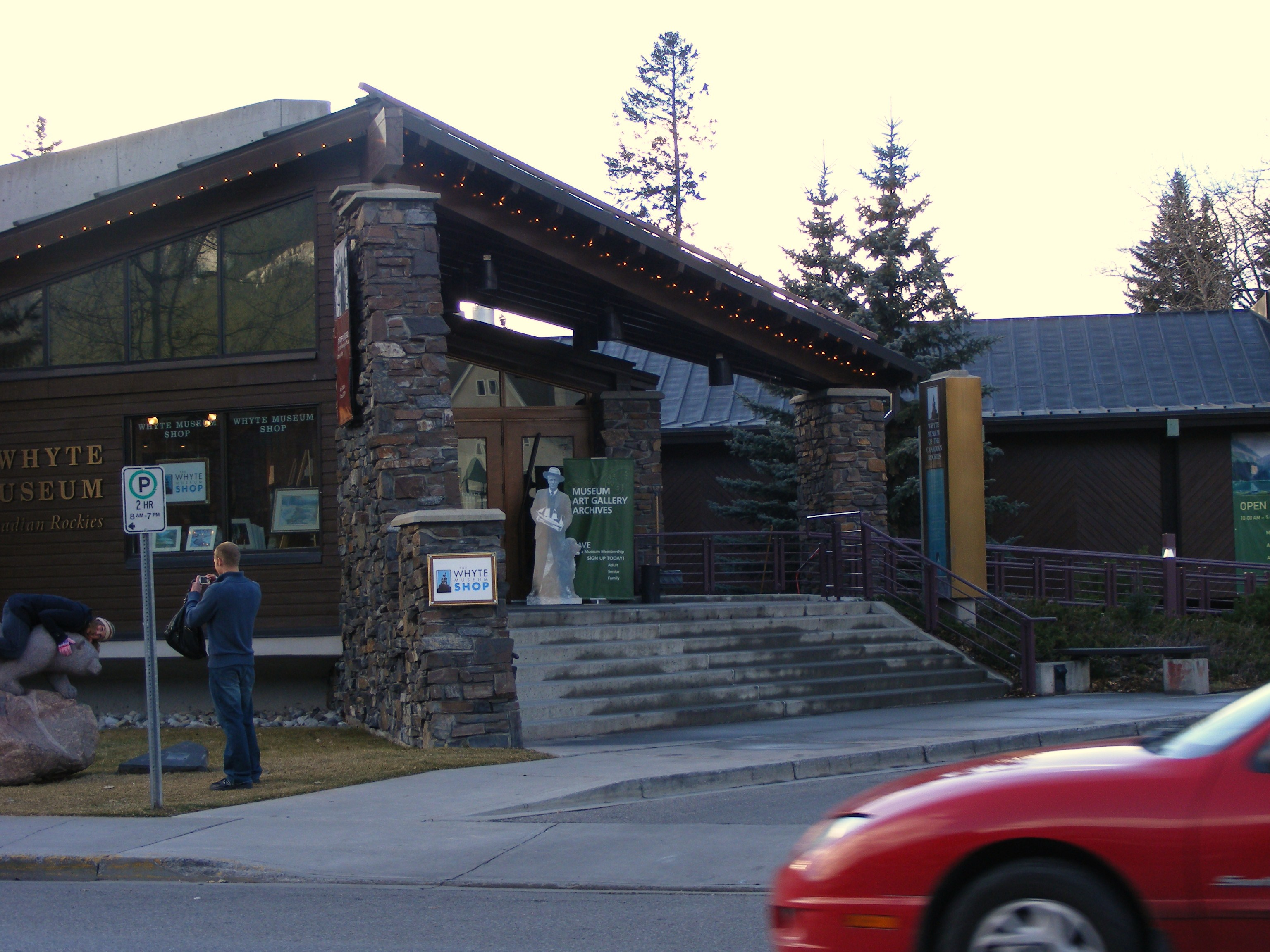
- Established: 1968
- Location: 111 Bear Street, Banff, Alberta, T1L 1A3, Canada
- Coordinates: 51.175224°N 115.573120°W
- Type: Historic Museum
- Collection size: approx. 17,500 objects in art and heritage objects (not including archives)
- Website: www.whyte.org
- 29,000 sq ft

The Whyte Museum of the Canadian Rockies is located in Banff, Alberta, Canada. The museum collects, preserves, and exhibits materials related to the cultural heritage of the Rocky Mountains of Canada, making them available for education as well as research. The museum, which contains an archive and a library, was the inspiration of Banff artists Peter and Catharine Whyte. The Alpine Club of Canada has dedicated the Peter and Catharine Whyte Hut on the Peyto Glacier after the couple.

The Whyte Museum of the Canadian Rockies is the fourth largest cultural history museum in Alberta. The Museum opened in 1968 and houses the Art Galleries, Archives, Heritage Gallery and Museum Shop. The four-acre site also includes two historic log homes, that can be visited during the summer, and four log cabins.

== History ==
The museum was opened on June 16, 1968, by the Peter and Catharine Whyte Foundation. The Archives of the Canadian Rockies was the starting point of the museum and the Banff Library was incorporated in the Whyte Museum in 1970. The exhibition space saw several expansions during the 1980s and a new facility was opened in 1993. The museum acquires and exhibits art and artifacts from the Canadian Rockies, aiming to showcase the culture and history of the Rocky Mountains of Canada. Many of Byron Harmon's photographs, pioneer photographer of the Canadian Rockies, are housed at the museum.

=== Founders ===
Peter and Catharine Whyte met at the Boston Museum of Fine Arts. Peter was a typical "Banffite", he participated in all the activities the area offered such as skiing, hiking, horseback riding, etc. He was also an artist and had learned much by accompanying artists who came to Banff in the early 20th century, including Carl Rungius, Aldro Hibbard, and J.E.H. MacDonald. He drove tour buses and limousines for the Brewster Company. Catharine was born and raised in Concord, Massachusetts to a fairly affluent family. Her father had been the treasurer and Vice President of the Stone & Webster Engineering Firm and her mother was a business woman in the 1890s. Her grandfather, Edward Sylvester Morse, had been the first director of the Peabody Museum in Salem. Her affluent lifestyle gave her a great childhood, but she was looking something more in her life. Peter and the Canadian Rockies offered her that; Catharine was a free spirit, and she believed in happiness over material goods. Peter and Catharine were married in 1930, and moved to Banff to start their lives together. Catharine fell in love with Pete's mountains quickly. Their first summer they dedicated to painting wilderness and First Nations people, and in the autumn they arranged with Earl Spencer to build their log home studio, still located today on Museum property.

=== Peter and Catharine Whyte Foundation ===
Founded and initially endowed by Peter and Catharine in 1958, the Foundation originally had a broad base of interests. As well as acting as an agency for collecting and preserving the culture of the Canadian Rockies, the Wa-Che-Yo-Cha-Pa Foundation supported medical research and Native education. Peter and Catharine's extensive collection of artifacts and historical materials formed the nucleus of what became known as the Archives of the Canadian Rockies. Catharine increased the Foundation's endowments in 1971 and renamed it in honour of Peter who died in 1966. The Peter Whyte Foundation ceased to give money to other causes and used all of its income to support the new building which now housed the archives, gallery and library. Catharine Whyte, founder, benefactor and President of the Foundation died in 1979. The endowment was increased through her bequest and the remainder of the historic and artistic collections, including the Whyte and Moore homes, were left to the Foundation, which was renamed the Peter and Catharine Whyte Foundation.

=== Expanded museum ===
In 1993 a new wing was added to the Whyte Museum to help it meet its full potential as a cultural tourism generator. The new wing added 13,000 square feet to the existing 16,000 square foot building, which was renovated at the same time the addition was completed. The construction and renovation project increased exhibition and public space, provided expanded storage space and conservation work areas, and expanded the Museum Shop and administration areas. The new building allowed the Museum to continue to collect, preserve and exhibit its growing collections.

== Collections ==
=== Heritage Collection ===
The Heritage Collection includes artifacts relating to Aboriginal people, artists, immigrants, guides and outfitters, climbers, surveyors, hikers, explorers, adventurers, skiers and residents of the town and area.

=== Art collection ===
The Whyte Museum's art collection spans the early 1800s to present day and includes regionally created and related works by Canadian and international artists.

Prominent/Notable Artists and Collections:

- A.Y. Jackson
- Franz Johnston
- Charles Comfort
- Charlie Beil
- Aldro Hibbard
- Carl Rungius
- Frederic Marlett Bell-Smith
- Mary Vaux Walcott
- Margaret Shelton
- Nicholas Raphael de Grandmaison
- Mary T. S. Schäffer Warren
- Nicholas Morant

== Heritage homes ==
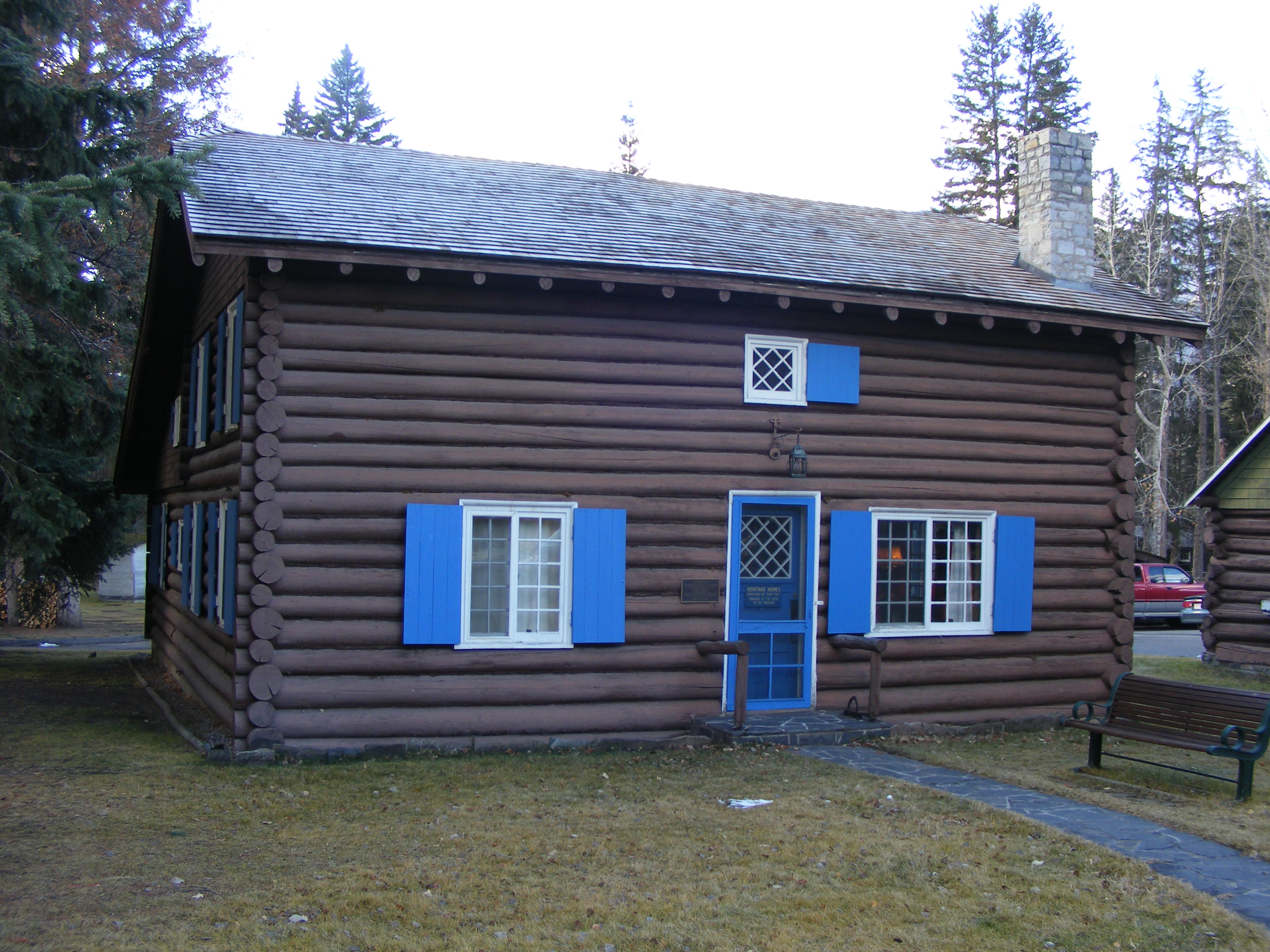
Moore residence, Lynx Street, Banff

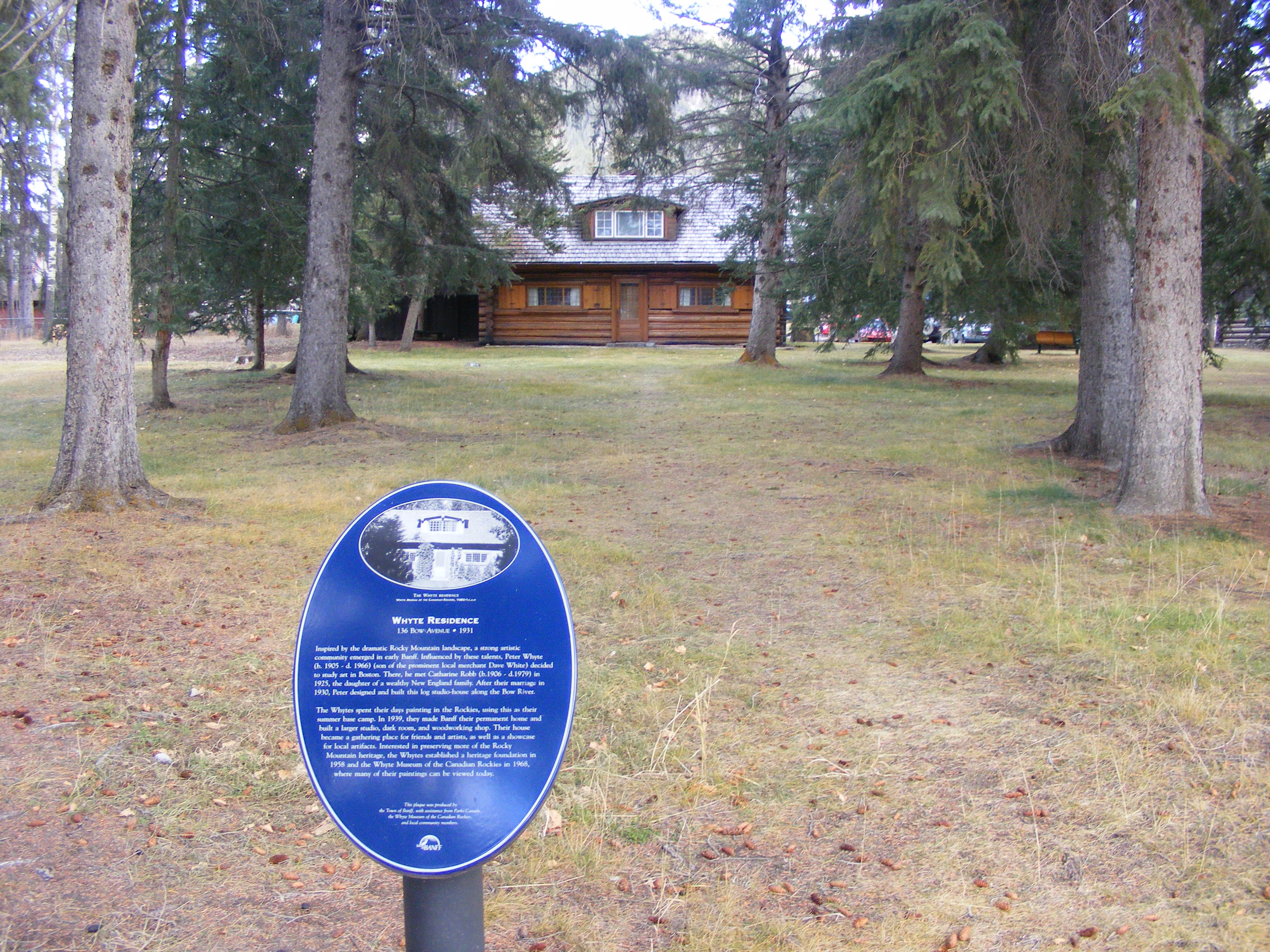
Whyte residence, Bow Avenue, Banff

There are six homes on the property of the Whyte Museum. Two are available for entry during the summer tour season (the Moore home and the Whyte home), and the other four cabins are only able to be seen on the outside. These historic homes work to represent the lifestyle of Banff's earlier pioneers and the people who helped to shape the community and land into what it is today. They are aimed at preserving significant examples of Banff's earlier architectural styles and homes associated with some of the area's more noteworthy residents.

=== Moore home ===
The Moore home is the home of collectors and community leaders Philip and Pearl (Brewster) Moore. The house was built in 1907 on Fox Street and was later donated to the Whyte Museum in 1971, leading to its transplant onto museum property. It belonged to Philip and Pearl Moore, who were early pioneers of the area and worked to preserve a lot of Banff's earlier history.

=== Whyte home ===
The home of Peter and Catharine (Robb) Whyte, the Museum's founders, philanthropists, world travellers and visual artists. The Whyte home was built in its current location in 1930-31 just after Peter and Catharine were married. It was originally meant to be a summer home, but as time went by it turned into a year-round residence.

=== Peyto cabin ===
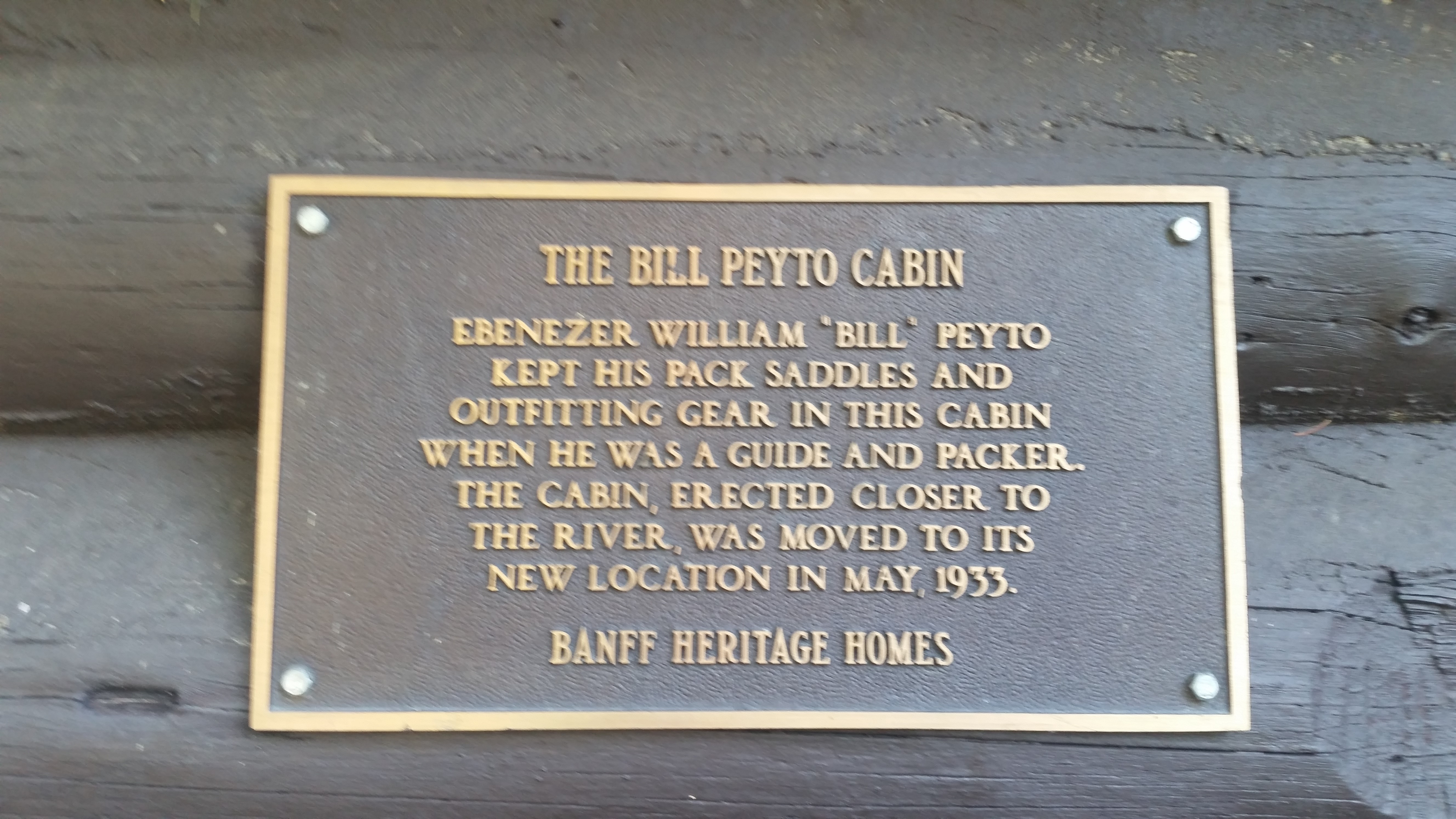
Bill Peyto Cabin

Welcoming visitors to the town of Banff is the face of the legendary guide Bill Peyto. Ebenezer William Peyto came to Banff from England in the early 1890s. Peyto, a prospector, hunter-trapper, warden and guide, used this cabin to store his outfitting and trapping supplies. With Peyto's cabin as well as those of Jack Sinclair, Jimmy Simpson, and Fred Ballard, this property by the Bow River became Banff's outfitting and guiding center. In the 1930s Peter and Catherine Whyte moved the cabin closer to their house and used it to house their Stoney friends while painting portraits.

=== Sinclair cabin ===
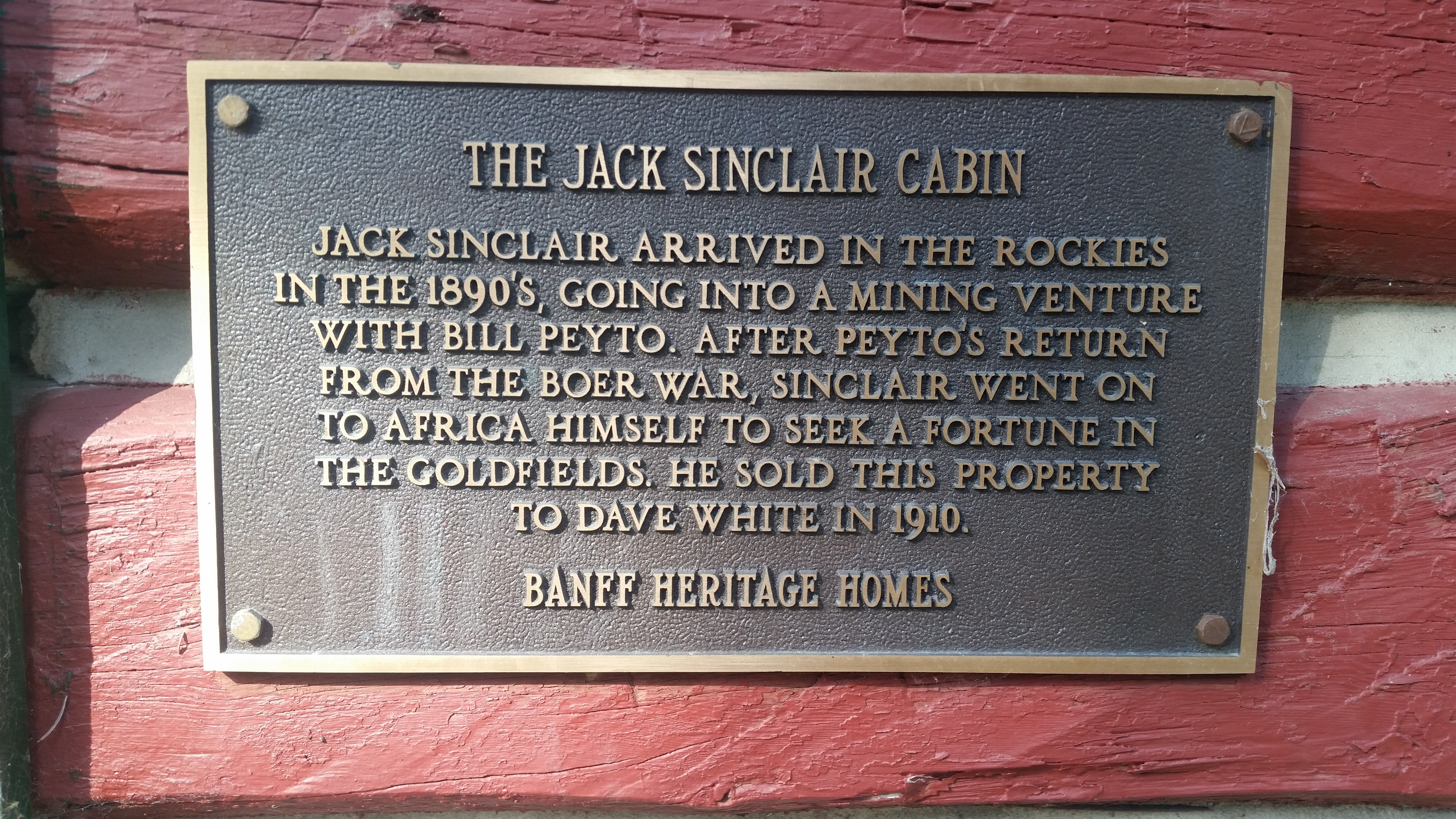
Jack Sinclair Cabin

Jack Sinclair was a prospector from Australia. After settling in Banff in the 1890s, Jack began packing for his prospecting companion and friend Bill Peyto. At the outbreak of the Boer war, Jack and Bill flipped a coin to see who would go forth to defend the Empire. Jack, losing the toss, stayed to look after their claims. Sinclair later decided to seek his own fortune in prospecting in Africa. The land near the Bow where the museum now stands was transferred to Dave White for $100 in 1910.

=== Mather cabin ===
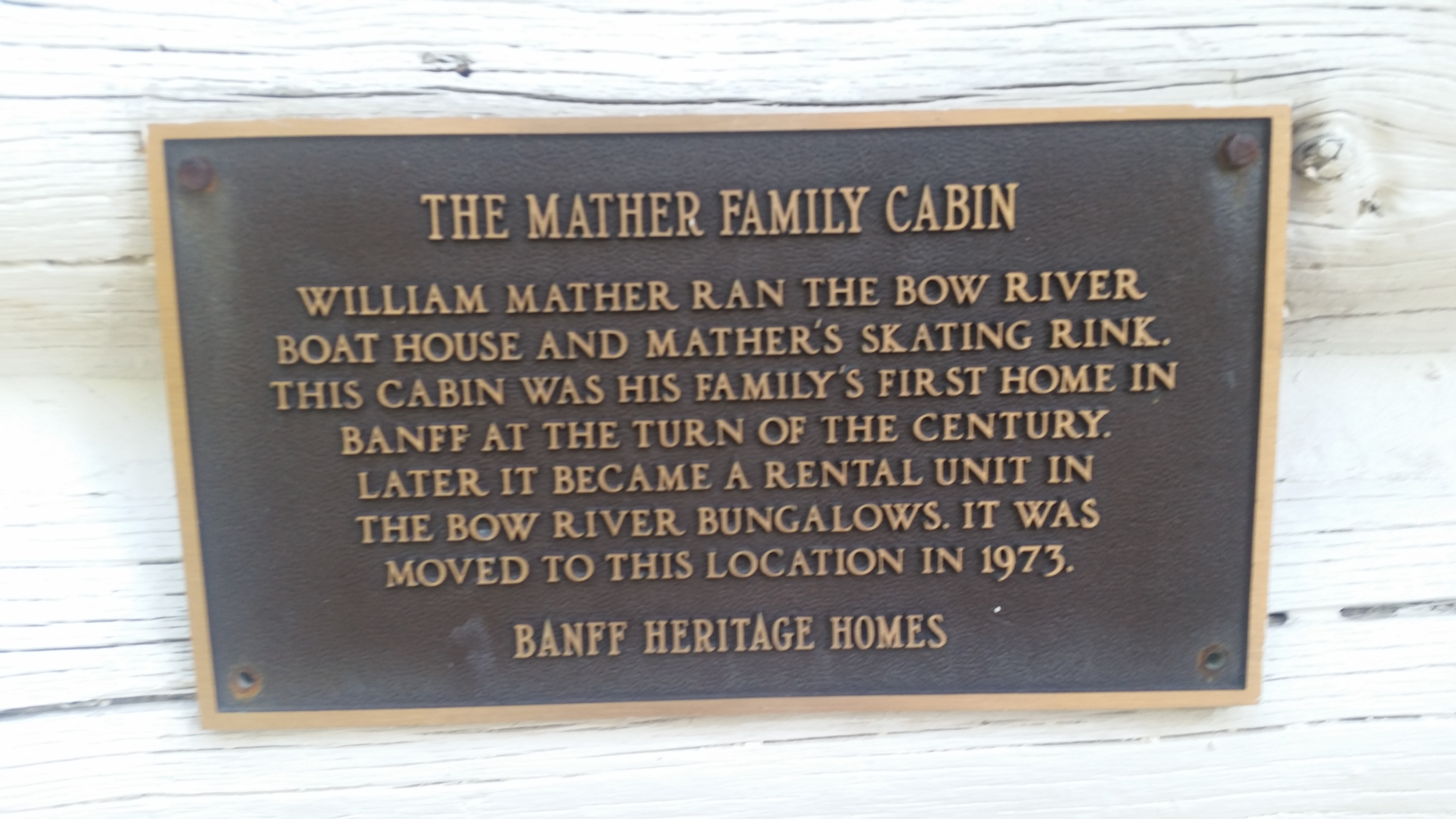
Mather Family Cabin

William Mather arrived in Banff from Ontario around 1910, where he entered into a boat rental business with Raymond Rooper. Bill later became sole owner and expanded the business to include ice skating in the winter. A well trained logman, Bill built the sturdy shaped timber cabin. This small structure was where Mather's four children were raised. Bill's wife once gave birth in the cabin during a large flood; the doctor who birthed the baby was wearing a pair of hipwaders! In later years Bill's son, Allen, rented the cabin out as part of a cabin rental business. The cabin was moved to the Whyte property from across the river in 1977.

=== Windy cabin ===
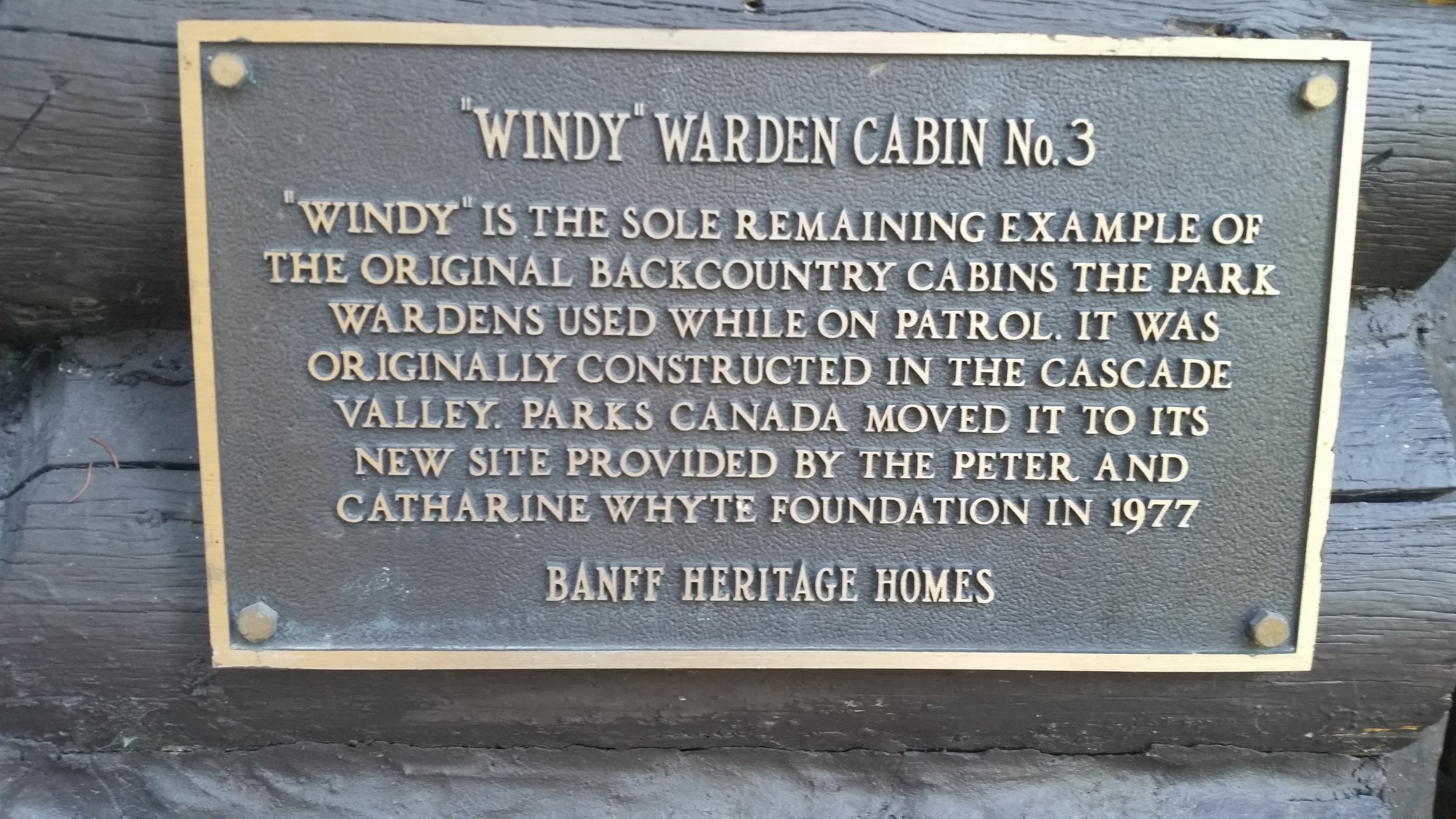
'Windy' Warden Cabin No. 3

Windy is the sole remaining example of the original backcountry cabins used by the National Parks Warden Service. It is the third of a string of cabins that enabled the wardens to patrol the park's frontiers from poaching. Built in 1911, Windy was located 45 kilometers north of Banff on the Panther River. As headquarters for the Panther River district, Windy was operated year-round. In the early 1970s, worried about the deterioration of this important structure, Parks Canada moved the cabin down the Cascade fire road to its present location. The Park Warden Service furnished Windy with appropriate artifacts in 1985.

== Archives and Library ==
The Whyte Museum's Archives & Library was established in 1966 to serve the unique mountain regions of Western Canada. The Archives & Library has various collections available, and holds the records and archival materials of the Alpine Club of Canada.

== Affiliations ==
The Museum is affiliated with CMA, CHIN, and Virtual Museum of Canada.
