= Bow River Bridge =

Bridge in Canada

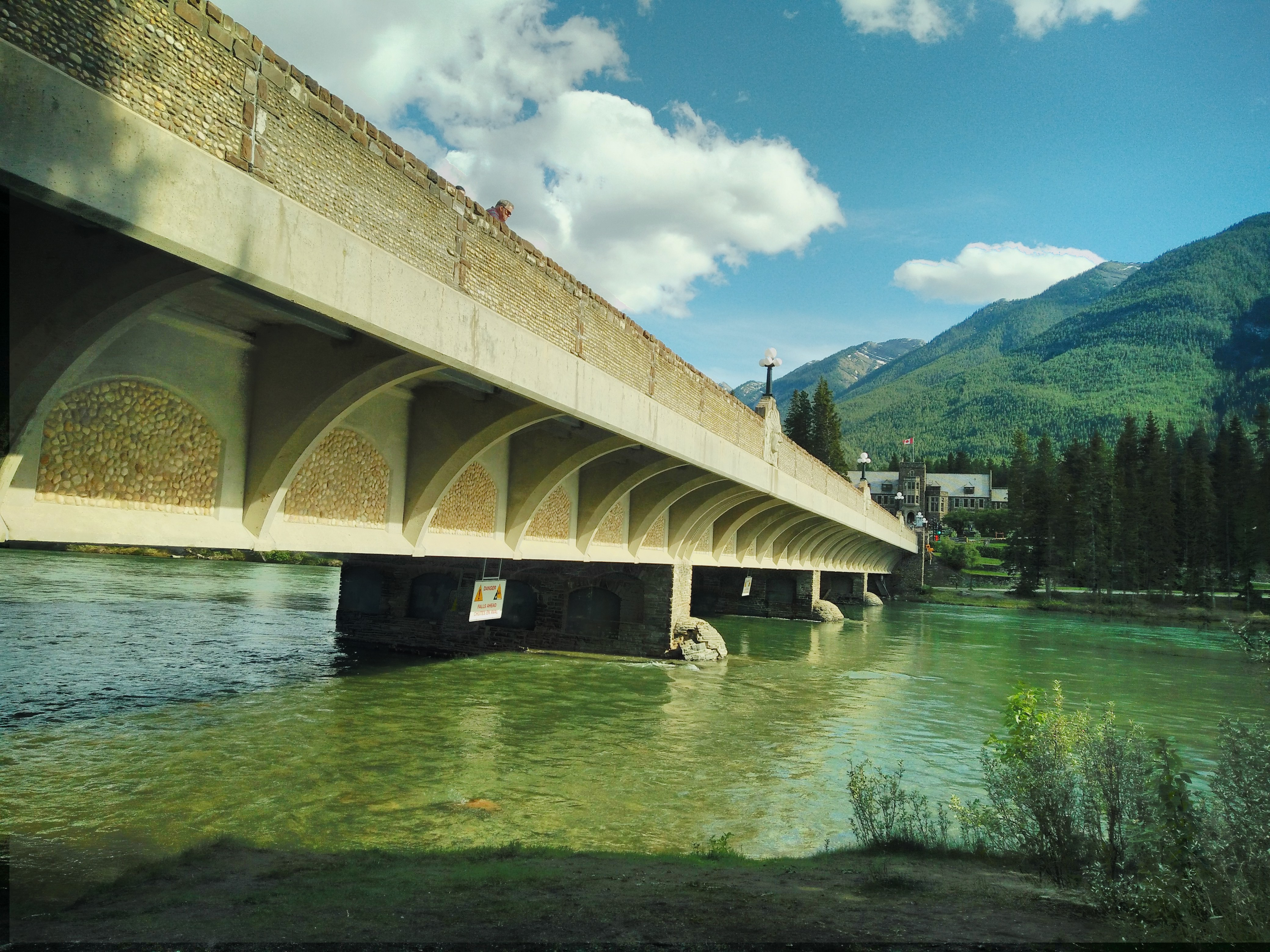
- Coordinates: 51°10′22″N 115°34′16″W
- Carries: Banff Avenue
- Crosses: Bow River

Characteristics
- Design: Girder Bridge
- Material: Reinforced concrete

History
- Contracted lead designer: Dr. E. Brydon-Jack
- Opened: 1921

The Bow River Bridge is a road bridge that spans the Bow River in Banff, Alberta. It was built in 1921 and is currently in use. The bridge is adorned with small stones from the river and locally sourced Rundle rock. The bridge also has 3 Indian head reliefs with headresses on either side.
