= Nicholas Raphael de Grandmaison =

Canadian artist (1892–1978)

Nicholas Raphael de Grandmaison CM
- Born: February 24, 1892; Poltava, Ukraine, Russian Empire
- Died: 1978
- Education: St. John's Wood School of Art, London, England
- Known for: Portrait painter
- Spouse: Sonia Dournovo (m. 1931)
- Children: 5

Nicholas Raphael de Grandmaison CM RCA (1892–1978) was a Ukrainian-born Canadian artist.

== Early life ==
De Grandmaison was born in Ukraine and lost his father when he was eight years old. He and the family then moved to Obojan to live near his mother's parents. When he was 11 years old, his mother sent him to Moscow where his uncle helped place him in Military College. He graduated from Military College in 1911 and in 1913, transferred to Military School for training as an officer and became a Sub-Lieutenant. Sent to East Prussia with his regiment, in 1914, when his regiment was defeated, he found himself a prisoner of war.

From a young age, he was interested in painting and the fine arts, and in the POW camp, he started making portraits. Released in 1918, he decided to flee Russia and escaped to England. Friends helped him attend St. John's Wood School of Art in London and afterwards, urged him to immigrate to Canada. He settled in Canada in Winnipeg in 1923 or 1924, and got a job at Brigden's, a commercial art firm, as well as joining the Winnipeg Arts Club. He painted portraits in Winnipeg and visited First Nations settlements to paint, then travelled to Saskatchewan where he painted more First Nations portraits, at last settling in Alberta, in Banff. From 1925 on, he preferred to record his portraits in pastel because they were portable, and easier to obtain than oils in Canada at that time.

== Life in Canada ==
On September 19, 1931, he married Sonia Dournovo, a fellow Russian artist living in Canada. Sonia was born in 1912 in Russia and was the daughter of Colonel Orest Dournovo and Alexandra Berdiaeff, who had immigrated to Canada after the Russian Revolution. Nicholas and Sonia decided to settle in Calgary, where they made their living painting portraits of children. But soon they both became interested in characterization, which developed into a lifelong study of the First Nations in Canada and America. They started to travel more to various reserves and reservations across North America in order for Nicholas to paint, but in 1939 made their home in Banff.

Nicholas de Grandmaison died in Calgary on March 23, 1974. After services in Calgary, his body was taken to the Peigan Reserve, where he was interred.

== Achievements ==
In 1959, de Grandmaison was inducted as an honorary chief of the Peigan Tribe. He was given the name Enuk-sapop - Little Plume.

By the end of his life, de Grandmaison was an associate member of the Royal Canadian Academy of Arts, spoke several First Nations' languages, and was invested as a member of the Order of Canada in 1972. Through his work and his art, de Grandmaison captured an important era of Canadian and American history, and is considered a prominent visual historian in Canada; his work is represented in numerous public and private art collections throughout North America.

De Grandmaison was staunchly proud of both his Russian and French heritage. He was particular that he had a "de" in front of his name and he was the only artist in Canada, he thought, to be "de Grandmaison". His eldest son (and his eldest child) was Orest ("O.N."), but generally known as "Rick", who made a name for himself in his own right in the art world. He painted under the name of O.N. Grandmaison (not "de Grandmaison"). Rick died an untimely death. Nicholas de Grandmaison had four other children (Tamara, Sonja Claire, Nicholas Grandmaison and Lubov Alexandra). A large collection of de Grandmaison works, together with an archive of the artist's life and work, are held by the University of Lethbridge, Alberta.
