= Cirque Peak =

Cirque Peak may refer to:

- Cirque Peak (Alberta) — in Banff National Park, Alberta, Canada
- Cirque Peak (Antarctica)
- Cirque Peak (British Columbia)
- Cirque Peak (California) — in the Sierra Nevada, in Inyo National Forest straddling the Golden Trout and John Muir Wildernesses border, California, U.S.
