= Mount Lowe =

Mount Lowe may refer to:

- Mount Lowe (Antarctica)
- Mount Lowe (British Columbia), Canada
- Mount Lowe (California), United States
