= Dolomite Peak =

Mountain in Banff NP, Alberta, Canada

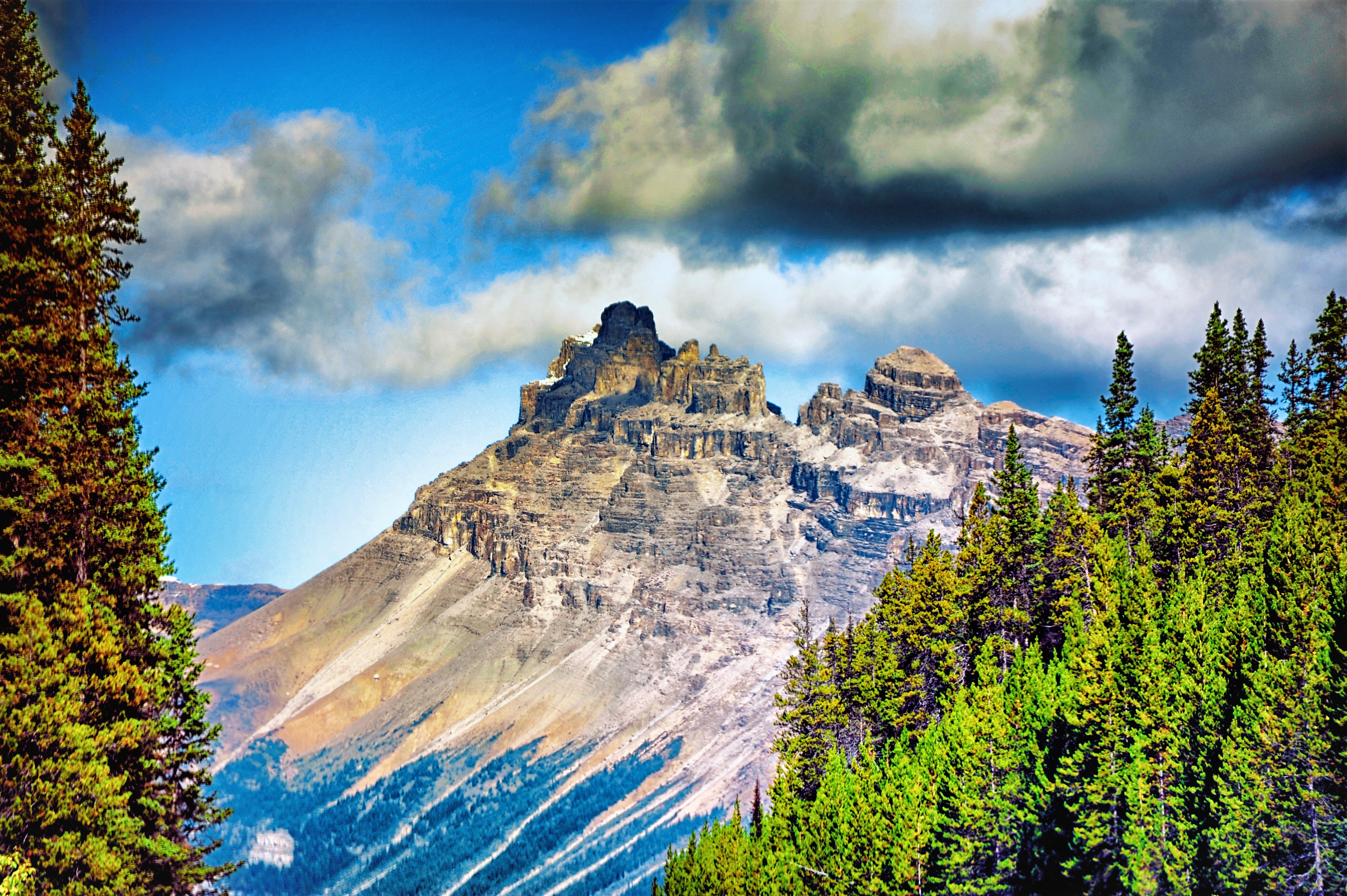
- Dolomite Peak

Highest point
- Elevation: 2,998 m (9,836 ft)
- Prominence: 366 m (1,201 ft)
- Parent peak: Cirque Peak (2993 m)
- Listing: Mountains of Alberta
- Coordinates: 51°40′33″N 116°22′21″W

Geography
- Location within Alberta Location within Canada
- Interactive map of Dolomite Peak
- Location: Alberta, Canada
- Parent range: Canadian Rockies
- Topo map: NTS 82N9 Hector Lake

Geology
- Rock age: Cambrian
- Rock type(s): Dolomite and Limestone

Climbing
- First ascent: 1930 by J. Monroe Thorington, and P. Kaufmann
- Easiest route: Scramble

Dolomite Peak is a 2,998-metre (9,836-foot) mountain summit located in the Bow River valley of Banff National Park, in the Canadian Rockies of Alberta, Canada. Its nearest higher peak is Cirque Peak, 3.98 km (2.47 mi) to the northwest. Dolomite Peak can be seen from the Icefields Parkway with its distinctive crags and colorful towers that are a mixture of dolomite and limestone. Dolomite is rare in the Rockies and is stronger than limestone.

== History ==
Dolomite Peak was named in 1897 by Charles E. Fay, Norman Collie, and Charles Thompson for its resemblance to the Dolomites of the Italian Alps. The mountain's name became official in 1924 by the Geographical Names Board of Canada. The first ascent of Dolomite Peak was made in 1930 by J. Monroe Thorington, with Peter Kaufmann (as guide).

== Geology ==
Like other mountains in Banff Park, Dolomite Peak is composed of sedimentary rock laid down during the Precambrian to Jurassic periods. Formed in shallow seas, this sedimentary rock was pushed east and over the top of younger rock during the Laramide orogeny.

== Climate ==
Based on the Köppen climate classification, Dolomite Peak is located in a subarctic climate with cold, snowy winters, and mild summers. Temperatures can drop below −20 °C with wind chill factors below −30 °C. Precipitation runoff from Dolomite Peak drains into the Bow River which is a tributary of the Saskatchewan River. The months July through September offer the most favorable weather for viewing and climbing this peak.

== Gallery ==
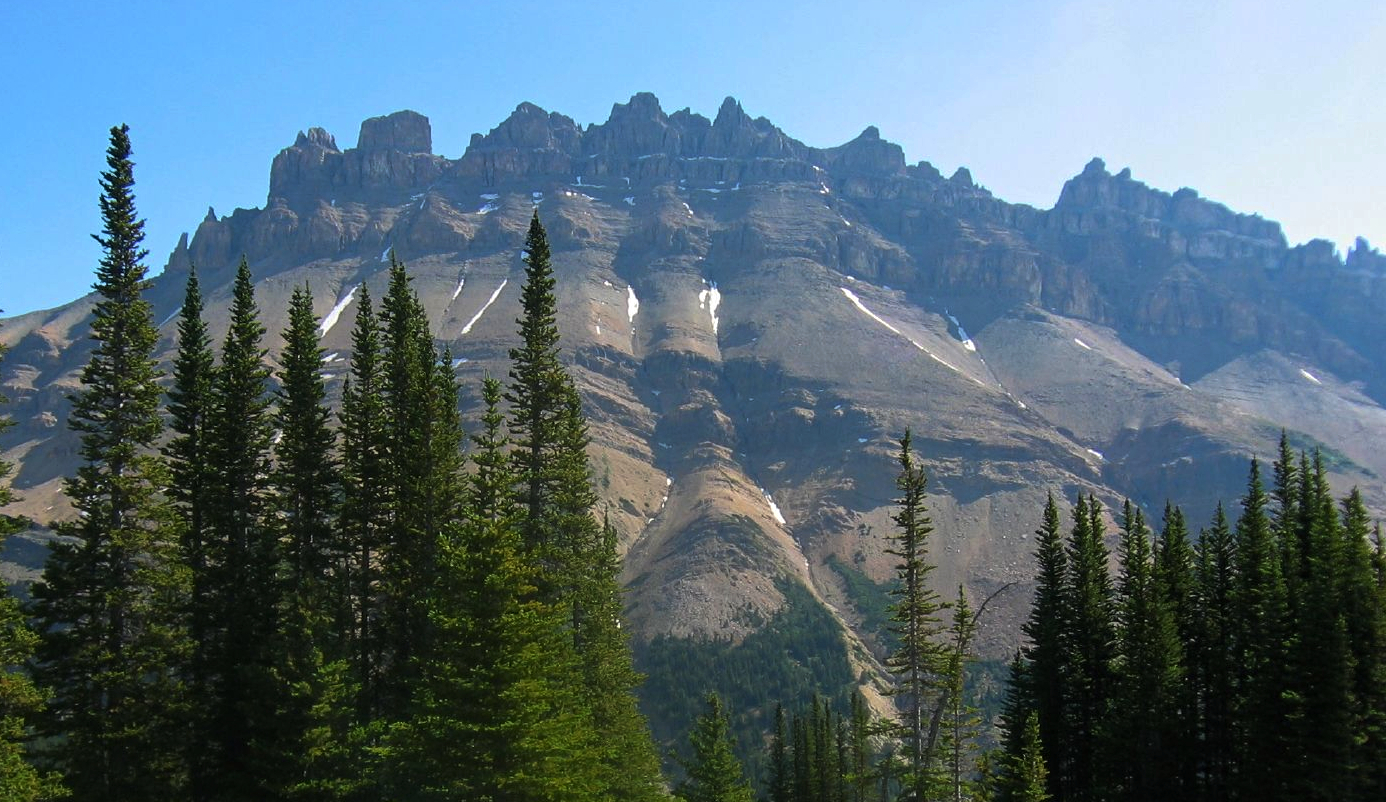
Dolomite Peak, west aspect

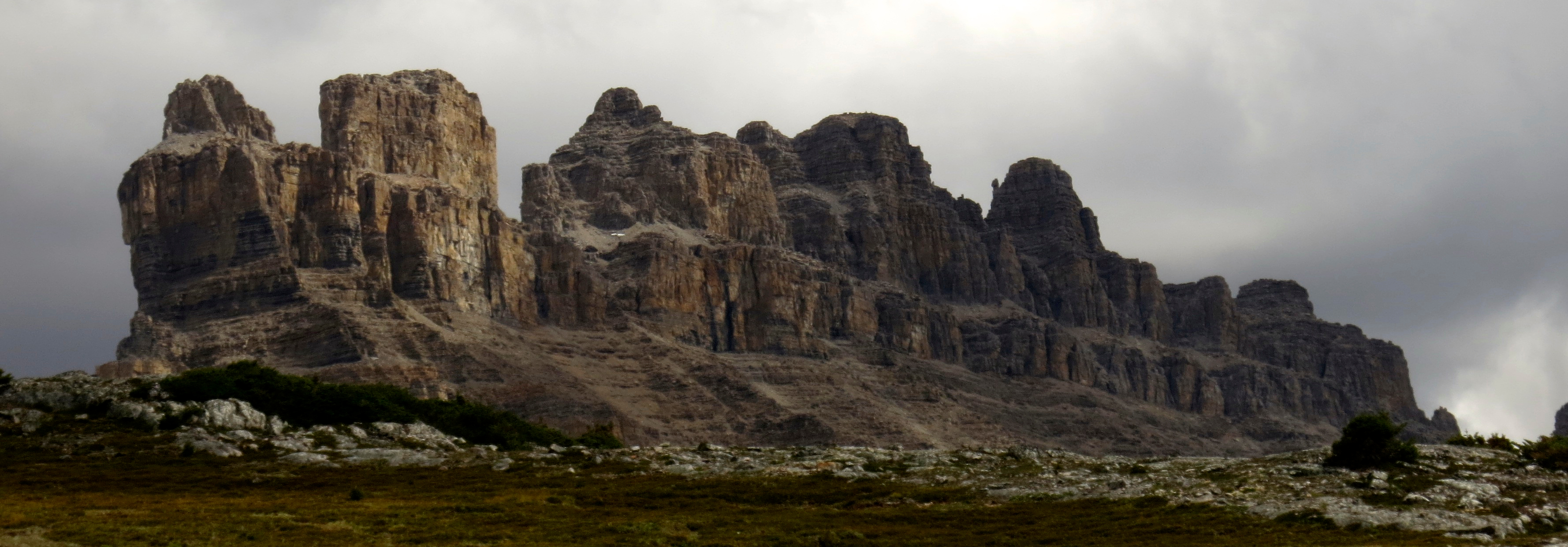
Dolomite Peak close up

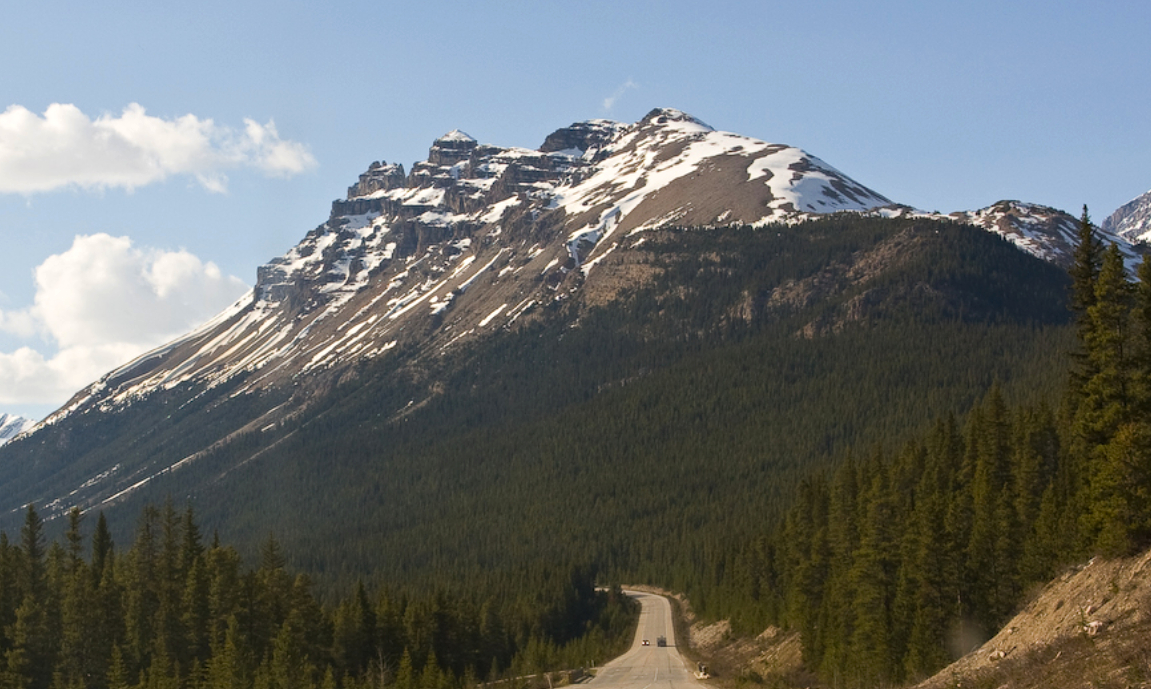
Dolomite Peak seen from northbound Icefields Parkway

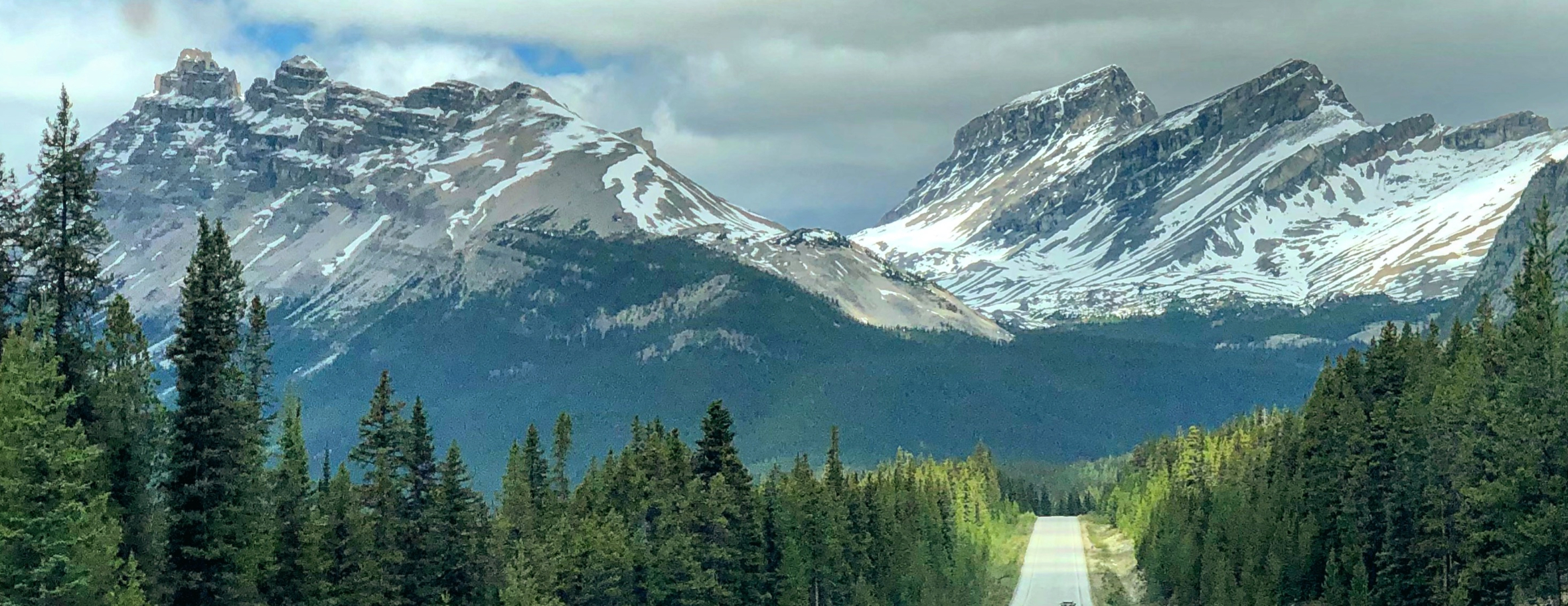
Dolomite Peak (left) and Watermelon Peak S2 (2929 m) to right

== See also ==
- List of mountains of Canada
- Geology of Alberta
