= Peter Kaufmann-Bohren =

Swiss alpinist (b. 1886, d. 1971)

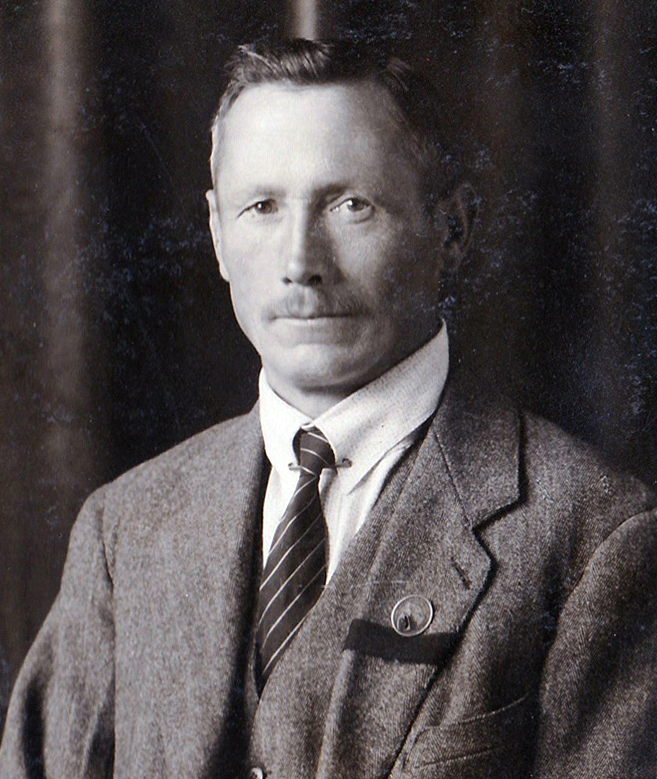
- Kaufmann-Bohren ca. 1914

Personal information
- Nationality: Swiss
- Born: June 23, 1886 Grindelwald, Switzerland
- Died: June 23, 1971 (aged 85)
- Spouse: Margaritha Bohren (1894–1959)
- Children: Peter Kaufmann; Alice Kaufmann-Lüthi; Hansi Kaufmann
- Parent: Father: Peter Kaufmann (1858–1924) Mother: Maria Elise von Allmen (1860–1938)

Peter Kaufmann-Bohren (June 23, 1886 – June 23, 1971) was a Swiss ski instructor and mountain guide, climbing in the Swiss Alps and the Canadian Rockies.

== Family and early life (1886–1905) ==
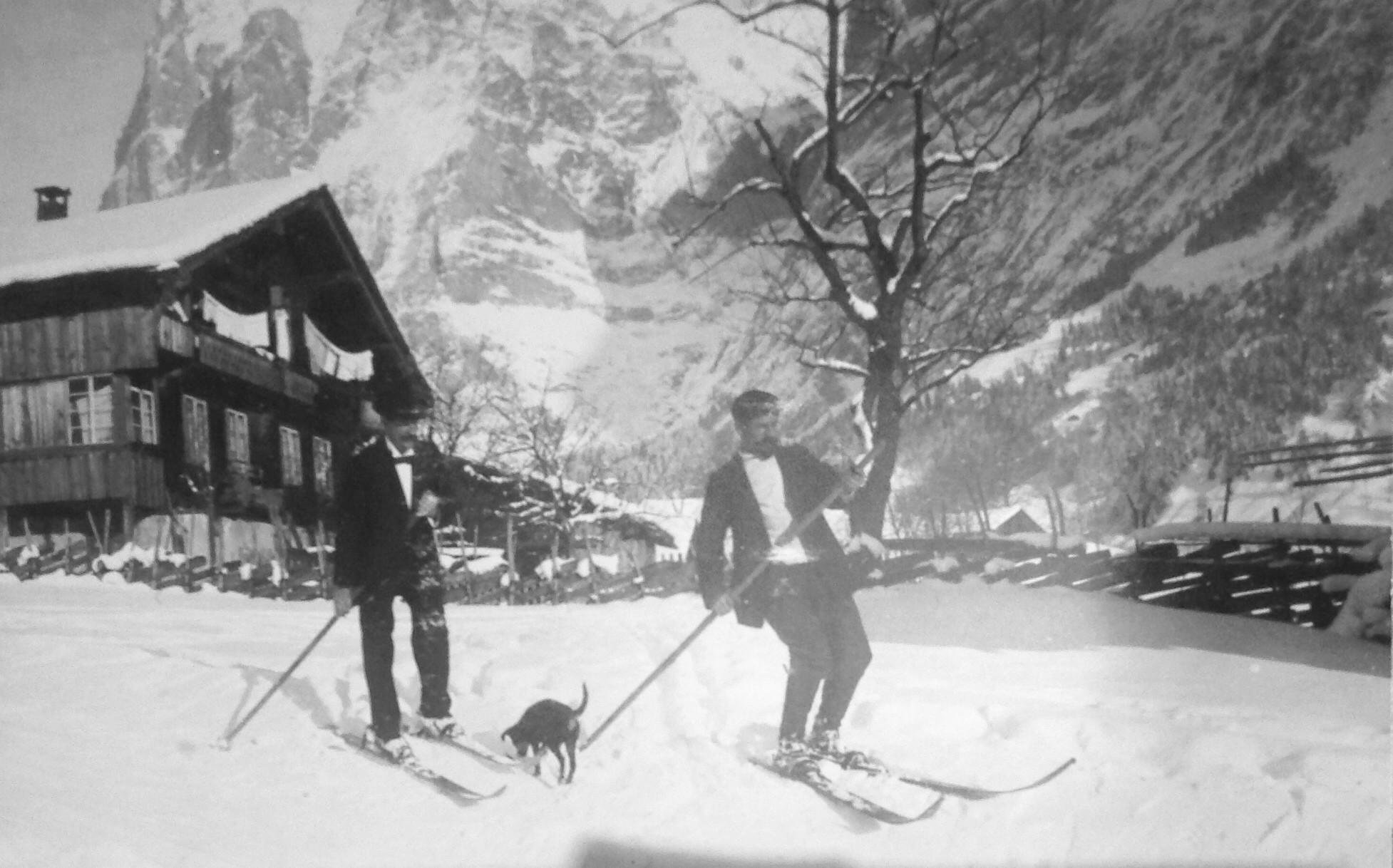
Gerald Fox (right), who encouraged Peter's uncles to ski, brought the sport to Grindelwald (1891).

Kaufmann-Bohren was born in 1886, at his family's house (am Fussweg) in Grindelwald. He was the eldest son and grew up in a family eight siblings. His father Peter Kaufmann-von Allmen and his grandfather Grabipeter (1832-1903) were established, certified mountain guides, who lived during the golden and silver ages of Alpinism. The Kaufmanns had been professional mountain guides for several generations, but Peter not only became a mountaineer but also an excellent skier and ski instructor. Skiing was introduced to Grindelwald in 1890. It was Gerald Fox (1865 - 1947), who brought skis to the area, after he had “discovered” them in Scandinavia. Whenever he left the Hotel Bären lobby on skis, locals and tourists shook their heads and said he was crazy. But he soon convinced some mountain climbers, guides, and two teenagers to slide across the snow on two long wooden boards. Those two adventurous sixteen-year-olds who tried skiing for the first time in February 1891 were Hans (1874-1930) and Ruedi Kaufmann (born 1875), Peter's uncles.

== Youth in England and Switzerland (1905–1913) ==
At the age of 19, Kaufmann-Bohren travelled to England to earn money for the family and to learn the English language. He went to Great Britain several times, spending seven years there. In 1911, he was working as a hotel porter at the Imperial Hotel in Malvern, England, probably helping guests with luggage along the "worm," "a corrugated iron tunnel leading up to the hotel," that allowed first-class passengers arriving at Great Malvern station to walk straight into the hotel without going outside. At least three other Swiss from the Bernese Oberland were working at the hotel at the time.

Upon his final return from England, he settled in Neuhausen am Rheinfall where he met his future wife, Margaritha Bohren, who was also from Grindelwald.

== Early climbing (1914–1920) ==
Following in his father's and grandfather's footsteps, Kaufmann-Bohren applied for his license to become a certified mountain guide. After passing his examinations, he began as a porter in June and July 1914; he accompanied certified mountain guides and their clients as a porter to the summits of the Wetterhorn, Jungfrau, Mönch, Eiger, Finsteraarhorn, Faulberg, and the Gross Fiescherhorn over the great Aletschhorn. Charles Francis Alexander Fyfe, from Liverpool, England, wrote the first entry into Kaufmann's Führer-Buch: "Peter Kaufmann was my porter, up to the top of the Wetterhorn today [June 22,1914], and I found him to be a safe companion of the mountain." J. V. I. Long, from Arundel, England, writes that Peter Kaufmann "(nephew of Christian Kaufmann) . . . showed himself very capable and willing, carrying anything I asked him to without ever showing any sign of fatigue, even at the end of the climb, and I am convinced he will shortly make a first class guide."

In 1918, at the age of 32, he married Margaritha Bohren (1871-1959).

== Professional climbing (I) (1920–1929) ==
On April 1, 1920, Kaufmann-Bohren was certified as a mountain guide 2. Klasse. During the 1920s, he frequently climbed with his father (Peter Kaufmann-von Allmen), step-uncles, and brother (Fritz), and he was praised not only for his excellent climbing skills but also his skiing abilities. On December 20, 1928, he received his teaching certificate as a ski teacher (Skilehrer Patent) from the Bernese Ski-Teachers' Commission, which he renewed annually for 36 years.

Cover of Peter Kaufmann-Bohren's ski instructor booklet containing certificate [Skilehrer Patent] and annual records (1928).

The Englishman Anthony Melland Robinson (1907-1950) recounted several climbs with Peter Kaufmann in Alpine Roundabout (1946). During four days of climbing in 1929, he remarked that Kaufmann “is always ready to explain points that puzzle the beginner.” For example, he clarified that a large china cup to drink spring water was used by climbers above the Milchbach ladders headed for the Gleckstein Hut; and as Kaufmann-Bohren explained, “It was always replaced after [passers-by] had drunk their fill, never broken and never stolen though fettered by no rusty chain to the rock.”

One of Kaufmann's repeated clients was Peter Daniell (1909-2002), who originally "spent childhood holidays in Switzerland to cure asthma," but "became a passionate mountaineer, scaling many Alpine peaks in his student days." Daniell describes Kaufmann as a "first class guide, a good and amusing companion" (Sept 1926), who is "always cheerful and entertaining (Aug 1928), on climbs to the Klein and Gross Schreckhorn as well as the Finsteraarhorn (Aug 1931). Upon Daniell's recommendation, C. A. Chadwick-Maley and his brother hired Kaufmann for climbs in the Oberland (Wetterhorn) and the Wallis and wrote that they "learned much from him," but observe that "he eats far too much, but as he has to carry the food, one can hardly complain."

== In Canada with Cromwell and Thorington (1930) ==
Peter Kaufmann-Bohren, Swiss mountain guide from Grindelwald, on horseback in the Canadian Rockies (1930).

Kaufmann-Bohren travelled to Canada in 1930, leaving Cherboug, France, aboard the S.S. Montrose on June 5, arriving in Quebec City June 13, and in Banff June 17. He had been hired by Oliver Eaton Cromwell (1892–1987) to do climbing in the Canadian Rockies. However, upon his arrival, Kaufmann travelled into the Yoho Valley to meet James Monroe Thorington (1894–1989), who says that "Kaufmann was loaned to me for the time preceding Cromwell's arrival."

Thorington reported a very active 12 days of climbing with Kaufmann. Encountering heavy late snowfall near Twin Falls, they "were obliged to carry [their] loads" rather than using pack horses. On June 23, they met the guide Edward Feuz, Jr., who joined them the following day to "motor to Moraine Lake" and climbed Mt. Temple (11624 ft / 3543 m). The next day, June 25, Kaufmann and Thorington left Lake Louise with heavy packs, fording a swiftly flowing Mosquito Creek with a rope, and reaching the cabins at Bow Lake. Thorington comments: "Peter has long since forgiven me, but 25 miles with packs after a high climb, is not easily forgotten."

After rowing across Bow Lake on June 27, Kaufmann and Thorington made a first ascent of Saint Nicholas Peak (9,639 ft / 2,938 m) and a second ascent of Mount Olive (10,256 ft / 3,126 m). And then on June 30, they made an eleven-and-a-half hour trip rowing down Bow Lake, fording streams, hiking along frozen lakes, and making a first ascent of Dolomite Peak (2,860 m / 9,380 ft).

On July 1, Cromwell met Kaufmann and Thorington at their Bow Lake camp; two other climbers, Dyson Duncan and Alden F. Megrew, also arrive from Lake Louise with three packers and fifteen horses. Megrew described the size of the expedition: "Our pack-train was increased here to twenty-seven horses, five packers and five travelers, and with this outfit we proceeded directly to the Freshfield group, which we reached on July 4th." and climbed Mt. Thompson (3,089 m / 10,135 ft).

Then from July 5 to 15, 1930, Kaufmann and Cromwell made seven first-ascents:

July 5: Unnamed Peak (3177 m / 10,423 ft). First ascent; at head of Pangman glacier, Freshfield group; descent east ridge.

July 7: Mt. Skene (3,063 m / 10,100 ft). First ascent, Freshfield group.

July 7: Mt. Conway (3,098 m / 10,164 ft). First ascent, traverse from south to north; Freshfield group.

July 9: Mt. Barlow (3,143 m / 10,312 ft). First ascent, traverse from west to east; Freshfield group.

July 9: Mt. Lowe (3,054 m / 10,020 ft). First ascent, via south ridge.

July 12: Mt. Forbes (3,612 m / 11,850 ft): First ascent of north ridge, descent west ridge.

July 15: Mt. Ayesha (3067 m / 10062 ft). First ascent, via east face and descent by west ridge, crossing from Bow Lake to Twin Falls and Yoho Camp, over Waputik Icefield.

At Old Cabin camp, Dutch Creek southern Purcells, Canada, (July 24, 1930). From left to right: Peter Kaufmann-Bohren (1886-1971), James Monroe Thorington (1894-1989), Conrad Kain (1883-1934) and Olivier Eaton Cromwell (1892–1987) during the expedition to find the source of the Columbia River.

Thorington and Cromwell had one major reason to visit Canada: To locate the real source of the Columbia River in the southern Purcell Range. The geographer and explorer David Thompson (1770 – 1857) had declared in 1807 that the River originated from Columbia Lake. Thorington and Cromwell were determined to examine the creeks and glaciers that fed into Columbia Lake, and thereby discover the actual source of the Columbia River. To achieve this goal, they had employed Peter Kaufmann and the renown Austrian mountaineer and wrangler, Conrad Kain (1883–1934), as their guides. At age 47, Kain had reduced his climbing and had established himself as a wrangler, providing pack-horses for wilderness excursions. Having gone ahead with supplies and horses, Kain met Kaufmann, Cromwell, and Thorington on July 18, 1930, at Walter and Melrose Hawke's Justamere Ranch in the Windermere Valley.

Although Kaufmann and his companions made the trip from Invermere to the Ranch in relative comfort by "motor-truck," the journey up Dutch Creek to the mountains of the Continental Divide was much more demanding, as existing trails narrowed and finally disappeared, forcing the group to leave its pack horses behind. Kaufmann and Kain's packer, George Rennenkampf, often moved ahead with axes, clearing a trail. Thorington observed wildlife (e.g., lynx, buck deer, mountain goats, and grizzly bears) and made geographical aneroid measurements, including training "the motion picture camera on the glacier [as] Conrad pointed to the slope above." On July 24, he was especially thrilled seeing the melting snow and ice as "hoary marmots sunned themselves on the rocks beside the baby Columbia river," the river's "ultimate source."

Peter Kaufmann-Bohren (1886-1971) on a crevasse of the Bugaboo glacier, Purcell Mountains of eastern British Columbia (August 11, 1930).

Thorington detailed the source of the Columbia River:

"Kaufmann, in order to gain a better view along the ridge immediately to our right, scrambled a little summit scarcely 400 feet above us. We have called it Trikootenay Peak (8,241 ft / 2,512 m), as it is the apex of the triple divide between the Columbia and Kootenay rivers and Kootenay lake . . . , placing the glacial source of the Columbia river some 25 miles west and 4 miles south of Canal Flats at the upper end of Columbia lake."

From July 24 to 30, Kaufmann made two first ascents with Cromwell and Thorington at the headwaters of Dutch Creek: Mount Findlay (10,299 ft / 3139 m) and another mountain they named Saffron Peak (10,018 ft / 3,054 m), due to its yellowish colored stone. Moreover, in addition to Trikootenay Peak, they named two other peaks in the area: Mount Rowand (8934 ft / 2723 m), and Mount Morigeau (8179 ft / 2493 m). The expedition ended on July 30, as the group travelled by truck from the Hawke Ranch to Golden, BC.

On August 5, 1930, Kaufmann met Eaton Cromwell, Conrad Kain, George Rennenkampf (Kain's wrangler) at Spillimacheen, BC, in the Columbia River Valley south of Golden, BC. Their goal was to climb the Bugaboos in the northwestern Purcells. They travelled up Bugaboo Creek to "the toe of Bugaboo glacier," and, on August 7, left camp for Snowpatch Peak (named by Cromwell) and Pigeon Spire (3156 m / 10354 ft), "leaving all impedimenta behind except a piece of chocolate and the Kodak" and reaching the summit after a challenging climb. Kain had become ill while attempting this climb. In a letter to Thorington he later said: "I was very sorry that I could not make the climb on the spire. I was not in trim and decided to turn back. I am now convinced that this spire was the most difficult ascent I have made in Canada."

Peter Kaufmann-Bohren and Olivier Eaton Cromwell near the summit of Mt. Forbes.

Cromwell and Kaufmann climbed Howser Peak (3082 m/10,112 ft) on August 8 and found a cairn left by Captain MacCarthy and Conrad Kain 14 years earlier.

Conrad Kain had not accompanied Kaufmann and Cromwell on these climbs. However, on August 10, in honor of Conrad's 47th birthday, the three climbed Center Peak (2549 m / 8,363 ft), " an excellent and interesting climb." Cromwell explained: "Just below the summit, we were stopped by a vertical, holdless pitch some twelve to fifteen feet in height. This Conrad beat by taking a back-stand furnished by Peter and myself, inserting the pick of his ice-axe into the horizontal fissure and swarming up the handle until he could get his finger into the crack. From there he swung out to the right, found a small ledge, and was up. I did not find it easy, being the last. The axe came away, and I was left suspended like Mahomet's coffin, 'twixt heaven and earth, until a long pull, and a stout pull. Brought me also to the top." Although Conrad was one of the most capable mountaineers of his day, by 1930 he had reduced his climbing substantially, so that he wrote to Thorington in March 1931, "It would be to your and my advantage if you could find a third man to come along for the trip . . . if you bring a guide it is OK with me."

In mid-August 1930, Kaufmann and Cromwell made their final climbs in the Bugaboo group, including "two little peaks . . . Thimble and Flat Top," offering "sensational view of the Howser Spires, which from this vantage point appear quite as impressive as the Chamonix Aiguilles." Their attempt on Bugaboo Spire was a "non-success."

== Professional climbing (II) (1931–1946) ==
Peter Kaufmann-Bohren with other workers on the Eiger ridge, constructing the Mittellegi Hut (Mittellegihütte) in 1924.

On July 4, 1931, Kaufmann received the highest rank as a mountain guide, Bergführer 1. Klasse.

During the 1930s, there were repeated attempts to conquer the Eiger's north face —including the infamous climb in 1936 by Andreas Hinterstoisser, Toni Kurz, Willy Angerer, and Edi Rainer. Kaufmann continued to take clients up the mountain via the northeastern ridge from the Mittellegi to the summit. He had helped construct the hut on the ridge in 1924 and was familiar with this approach. On August 27, 1936, for example, Hedi Gräub reported that Kaufmann guided her to the Mittellegi hut from the Jungfrau railway Station Eismeer; and, on the following day, she praised him for cutting steps into the icy wall and guarding against powerful winds coming up south wall of the mountain. In short, “On this difficult ascent, P. Kaufmann proved to be a safe guide, who can handle any situation.” Given his knowledge of this route, it made sense that he and fellow guide Inäbnit brought back the injured Italian guide Giuseppe Piravano on July 28, 1937, from the Mittellegi hut after an unsuccessful attempt with Bruno Detassis of the Eiger's north face.

On the lighter side, in August 1940 and 1941, Trudy Schwärzel summarized her climbs in an unusual manner, as two poetic entries in Peter's Führerbuch in Basler dialect. She praises Peter Kaufmann:

"Er zieht di d'Felse ab und uff,/und über der Glätscherschrund/er hackt die steile Hang duruff,/dass d'laufsch wie uf em Grund./ Er luegt so guet und sorgt für aim,/passt uff uf dini Tritt/er bringt di glücklig wieder heim--/ja, das isch Feriezyt! . . . S'git viel gueti Fiehrer,/i weiss Nummer ein./er heisst Peter Kaufme,/und ich do deheim."

== Later professional climbing (1946–1959) ==
Following the end of the Second World War, Kaufmann resumed his work as a mountain guide in 1946, completing numerous climbs in the Bernese Oberland during the late 1940s and the 1950s.

The last entry in his Führer-Buch, written by John Corsan on August 28, 1959, again praised Peter as "a generous and cheerful companion," who is "extremely patient and careful . . . as well as being helpful and encouraging to a party of comparative novices [Gillian McClare, Madeline A. Lund, G. N. Dyson, and J. D. Hardcastle] in the Alps." Corsan also thanks Fritz Kaufmann (1902-1978), Peter's younger brother, "who led the second rope."

In 1959, Peter's wife of 41 years Margaritha (née Bohren, 1871) died. She had had her own career in Grindelwald as a midwife from 1935 to 1951.

== Certified ski instructor (1960-1969) ==
During the 1960s, Kaufmann was an active ski instructor for adults and children at the Bodmi Ski School on the Terrassenweg in Grindelwald.

== Final years (1970-1971) ==
Peter Kaufmann-Bohren gravestone in the Grindelwald church cemetery.

At the age of 85, while visiting his family in Thun, Switzerland, Peter Kaufmann-Bohren suffered a stoke. He died on the anniversary of his birth, June 23, 1971, and was buried in the Grindelwald cemetery. A gravestone in his memory has been preserved.
