= Mount Conway =

Mountain in the country of Canada

- Location within Alberta Location within British Columbia Location within Canada

Highest point
- Elevation: 3,098 m (10,164 ft)
- Prominence: 403 m (1,322 ft)
- Parent peak: Mount Lambe (3183 m)
- Listing: Mountains of Alberta; Mountains of British Columbia
- Coordinates: 51°45′52″N 116°47′35″W

Geography
- Country: Canada
- Provinces: Alberta and British Columbia
- Protected area: Banff National Park
- Parent range: Park Ranges
- Topo map: NTS 82N15 Mistaya Lake

Climbing
- First ascent: 1930 by O.E. Cromwell, J. Monroe. Thorington, P. Kaufmann

Mount Conway is a mountain located on the border of Alberta and British Columbia. It was named in 1901 by J. Norman Collie after Martin Conway, an alpinist.

== See also ==
- List of peaks on the Alberta–British Columbia border
- Geography of Alberta
- Geography of British Columbia
