= Cirque Peak (California) =

Mountain summit in California, United States

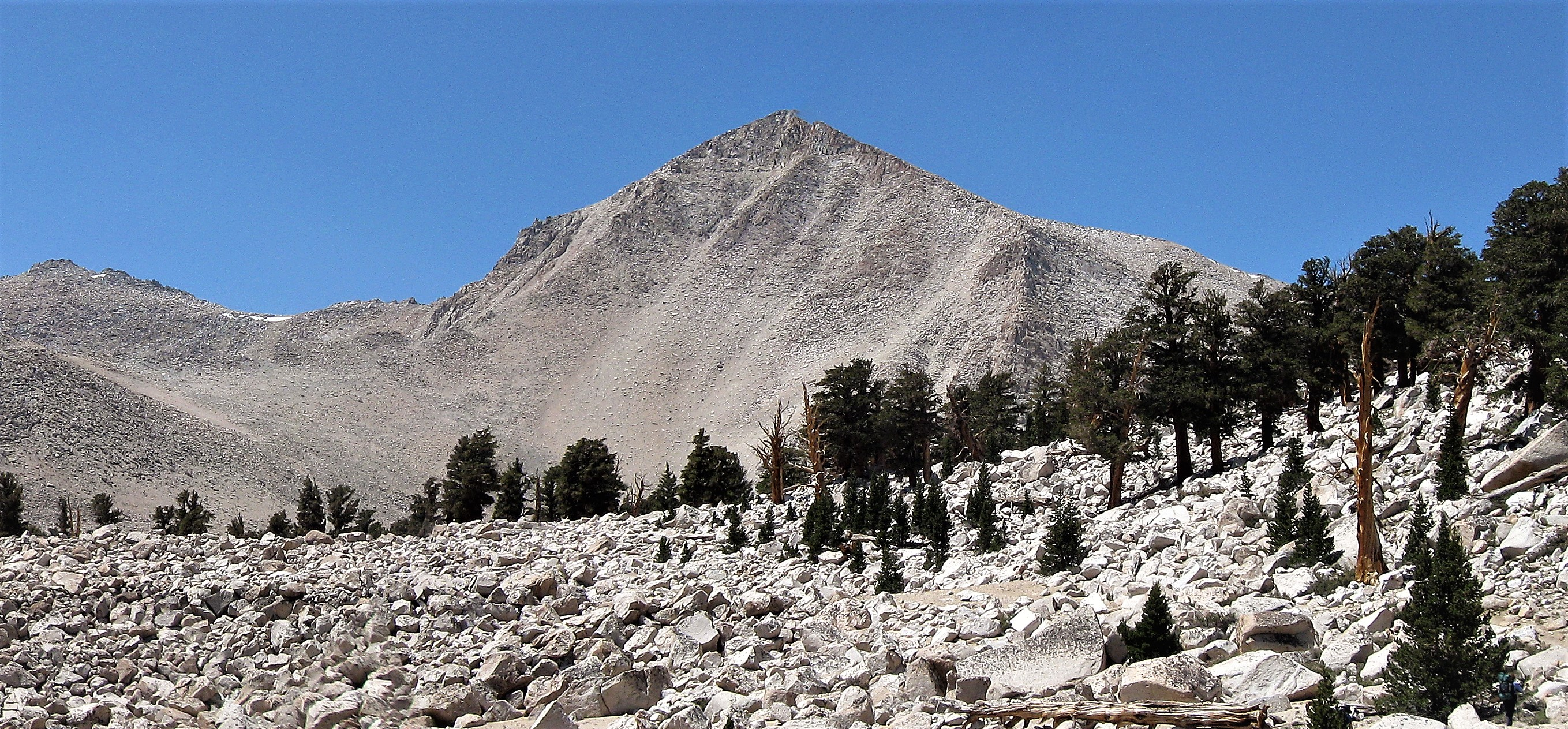
- Northeast aspect

Highest point
- Elevation: 12,906 ft (3,934 m) NAVD 88
- Prominence: 900 ft (274 m)
- Parent peak: Mount Langley
- Isolation: 2.59 mi (4.17 km)
- Listing: Sierra Peaks Section; Vagmarken Club Sierra Crest List
- Coordinates: 36°28′37″N 118°14′13″W

Naming
- Etymology: cirque

Geography
- Location within California Location within the United States
- Country: United States
- State: California
- County: Tulare / Inyo
- Protected area: John Muir Wilderness
- Parent range: Sierra Nevada
- Topo map: USGS Cirque Peak

Geology
- Rock age: Cretaceous
- Mountain type: Fault block
- Rock type: granitic

Climbing
- Easiest route: Exposed scramble, class 2

Cirque Peak is a 12,900-foot-elevation (3,900-meter) mountain summit located on the crest of the Sierra Nevada mountain range in California. It is situated on the common border of Tulare County with Inyo County, as well as the shared boundary of Golden Trout Wilderness and John Muir Wilderness, on land managed by Inyo National Forest. It is 14 miles (23 km) southwest of the community of Lone Pine, 7.7 miles (12.4 km) south-southeast of Mount Whitney, and 3.2 miles (5.1 km) south of Mount Langley, the nearest higher neighbor. Cirque Peak is the highest point of the Golden Trout Wilderness, and ranks as the 175th highest peak in California. Topographic relief is significant as it rises 1,800 feet (550 meters) above Cirque Lake in approximately one mile. The Pacific Crest Trail traverses the southwest slope of this mountain, providing an approach option. The mountain was apparently named in 1890 by Joseph Nisbet LeConte and companions who noted the remarkable cirque on the north aspect.

== Climate ==
According to the Köppen climate classification system, Cirque Peak has an alpine climate. Most weather fronts originate in the Pacific Ocean, and travel east toward the Sierra Nevada mountains. As fronts approach, they are forced upward by the peaks, causing them to drop their moisture in the form of rain or snowfall onto the range (orographic lift). Precipitation runoff from this mountain drains west to the Kern River via Golden Trout Creek, and east to Owens Valley via Cottonwood Creek.

== Gallery ==
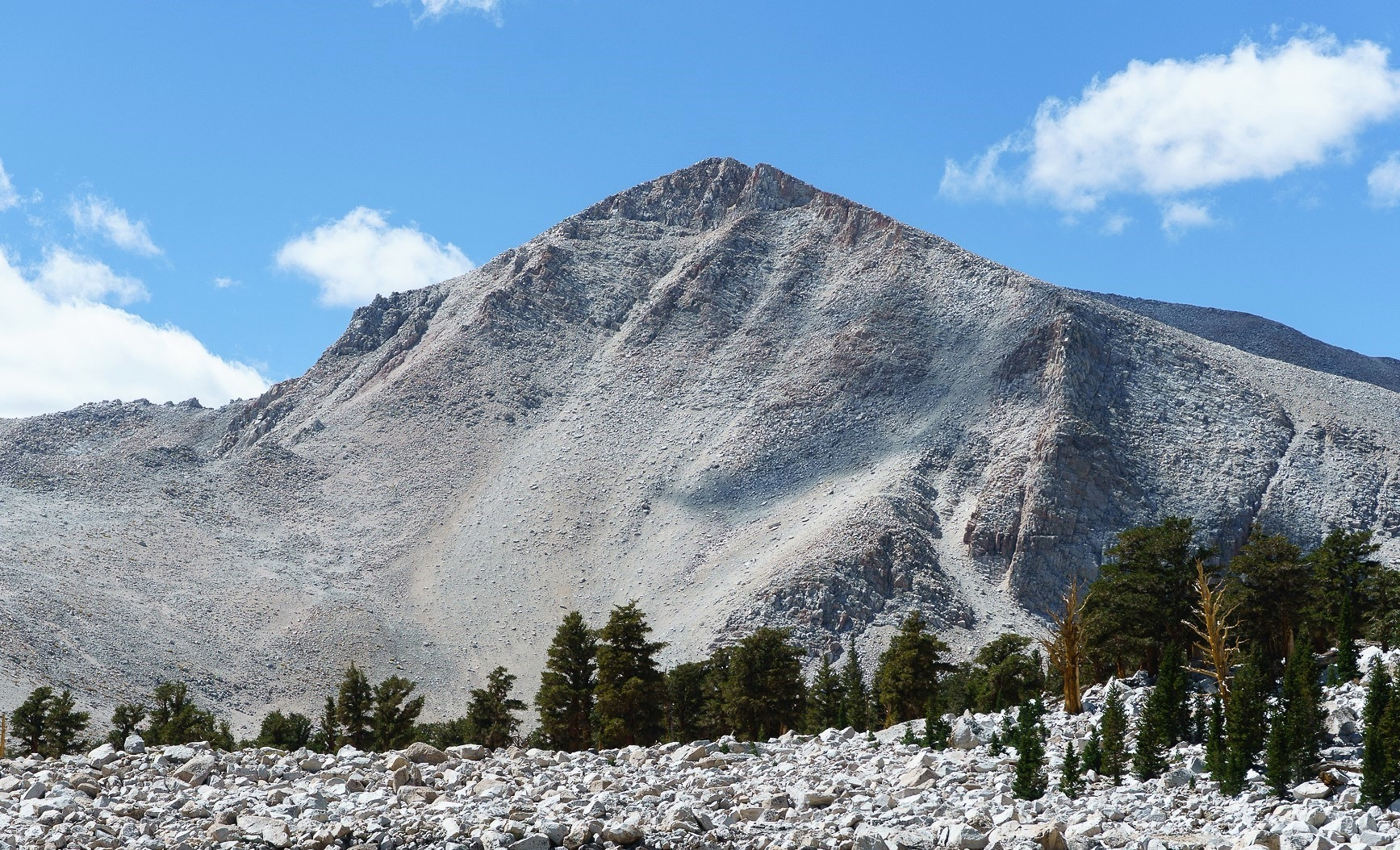

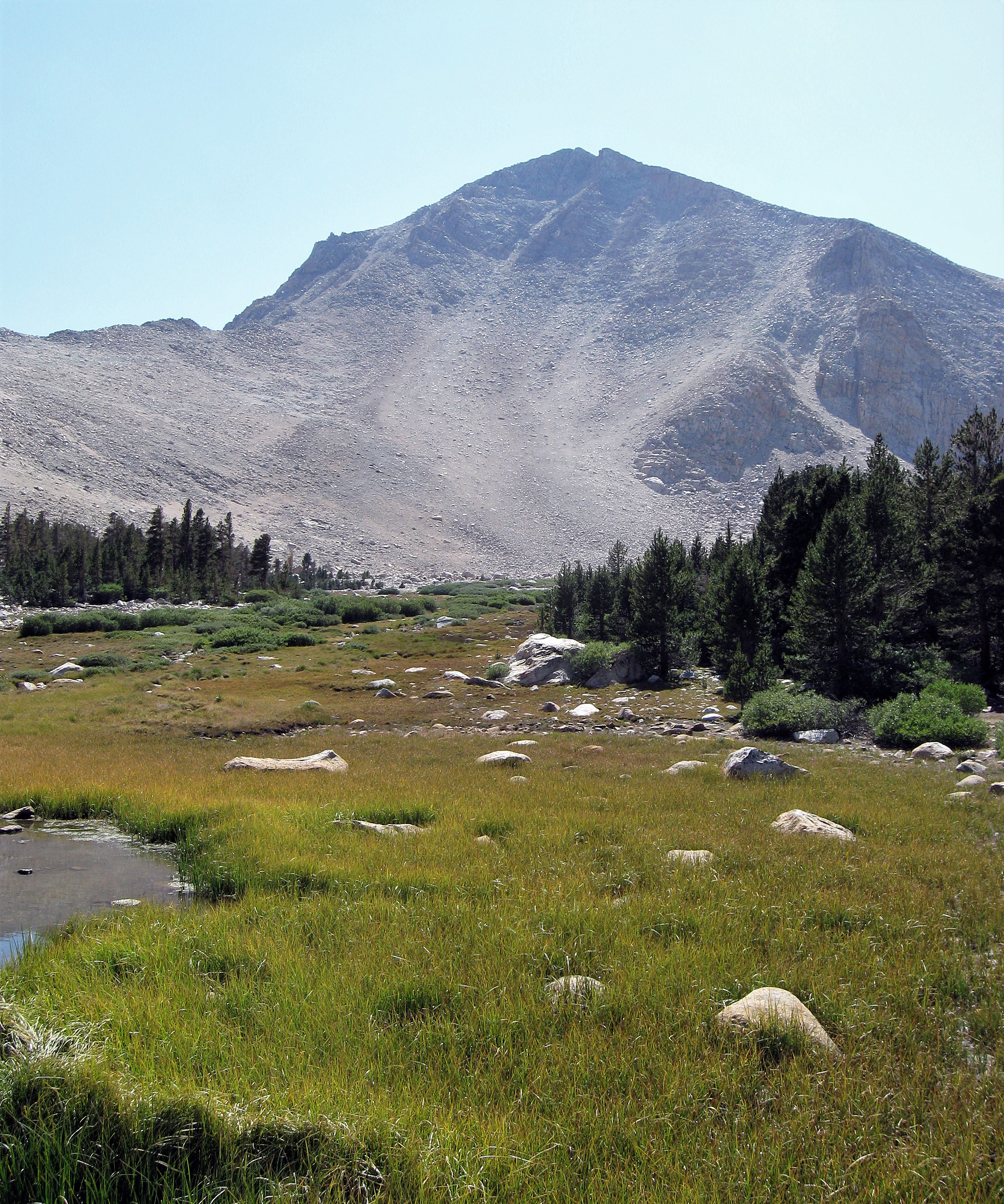

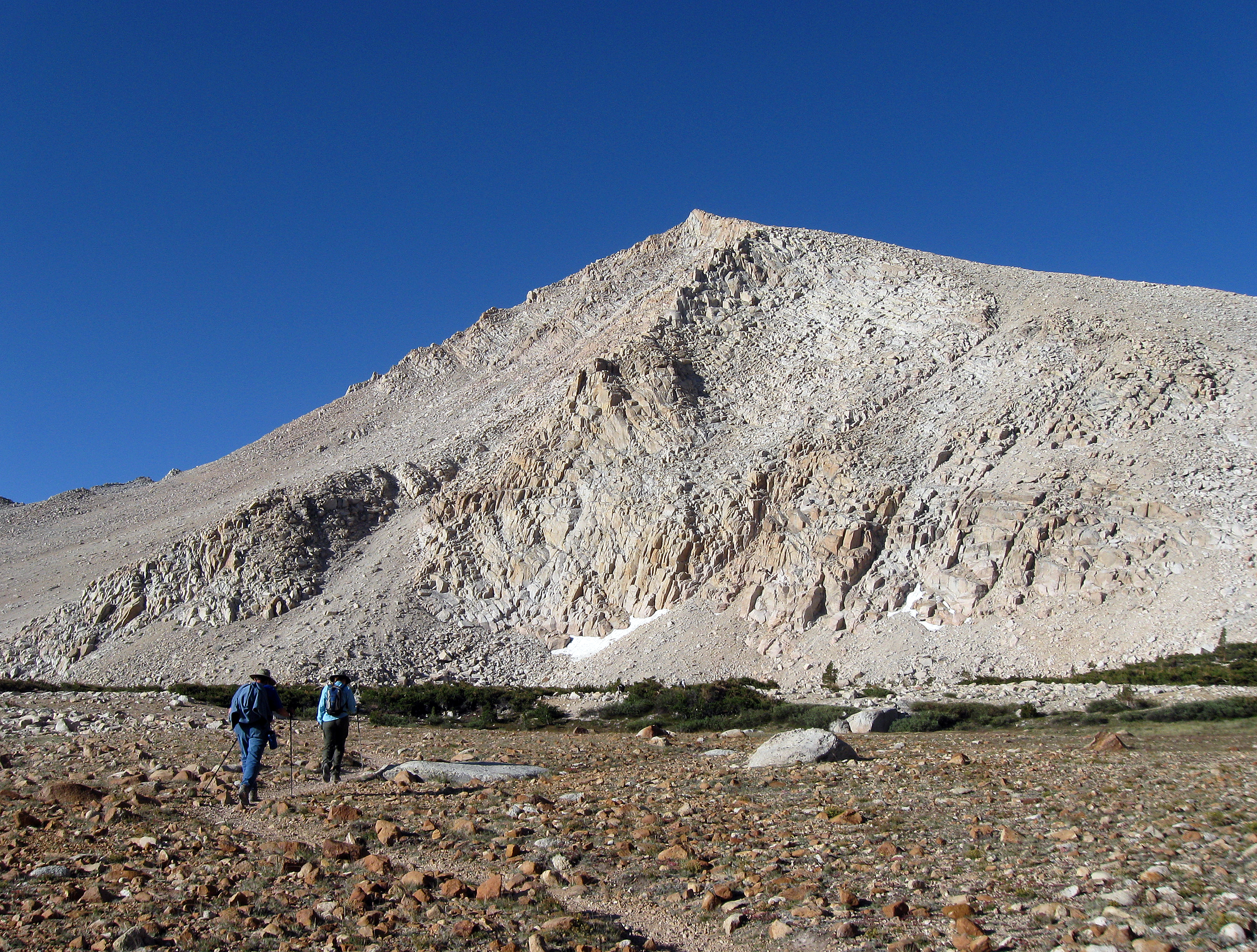

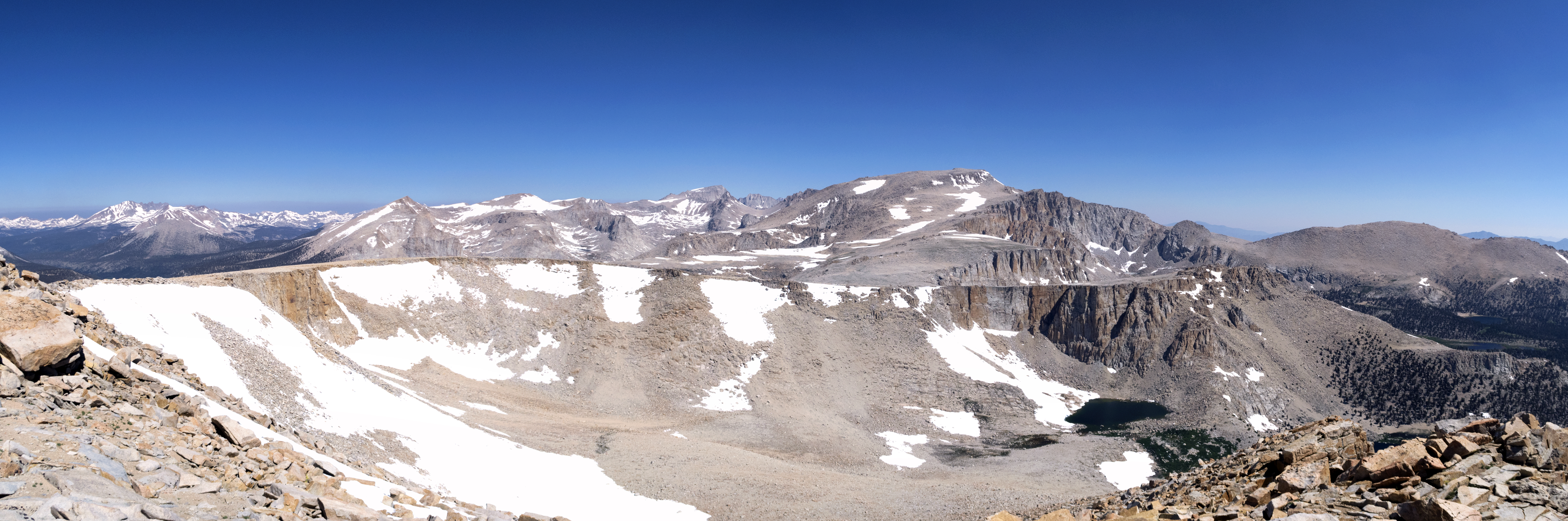
Summit view looking north into the cirque and to Mt. Langley

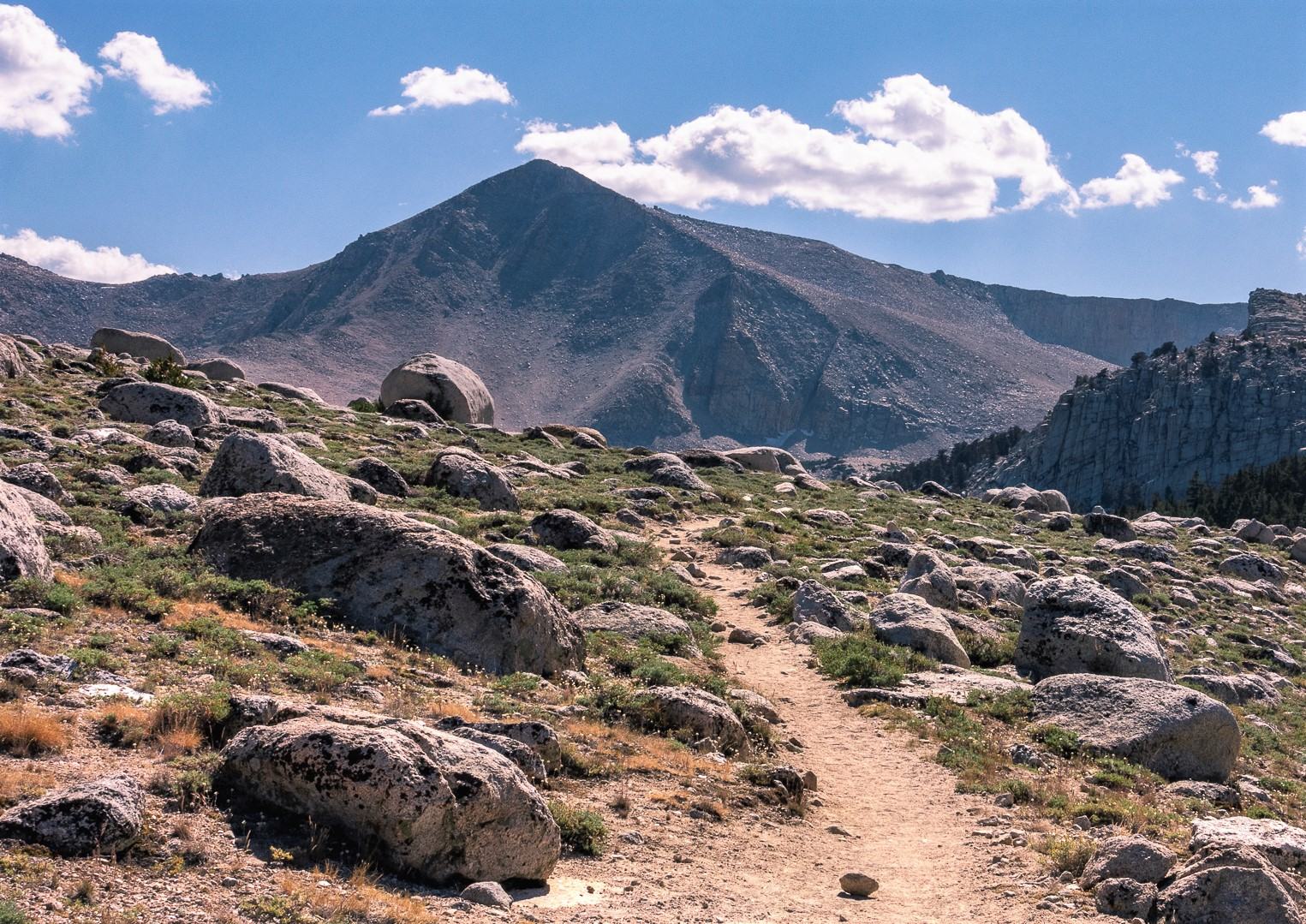
Cottonwood Lakes Trail and Cirque Peak

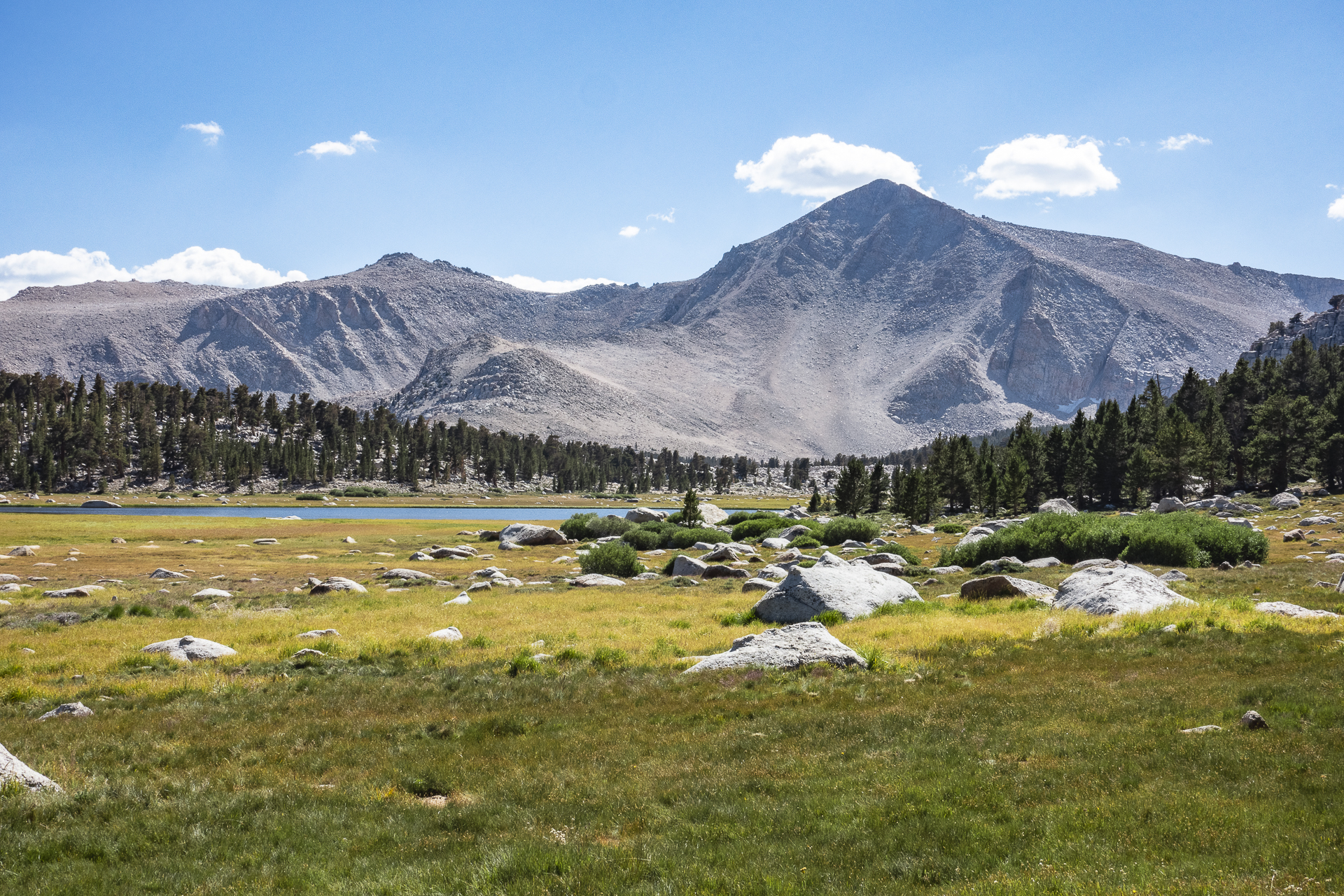

== See also ==
- List of mountain peaks of California
