= Mount Lowe (British Columbia) =

Mountain in British Columbia, Canada

- Location within British Columbia

Highest point
- Elevation: 2,194 m (7,198 ft)
- Prominence: 84 m (276 ft)
- Listing: Mountains of British Columbia
- Coordinates: 51°07′34″N 125°29′13″W

Geography
- Country: Canada
- Province: British Columbia
- Region: Bridge River Country
- District: Range 2 Coast Land District
- Parent range: Whitemantle Range
- Topo map: NTS 92N3 Whitemantle Creek

Mount Lowe is a mountain peak located East of the head of Knight Inlet and SE of Devereux Lake, British Columbia, Canada. Nearby peaks include Mount Devereux, Village Cone, Barricade Mountain, Costello Peak, Obelisk Mountain, and Cornette Peak.
