= Cirque Peak (Alberta) =

Mountain in Alberta, Canada

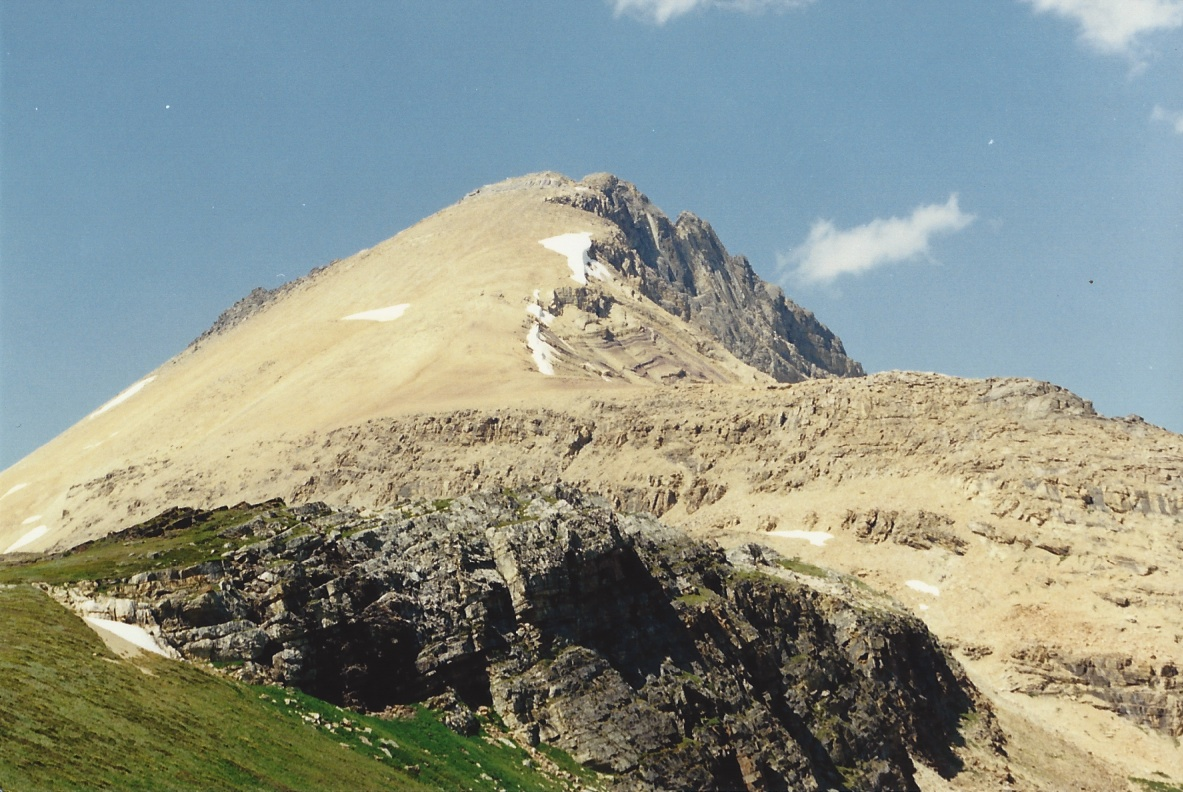
- Cirque Peak from Helen Lake, July 1994

Highest point
- Elevation: 2,993 m (9,820 ft)
- Prominence: 341 m (1,119 ft)
- Parent peak: Observation Peak
- Listing: Mountains of Alberta
- Coordinates: 51°42′00″N 116°25′04″W

Geography
- Location within Alberta
- Country: Canada
- Province: Alberta
- Protected area: Banff National Park
- Parent range: Canadian Rockies
- Topo map: NTS 82N9 Hector Lake

Climbing
- First ascent: 1899
- Easiest route: Easy Scramble

Cirque Peak is a 2,993-metre (9,820-foot) peak located directly west of Dolomite Pass in the Bow River valley of Banff National Park, in the Canadian Rockies of Alberta, Canada.

The mountain forms a cirque, hence the name.

== Scrambling route ==
The scrambling route (rated easy) begins just beyond Helen Lake which is 6 km from the Helen Lake/Dolomite Pass trail head beside the Icefields Parkway.

== Geology ==
Like other mountains in Banff Park, Cirque Peak is composed of sedimentary rock laid down during the Precambrian to Jurassic periods. Formed in shallow seas, this sedimentary rock was pushed east and over the top of younger rock during the Laramide orogeny.

== Climate ==
Based on the Köppen climate classification, Cirque Peak is located in a subarctic climate with cold, snowy winters, and mild summers. Temperatures can drop below −20 °C with wind chill factors below −30 °C.
