= Hans Kaufmann (alpine guide) =

Swiss mountain guide

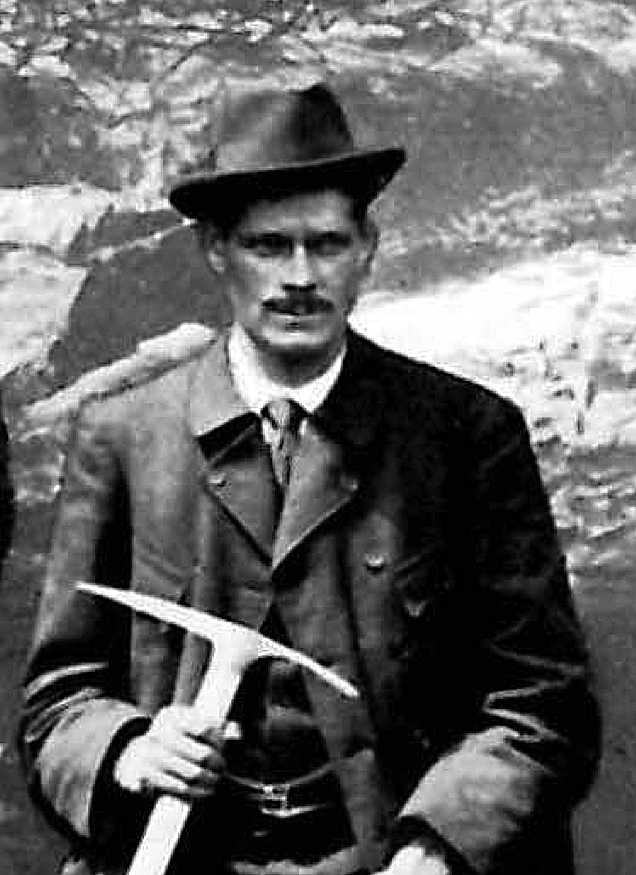
- Kaufmann ca. 1903

Personal information
- Born: December 20, 1874 Grindelwald, Switzerland
- Died: March 31, 1930 (aged 55) Interlaken, Switzerland
- Parents: Father: Peter Kaufmann (1832-1903); mother: Margaritha Baumann (1839-1803)
- Relatives: Rudolf Kaufmann (born 1875), brother; Christian Kaufmann (1872-1939), brother; Peter Kaufmann (1858-1924), half-brother.

Hans Kaufmann (20 December 1874 - 31 March 1930) was a Swiss mountain guide who served clients in the Alps, the Rocky Mountains, the Dolomites, the Carpathians, and the Andes.

== Family and early life (1874-1894) ==
Hans (Johannes) was the son of Peter Kaufmann (1832-1903) and Margaretha (née Baumann, 1839-1903). His father, called Grabenpeter or Grabipeter, was a well-established certified mountain guide during the Golden Age of Alpinism. His brothers—Friederich (Fritz; born 1878), Rudolf (born 1875), and Christian (1872-1939) as well as his half-brother Peter Kaufmann (1858-1924)--all became mountain guides.

Like his brothers, as a young boy, he tended goats and cows on the upper pastures, learning about and becoming accustomed to alpine conditions. And he worked as a porter alongside his father, Grabipeter, learning the principles of climbing and familiarizing himself with the mountains in the Bernese Oberland.

Although sledging, curling, and skating were popular winter pastimes in nineteenth-century Grindelwald, it was not until the 1890s that skis first appeared. In 1891, Gerald Fox, an Englishman who had “discovered” skiing in Scandinavia, approached Hans and his brother Ruedi asking whether they would like to try this new sport. Eager for any adventure, the two teenagers were soon climbing the lower part of the Wengeralp with skis and single ski-poles, so that they could zoom down to Grindelwald on the snow. As Hans Gertsch reported, it was not long before neighboring youngsters "requisitioned" barrel staves for makeshift skis, found old shoes which they nailed to the "skis," used packing string for bindings, and adapted broomsticks for poles. Groups would climb to the Grosse Scheidegg and then race downhill past trees and boulders without an hour of previous instruction.

== Early climbing career (1895-1897) ==
In the Gleckstein hut in 1869. From left to right, front row: Almer’s wife, daughter, son, Christian Almer; back row: Dr. Huber, Almer’s son; Hans Kaufmann (tallest individual), and another porter.

After rigorous study, practical experience as a porter, as well as written and oral examinations, Kaufmann earned his climbing license on 24 June 1895, at the age of 21. Early entries in his Führerbuch include client testimonies about successful climbs to the Gleckstein Hut and Wetterhorn summit.

Christian Almer, (1826-1898), who planned to celebrate his golden wedding anniversary with an ascent of the Wetterhorn, asked Kaufmann to serve as porter. So on Friday 20 June 1896, Almer (age 70), his wife Margaretha (age 71), his eldest daughter, two sons (Peter and Hans), the village physician (Dr. Huber), a photographer, Hans Kaufmann, and another porter left Grindelwald, spent the night at the Gleckstein hut, and rested the following day. On Sunday, soon after midnight, the group left the hut, "arriving just hours later on the summit . . . A high wind and intense cold prevented a long or convivial stay, but the weather was otherwise good and Almer's friends in Grindelwald could see the party being photographed on the summit." "Gritli" (née Margaretha Kaufmann in 1824) was a distant relative of Hans Kaufmann.

== Professional climbing career (1898-1901) ==
During the early years for his career, Kaufmann guided clients to the summits of the Wetterhorn, the Jungfrau, the Mettenberg, and Blüemlisalp (3,661 m / 12,011 ft), frequently crossing glaciers (e.g. Eismeer, and resting at alpine huts (Gleckstein, Bergli, Concordia). In August 1899 he climbed in the Mont Banc, and Dent du Giant in the French Alps with Otto Schink. For two weeks in August 1899, he worked with Hans Brawand guiding F. E. Robinson, H. N. Fairbanks, Rev. W Stock, Englishmen, to several local peaks, including the Eiger. He praises Kaufmann for his climbing skills and ability to speak English. Dr. Hawkins from Aldershot, England, however, said that Kaufmann "has one fault, viz. that he drinks too much water when he is climbing. When I told him so, he said: 'Not too much for me, sir!' He may be right?"

== In the Canadian Rockies (1901 & 1902) ==
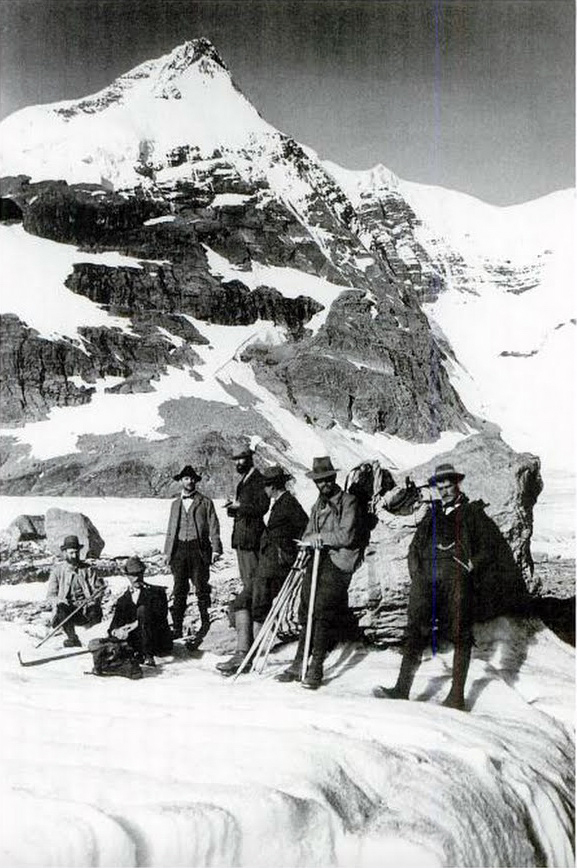
”Breakfast-place at the foot of [Mt.] Freshfield” (1901) with Norman Collie’s group, including Hans Kaufmann (right).

Although his brother Christian had arrived in Canada with Edward Whymper and three other guides in June 1901, Hans Kaufmann travelled to the Rockies independently a month later. After establishing a base camp at Moraine lake in the Valley of the Ten Peaks with H. Woolley, Hugh E. H. Stutfield, and George M. Weed, Kaufmann spent a week (18-25 July 1901) guiding the group to the summits of Mounts Pinnacle, Temple, Neptuak, and Shagowa [later Mount Tuzo]. They also made an unsuccessful attempt to climb Mount Hungabee, turning back 100 feet before the summit because of darkness and snow conditions. Among the other climbs were ascents to Mount Victoria with E.W.D. Holway (Aug. 1), Mount Cascade with John Paton (Aug. 5), Mount Lefroy with Barrett Wendell, Jr. (Aug 30), as well as Mount White with Constance and Harriet Booth (Aug. 20). At the end of each climbing season Hans returned to Grindelwald, as did his brother Christian.

In 1902, Kaufmann spent six weeks in the Rockies with J. Norman Collie, Herman Woolley, Hugh E. M. Stutfield (1858-1929), and George M. Weed. Hans led the group to the summits of Mts. Murchison, Howse Peak, and Neptuak, and accomplished two first-ascents, working with his brother Christian: Mts. Freshfield (3,337 m / 10,948 ft) and Forbes (3,612 m / 11,850 ft). For eight weeks in July and August 1902, Christian Kaufmann guided James Outram, Collie's rival, to some of the highest peaks in Canadian Rockies. However, on one occasion, Collie's group reluctantly joined forces with Christian and Outram; so that the two Kaufmanns guided their clients to the summit of Mount Freshfield, where they might study the needed rock work to summit Mount Forbes, the challenging next peak. During the ascent of Mount Forbes, "Hans Kaufmann at one point had a lucky escape when by chance a rock came away in his hands. He only fell a few feet and managed to grab the edge go the arête in time. The ridge, according to Woolley, seemed only held together by frozen snow."

Collie and Outram put aside their rivalry and behaved like Victorian gentlemen: "At one point Collie, rather than increase the risk to his companions of being the fourth on the rope, abandoned the ascent. After Outram successfully climbed the second cliff, he sent Christian and Hans Kaufmann back down to accompany Collie up the difficult section, feeling that Collie, 'more than all the rest, deserved the gratification and honour of being the first to conquer Mount Forbes'." Outram had suggested that the two teams do an expedition together, but Collie decided against it, and the two parted: Christian and Outram headed for their spectacular ascent of Mount Bryce; Collie, his group, and Hans went toward via Bear Creek to the Freshfield glacier.

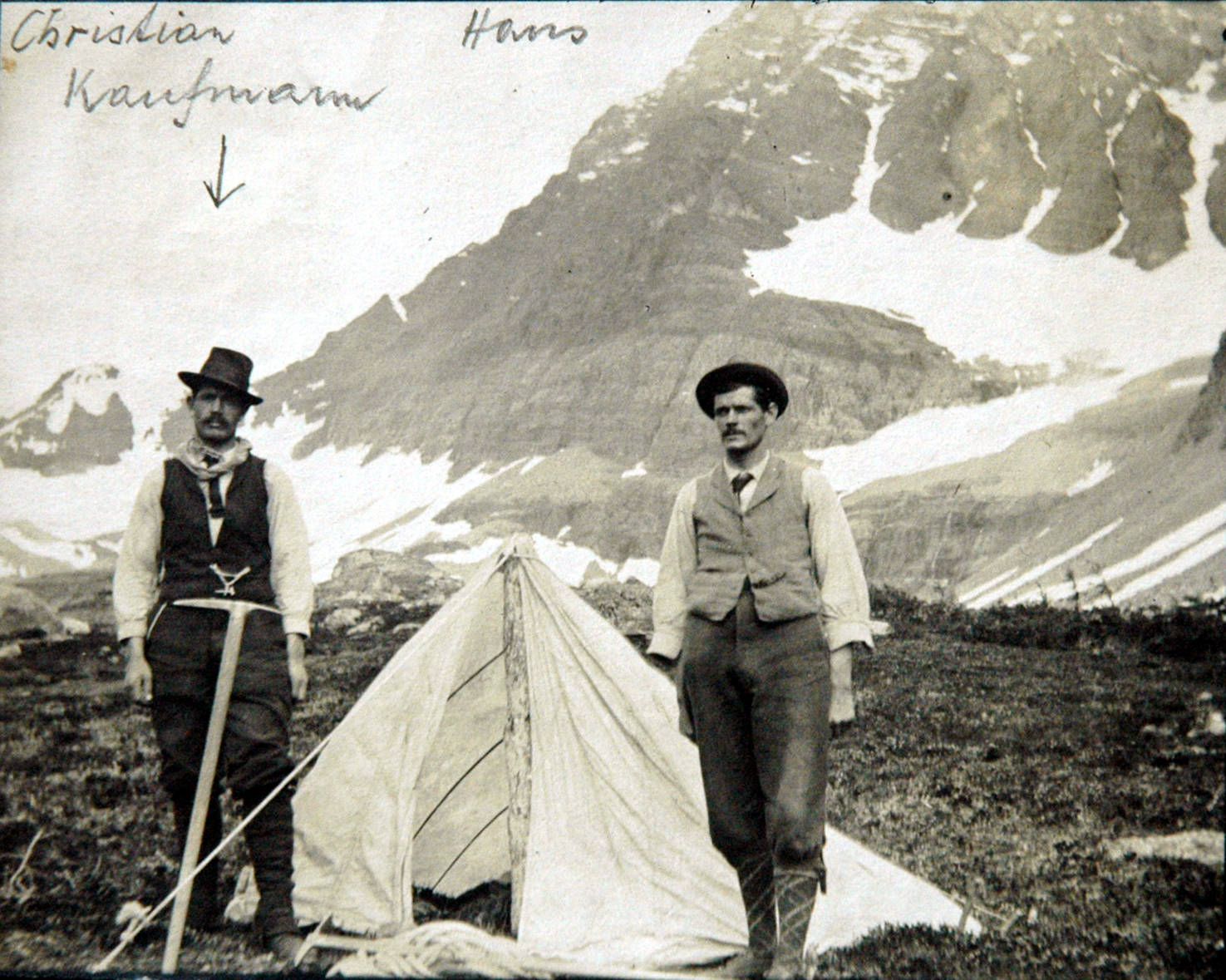
Christian & Hans Kaufmann with tent in Prospector's Valley, ca. 1902.

At one point, it was necessary to cross Bear Creek, and Collie reported: "It was Hans' first experience of fording streams on horseback, and, though brave as a lion on mountains, this sort of thing was not at all to his taste: which was not surprising, as Bear Creek even when low is always more or less of a trial to the inexperienced. However, he faced the ordeal with exemplary fortitude: only, when safe on the further side, he shook his head gravely and in his broken English enigmatically observed, 'Several times you cross it; but once is the last time'."

Later in their journey, the group encountered a forest fire that Collie surmised might have been spitefully started by Outram by preventing Hans and the others from continuing. The group solved the problem by building a raft, christened the Glacier Belle, after the lake they were to navigate, Glacier Lake. "Raft, freight, and passengers must have weighed two or three tons. . . . [W]ith a tow-rope on the bank, when towing was practical and punting, pushing, paddling, and hauling for some hours, we gradually approached the further end of the lake. The scenery grew grander as we advanced. Eastwards Mount Murchison came into view, a must imposing mass: in the opposite direction was Lyell glacier, withers attendant peaks and magnificent ice-fall brilliantly mirrored in the turquoise, or rather peacock-blue water." On their return voyage, they attached a canvas pack-cover onto two poles, making a sail to move them across the lake: Dave [the team's lumberman] was at the helm and Hans at the prow.

Although Collie was Kaufmann's employer, he clearly viewed him professional and personally as more than a personal valet: Hans "was an excellent fellow--very keen and good-tempered, and willing to do all the sorts of things, from hard work on the mountain-side to carrying gigantic logs on his back for the camp-fire, or mending boots. In short, he was everything that a British climber is wont to write (with more or less truth) in his guide's Führer Buch at the close of his season in the Alps--and more besides." Indeed, Collie's entry in Hans Kaufmann's Führerbuch reads: Hans is "an excellent rock climber with a good knowledge of snow and ice, very strong, most willing and obliging, and a charming companion."

Upon their return to Switzerland at the end of the climbing season (October 1902), Hans and Christian Kaufmann reported that the season had been most successful, saying "that many of the climbers they go out with return regularly each season. The Rockies, they think, are destined to become a second and greater Switzerland."

== In the Canadian Rockies (1903 & 1904) ==
Hans Kaufmann began his 1903 season by climbing Mount Stephen with Gouverneur Paulding (1829-1931), a member and secretary of the American Geological Society. Ascents of Mounts Whyte, Niblock and Lefroy followed with the world explorer, archeologist, and mountaineer, Gertrude Lowthian Bell (1868-1926), and there was a climb of Mount Victoria with Marion Porter Raymond (1881-1959), with whom Kaufmann established a long-term climbing relationship.

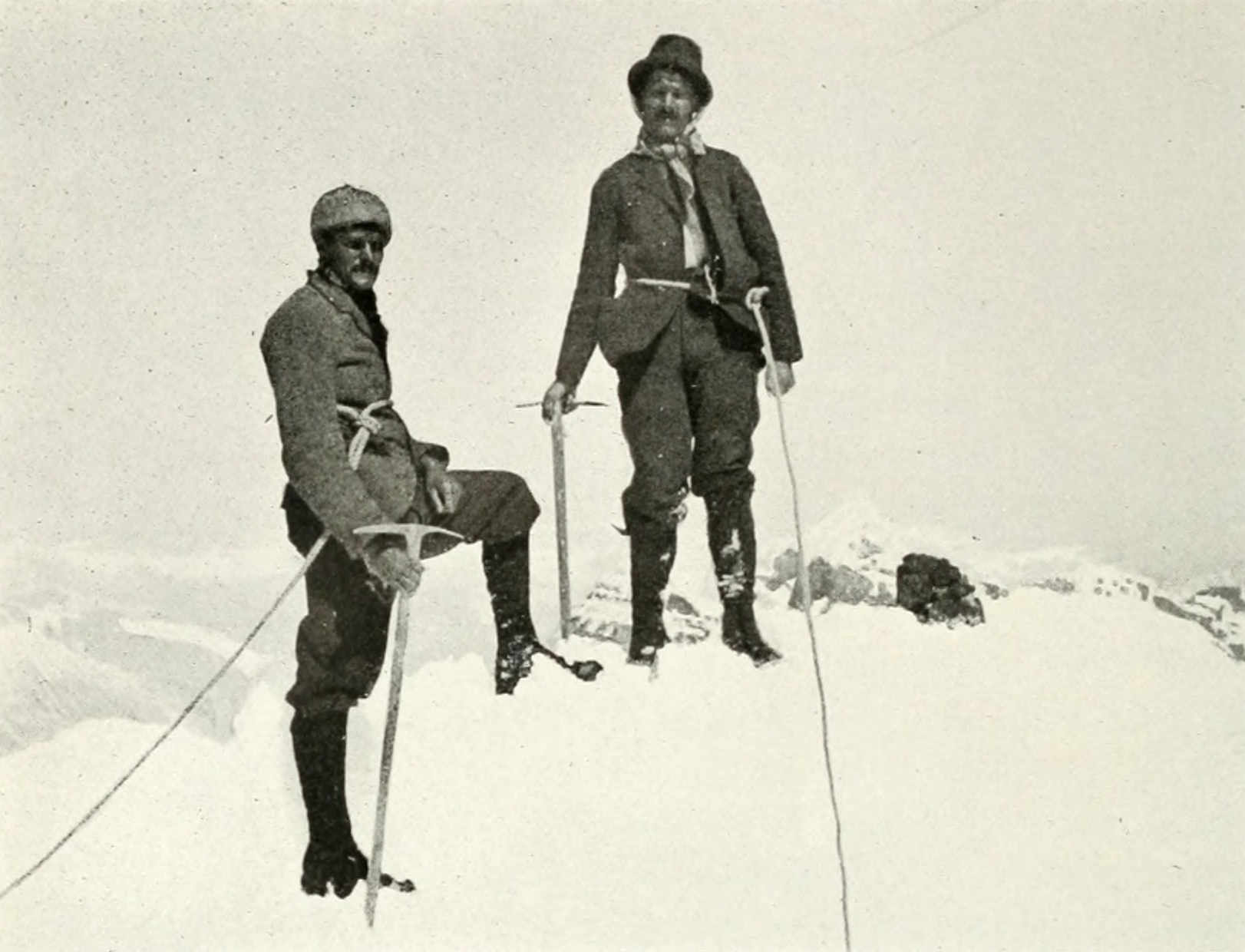
Christian and Hans Kaufmann, who accompanied Professor H. C. Parker, on the summit of Mount Hungabee. ca. 1903

However, Hans Kaufmann's most successful climb, together with his brother Christian and Herschel Clifford Parker (1862-1936), on 21 July 1903, was the first ascent of Mount Hungabee, "a magnificent peak, for many years considered almost impossible, is probably the most difficult and dangerous summit ever ascended in Canada." Parker later commented that they also climbed Mount Temple from Moraine Lake, where "Hans Kaufmann most kindly and ably assisted me in my scientific observations for the determination of altitude." Parker and August Eggers (1862-1936), led by Hans, also made first ascents of Mount Deltaform and Mount Biddle.

Hans returned to Europe in October 1903 aboard the Lake Erie, arriving in Liverpool on 12 October with his brother Christian and his fellow guides. Two weeks later, both Hans and Christian were in Grindelwald at their father's deathbed; Grabipeter died on 26 October 1903; the brothers' mother, Margaritha (née Baumann), had died earlier in the year (27 May).

Hans and Christian—as well as Edward Feuz, Sr., Christian Häsler, Christian Bohren, and Fritz Michael—returned to Canada as official mountain guides of the Canadian Pacific Railway Company in April 1904. On 5 June 1904 Christian and Hans guided John Duncan Patterson, later the third president of the Alpine Club of Canada, to a first ascent of Mount Ball (3,311 m /10,863 ft). The following month they guided Hudson Stuck, Archdeacon of Alaska and future first ascendant of Denali, on Mount Victoria.

In 1904, at the Chalet Lake Louise, the brothers also met Gertrude Emily Benham, an English mountaineer and traveler, who had climbed many Alpine peaks in her youth with her father. She employed both Kaufmanns and climbed numerous peaks with them: Mts. Lefroy, Victoria, Whyte, Stephen, Temple, Assiniboine, as well as Pope's Peak, Yamnee Peak, Shappee Peak, and an unknown summit; four were first ascents. One of their most strenuous expeditions took place in late August 1904. The three left Lake Louise at midnight, crossed Abbott Pass, descended to Lake O’Hara, making their way along Cataract Valley to the summit of Mt. Stephen, reaching the top at 7:30 PM, and, finally, descending after dark to the town of Field, arriving at 3:00 AM, 27 hours after leaving Lake Louise.

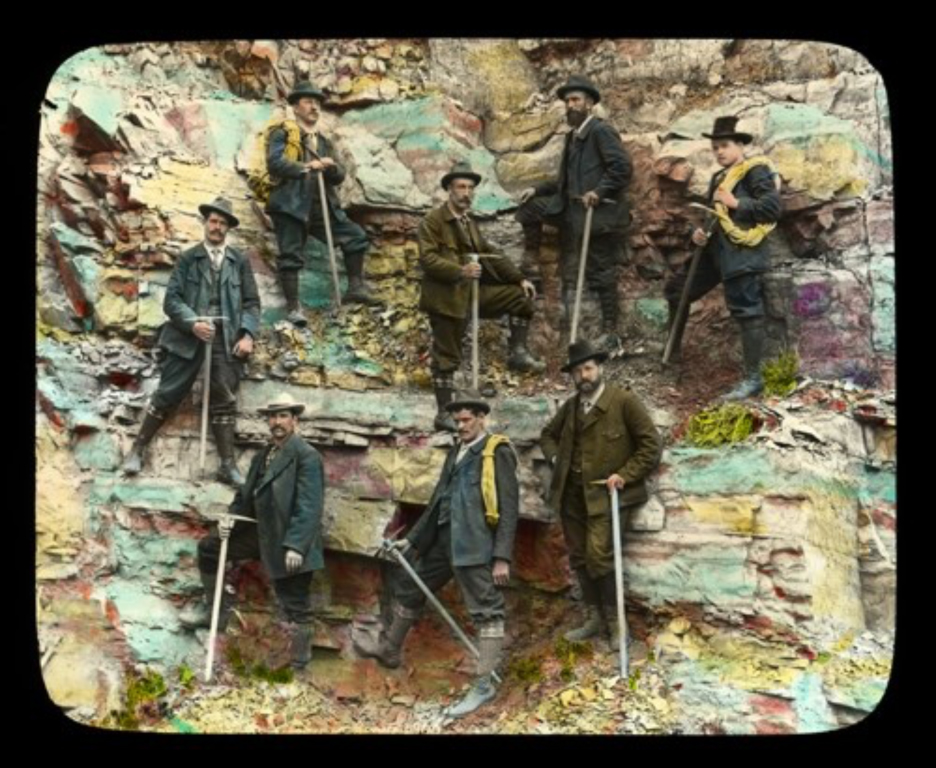
Swiss Guides employed by the CPR: Christian Kaufmann (far left); Hans Kaufmann (bottom middle), ca. 1903

Although there are conflicting accounts of the first ascent of Mt. Heejee (Peak #1 of the Ten Peaks) in 1904, this climb proved to be the most controversial of the peaks climbed by the Kaufmann brothers. Professor Charles Ernest Fay (1846-1931), a respected mountaineer, hired Hans Kaufmann to guide him to the summit, which the Geographic Board of Canada had promised would be named in Fay’s honor. Christian, on the other hand, had been employed by Gertrude Benham to climb the same mountain. On 20 July 1904 each Kaufmann set out with his client. Christian and Benham were successful; but Hans and Fay had to abandon the climb due to snowy conditions. Fay was angered that he had been beaten to the top and suspected that the Kaufmann brothers had played a trick on him. Fay was emphatic that he had been misled: “I should have probably made the first ascent of the new Mt. Fay which I missed by Hans Kaufmann’s leading me, against my protest, up Consolation Valley, while Christian led Miss Benham around by the familiar ‘Hourglass Couloir’ to its virgin summit. Hans alleged that he supposed I had your [Charles Thompson's] Mt. Little in view" (p. 123). He accused the Kaufmanns of conspiracy and demanded that the CPR dismiss them. There was solidarity among the other Swiss guides, however, that the Kaufmanns should not be fired; but apparently the CPR compromised by not renewing Hans Kaufmann's contract at the end of the 1904 season, but rehiring Christian for two more years. After numerous climbs and twelve first ascents in the Rockies from 1901-1904, Hans ended his guiding in Canada that year; Christian returned for the 1905 and 1906 seasons; and Peter Kaufmann, their half brother, guided in Canada in 1907 and, as an employee of the CPR, in 1908.

From September 1904 to August 1905, Hans Kaufmann was back in Switzerland guiding such clients as Stephen H. Pickering and Josephine Elston to the summit of the Schreckhorn. Hans later spent three weeks guiding Elston to the top of the Eiger, Jungfrau, Finsteraarhorn, Schreckhorn, Monte Rosa, and Weisshorn, before he climbed with her in Britain.

== In the Andes with A. F. Wedgwood (1905-1906) ==
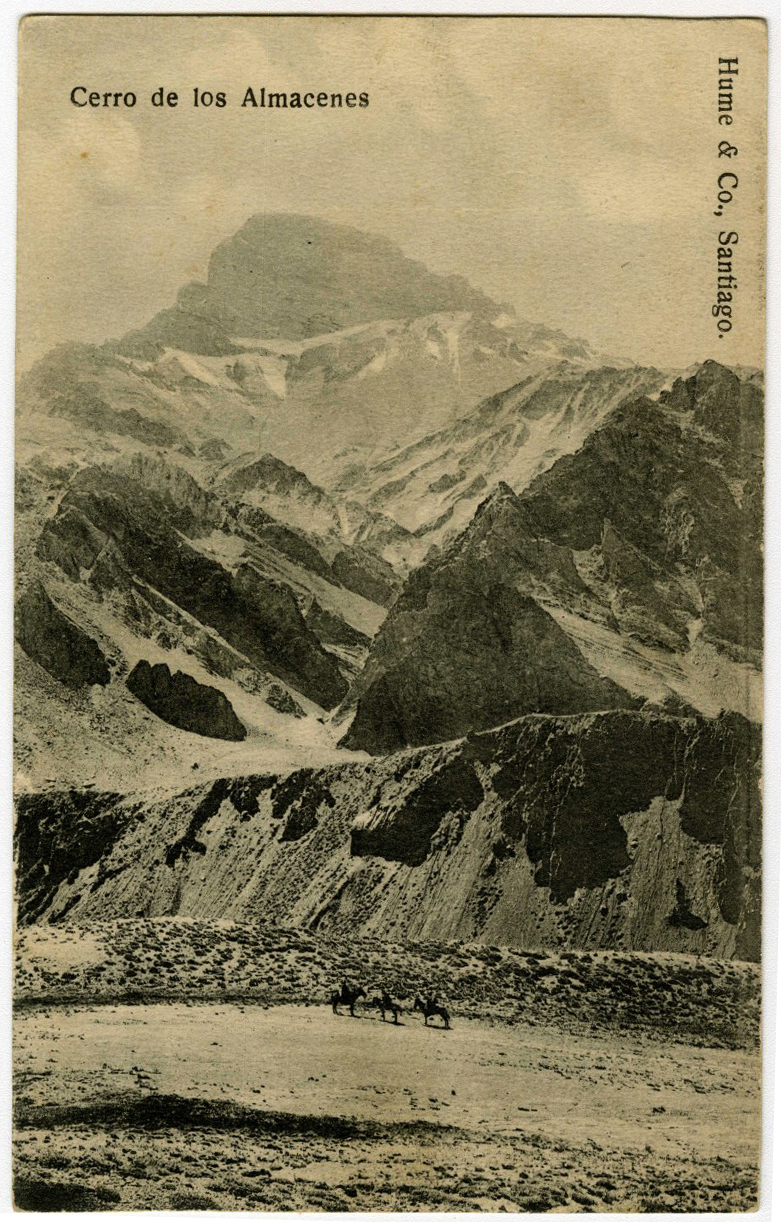
Cerro de los Almacenes (5060m / 16,204 ft): First ascent by A. F. Wedgwood and H. Kaufmann in 1905.

Having made his acquaintance in Canada, Kaufmann climbed with Arthur Felix Wedgwood (1877-1917) in the Andes. During a fireside gathering of the 1910 encampment of the Canadian Alpine Club, Wedgwood spoke about his earlier climbs with Kaufmann in Chile and Argentina. He and Kaufmann had successfully climbed two peaks in the Horeones Valley, Cerro Tolosa (5370m / 17,500 ft) and a first ascent of Cerro de los Almacenes (5060m / 16,204 ft). They also hired "a Chilean bearer who did good work and was able to sleep out at 17,000 feet with only a rug as protection." They could only take the pack mules to a height of 14,000 ft because at that altitude the animals suffered from altitude sickness. Their attempt to climb Aconcagua (6,960m / 22,837 ft), the highest mountain in the Americas, did not go as well. Their strategy was to establish three camps at 14,000, 17,000, and 20,000 feet, and from the highest camp they made "dashes for the top, but both times lost their way, while on a third attempt the weather failed. Kaufmann became afflicted with mountain sickness and Mr. Wedgwood suffered a frozen toe." During the descent to camp, there was a serious mishap: Wedgwood "fell into a stream, getting his boots full of water which froze on his feet. As a result, he spent eight weeks in a hospital and finally lost the injured member."

== In the Cumbrian, Dolomite, and Carpathian mountains (1906-1909) ==
In July 1906, Kaufmann visited the "home of British rock climbing," the Wasdale valley in the Cumbrian mountains. In the employ of Josephine Elsdon (from London), he climbed the "classic route," including Nape's Needle and Pillar Rock, among several others.

Based on an acquaintance that began with a climb in Canada, Marion Porter Raymond, "idol of the guides," employed Kaufmann to guide her to peaks in the Dolomites during four successive years (1906, 1907, 1908, and 1909). In the Cortina, they climbed Tofana di Róses, Tofana di Ulegga, Croda da Lago, Punta de Fiames, Col Rosa Cinque Terri and Torri Inglese, and Cristello, among other peaks.

In 1907, Raymond and Kaufmann also climbed the Carpathian mountains in Hungary. Kaufmann had never been to these regions, but Raymond noted that "the Dolomite rock seemed to give him no trouble--indeed we made several of the climbs without an additional guide" and in the Carpathian region "Hans led up [the peaks] with no difficulty."

By August 1908, Marion Raymond, "one of the most celebrated women of the Alps," climbed with Kaufmann in the Bernese Alps (Gross and Klein Schreckhorn, Mönch, Wetterhorn, Eiger, and Engelhorn peaks), the Ortler Alps (Königspitze), and the Hohe Tauern range (Grossglockner), but she said that a dislocated shoulder prevented her from climbing further in England and Italy that year. In 1909 Raymond's rigorous climbing schedule with Hans also included summiting mountains in the Oetztal (e.g., Weisskugel) and in the Rhaetian Alps; they joined two local guides—Christian Zippert and Johann Piaz—to climb Piz Bernina (4,048.6 m / 13,283 ft).

== In the Bernese and Pennine Alps (1910-1928) ==
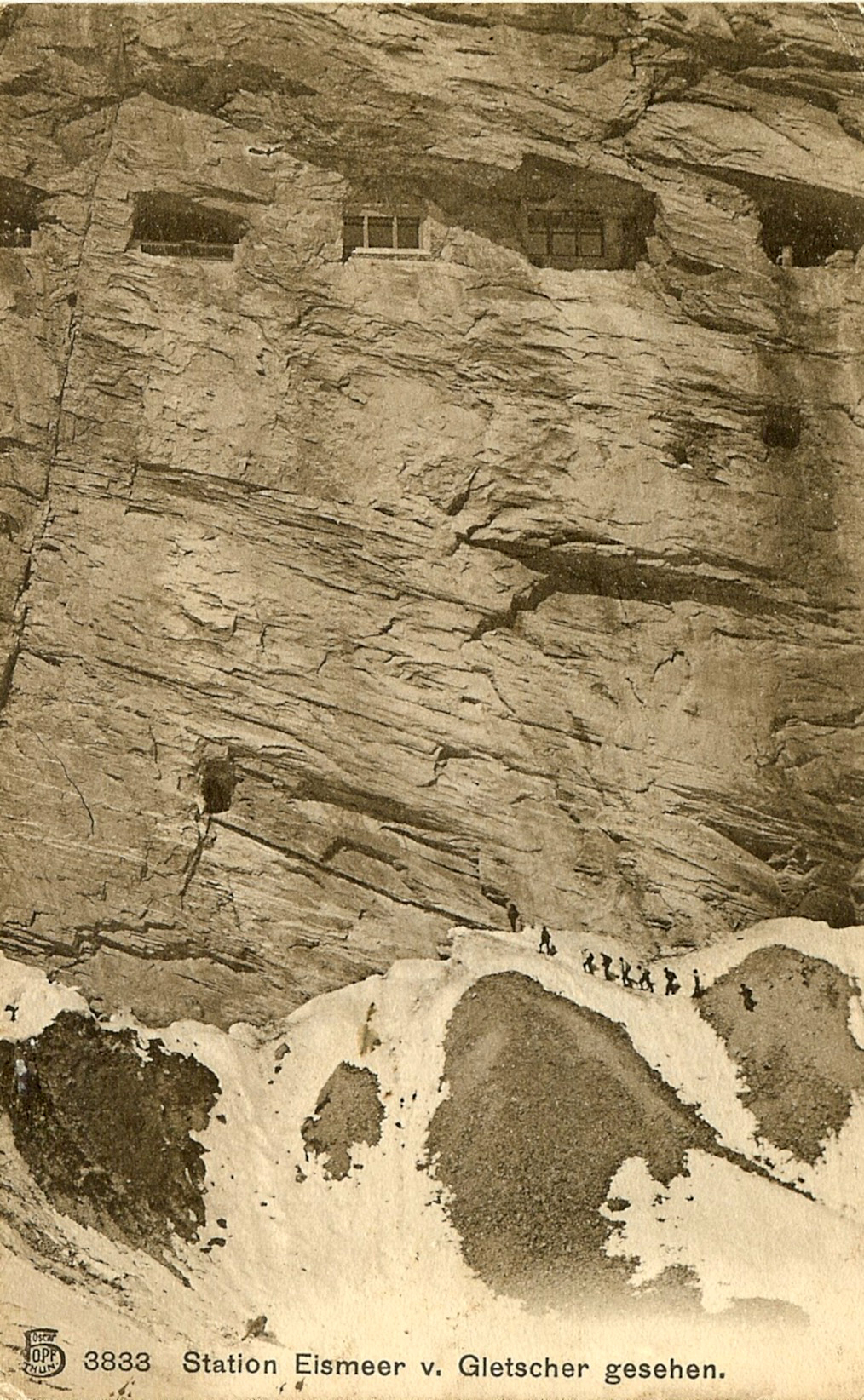
Jungfrau Railway Station Eismeer seen from glacier (ca. 1909).

Kaufmann had several significant alpine authors as clients. Godfrey W. H. Ellis (1862-1932), an expert of in Alpine books and prints, climbed the Matterhorn, Dom, Monte Rosa, and Gabelhorn with Kaufmann in 1906 and 1911; and from 26 to 29 July 1910, W. S. Jackson, author of the climbing notes in the Canada Baedeker, joined Hans and his brothers (Peter, Rudolf, and Christian in reaching the Eiger and Schreckhorn summits. In September 1911, Kaufmann acted as guide for Joel Ellis Fischer, Jr. (1891-1966)--an author of mountain climbing and president of the American Alpine Club from 1835-57—completing climbs of the Hinter Fierscherhorn, Gross Fierscherhorn, Jungfrau, and Mönch in one day, and the Wetterhorn, Nittelhorn, and Rosenhorn on another day. In 1917 and 1918, Hans guided Georges Casella (1881-1922), ironically a proponent of climbing without guides, to the summits of the Finsteraarhorn, Jungfrau, Breithorn and Trifthorn, saying Hans is "as one of the best guides of our time." This comment was high praise from someone who was just completing a seminal work on the history, tools and techniques of alpine climbing, L'alpinisme (1917).

With the completion of the Jungfrau Railway, Kaufmann sometimes began his climbs of the Eiger or Jungfrau not just from the Eiger Gletscher station (finished in 1898) but from the Eismeer stop (1905) and the Jungfraujoch terminus (1912) itself. For example, Kaufmann guided Stuart D. Morris with Edith and Gladys Hunt "up the Jungfrau from Jungfraujoch . . . [starting] at 6:30, [reaching] the summit at 5:50 and getting back to the Jungfrau station at 9:50."

Kaufmann's climbing clearly declined during the war years (July 1914 - November 1918). Among the individuals who did climb was John Pearce (1866-1952), the Vicar of Wanborough, Surrey, England.

Hans had been a very capable skier and ice skater, so that he often served as an instructor. In fact, Gerald Fox, who had introduced skiing to Grindelwald in 1891 and who had inspired Hans and his brother Ruedi to try the sport, visited the village in 1926 with his own children. With great satisfaction, Gerald saw his fifteen-year-old son Hubert, learn to ski from Hans and Ruedi Kaufmann.

Hans Kaufmann on Upper Grindelwald Glacier with English Tourists, ca. 1908.

Throughout his career, Hans Kaufmann had numerous female clients. Aside from Marion P. Raymond and Josephine Elsdon in earlier years, he guided members of the Ladies Alpine Club, such as Elaine Huth from 1924 to 1929. Huth climbed more than two dozen mountains with Hans, including the Jungfrau, Eiger, Wetterhorn, and Schreckhorn. She left "beautifully written, annotated and illustrated diary" of her travels and climbs. The six sets of typed accounts of climbing holidays in the Alps, many in the company of Hans Kaufmann, have been preserved.

In June 1928, Lady Ruby Florence Mary Baring and her daughter Rosemary Baring were Kaufmann's clients for a climb of the Jungfrau. Kaufmann gave Rosemary, who had not really climbed before, "a few lessons in rock climbing during their week in Grindelwald." Having given her daughter into the charge of Kaufmann during the climb, Lady Cromer praised him, for "not only has he inspired her with every confidence, which I fully share, but . . . together with his amazing style and wise experience, has helped her to benefit to the full by his kindly tuition." The twenty-year-old Rosemary shared her mother's enthusiasm for Kaufmann's instructive skills: "He is so kind and encouraging and gives one such confidence in his great skill and strength that I am looking forward to climbing many more peaks under his guidance." She was not able to do any further climbs with Kaufmann, but she became active in alpine clubs and travelled to Canada in 1930 to climb Mount Mary Vaux (Maligne Lake group), Mount Tupper (Silkirks), and Mount Edith Cavell with Noel Ewart Odell and Colin Grant Crawford. In recognition of her achievements, the Royal Geographical Society (London) made her a member.

== Final years (1929-1930) ==
Obituary for Hans Kaufmann, Swiss mountain guide (1930).

In 1929, Kaufmann's final climbs included traversing the Gross Schreckhorn and reaching the summits of the Mettenberg, Mönch, and Jungfrau with R. P. Mears, author of the definitive article, "The Climbing Rope Defined."

Hans Kaufmann died at the hospital in Interlaken on 31 March 1930, at the age of 55, of consequences related to appendicitis. His coffin was returned to his home (at Spätenmatten) in Grindelwald and then carried from there to the Grindelwald cemetery. At his funeral, Dr. Paul Arni, who had frequently climbed with Hans, gave a eulogy that praised Kaufmann as a remarkable mountain guide of a passing generation, "a shining example of unconditional loyalty, efficiency and fearlessness in danger, noble and distinguished disposition who will leave lasting memory."

== Legacy ==
His passing was noted in the New York Times: "The world-famous Alpine guide, Hans Kaufmann, died yesterday at Grindelwald, Switzerland, after an operation for appendicitis. He was 55 years old. He had climbed the highest peaks in the Rockies, Andes, and European Alps and was known to many prominent American alpinists, who always engaged him for difficult climbs because of his knowledge, sure-footedness and endurance. During the last thirty years, he saved lives of more than fifty alpinists, including many Americans and Canadians. He died poor, as he would never except gifts of money from patrons."

The Kaufmann brothers were honored to have a mountain with twin summits in the lower Mistaya valley of Alberta officially named Kaufmann Peaks after them: Hans (10,200 ft.) and Christian (10,151 ft.).
