= Peter Kaufmann (Alpine guide) =

Swiss mountain guide

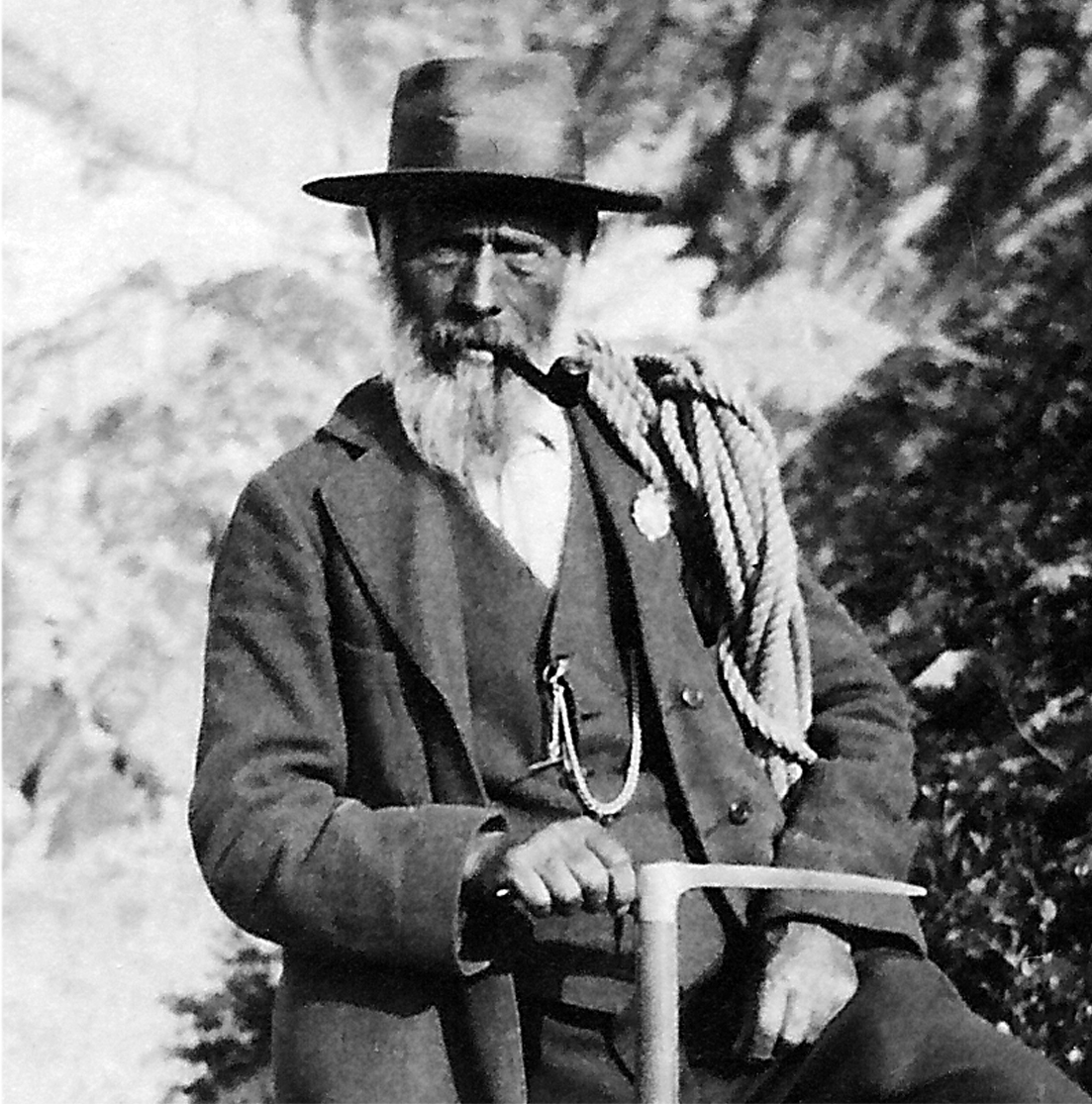
- Kaufmann ca. 1914

Personal information
- Born: 17 January 1858 Grindelwald, Switzerland
- Died: 14 October 1924 (aged 66) Grindelwald, Switzerland
- Spouse: Maria Elise von Allmen (1860-1938)
- Children: Peter Kaufmann (1886-1971), mountain guide, ski instructor; Fritz Kaufmann (1902-1978), mountain guide, railway employee
- Parents: Father: Peter Kaufmann, Sr. (1832–1903), nicknamed "Grabipeter"; Mother: Katherina Jaggi (1830-1861)
- Relatives: Christian Kaufmann (1872-1939), half-brother, mountain guide; Hans Kaufmann (1874-1930), half-brother, mountain guide

Peter Kaufmann (17 January 1858 - 14 October 1924) was a Swiss mountain guide during the silver age of Alpinism (1865–1882) and the early twentieth century, who guided amateurs, experienced climbers, and several notables across glaciers, over mountain passes, and to the summits in the Swiss Alps, the Canadian Rockies, and the Selkirks.

== Family and early life (1858-1879) ==
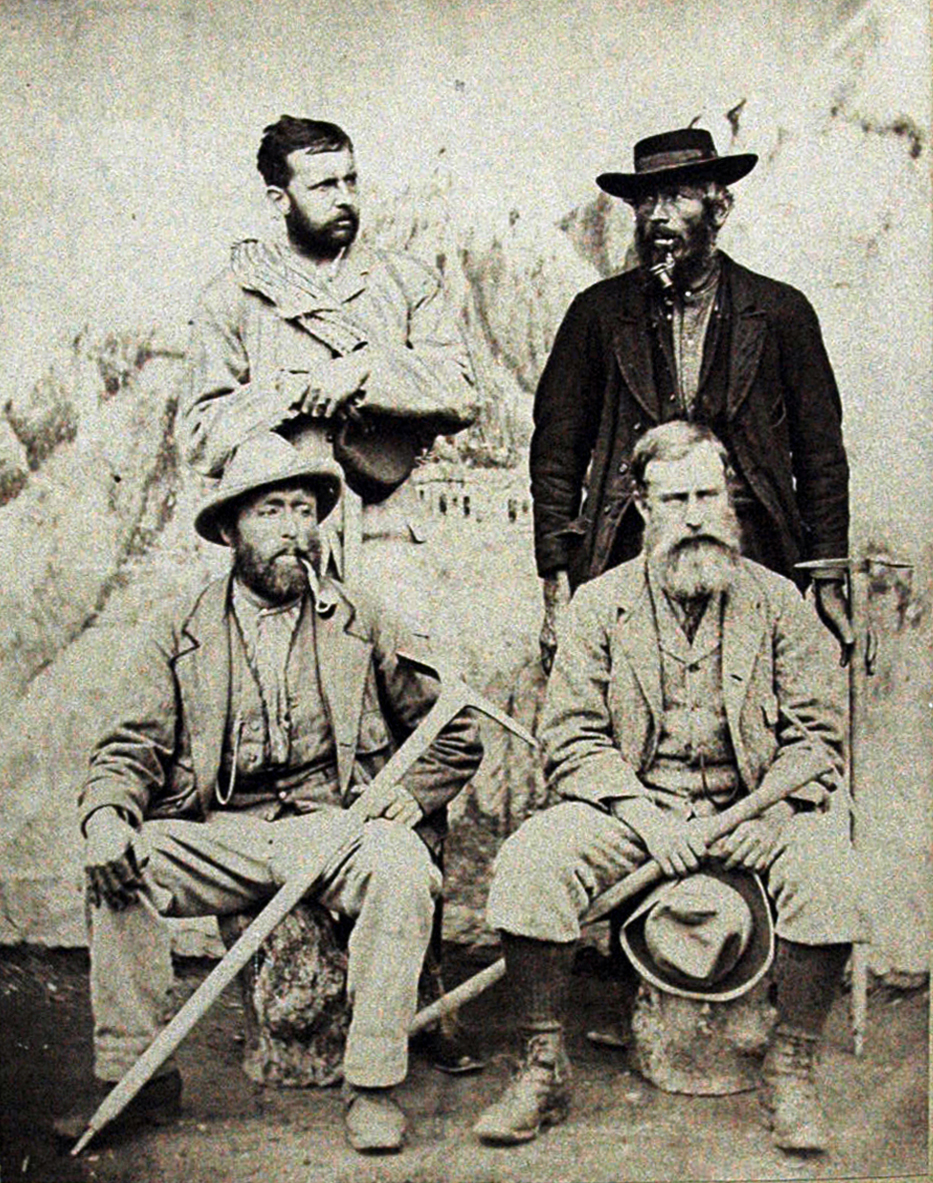
Peter Kaufmann, Sr. (Grabipeter, 1832-1903, standing right) with client Frederick Gardiner (1850-1919, standing left); Peter Knubel (1832-1919, seated left) and Charles Pilkington (1850-1918, seated right). 1877.

Peter Kaufmann was born in his family's house in Grindelwald and named after his father, Peter Kaufmann (born 21 May 1832 – died 26 October 1903) whose nickname "Grabipeter" referred to the location of the house in which he was born, the im Graben region of Grindelwald. When Peter was born, his father (Grabi Peter) was already a certified and established mountain guide. Peter's father was an active participant in the Golden Age of Alpinism (1854–1865) and climbed with mountaineers and guides such as William Robertson (1839–1892), James Surtees Phillpotts (1839–1930), Charles Pilkington (1850–1919), Richard Pendlebury (1847–1902), Peter Knubel (1832–1919), and Frederick Gardiner (1850–1919). Peter's mother, Katherina Kaufmann-Jaggi (1830–1861), who had married Grabi Peter on 2 April 1852, died at age 31, in consequence to giving birth to her daughter, Anna. Peter was three years old, so that he hardly knew his mother. Three years later on 25 November 1864, his father, Grabipeter, married Margaretha Baumann (born 11 March 1839 – died 27 May 1903); they had thirteen children together, and the sons—Peter's half-brothers—all became mountain guides, most notably, Christian (1872–1939) and Hans Kaufmann (1874–1930).

From an early age, Peter Kaufmann had not only herded cows and goats on steep slopes requiring a sense of balance but also learned essential climbing skills from his father, who taught him how to “read” the cliffs, the snow, the ice, and the weather. At the age of nineteen, Peter applied for a porter certificate, and, then with experienced guides, including his father, he gained practical climbing experience, which required carrying heavy loads such as provisions, ladders, and photographic gear.

== Climbing career (1879-1906) ==
The 1887 photograph of the mountain guides of Grindelwald show both Peter Kaufmann Sr. (upper left) and his son, Peter Kaufmann (lower right). They resembled each other their entire lives: Photos of Grabi Peter on left; and Peter Kaufmann on right.

In March 1879, Peter Kaufmann began his own career as a certified mountain guide. He had successfully fulfilled the requirements of the licensing body for Swiss guides in Interlaken. After instruction in various matters connected with the mountains, their geography, as well as the dangers connected with snow, ice, glaciers, and rock such as “the perils of couloirs, hidden crevasses, bergschrunds, and snow bridges,” he had been schooled in first-aid, including treatment and careful transportation of the injured. Moreover, he was expected to know how to avoid accidents and how to act prudently in the event of one. He was required “to be thoroughly acquainted with the mountains of his particular district,” the Bernese Alps, and, in a climbing test, he had to demonstrate his knowledge of the routes, the times needed for ascents, the position of peaks and passes, the use compasses and maps, ropes and ice-picks, such as step-cutting. Moreover, he needed “to show that he had in him the makings of a complete counselor and guardian angel to the climbers under his charge,” showing exemplary behavior at the club huts. After this rigorous training and testing, he was qualified to become an official mountain guide, so that the Governing Body of the District Authority in Interlaken certified him as a licensed guide and issued a paginated, leather-bound book (Führerbuch) in which his future clients could write their comments.

As a social and professional tool, Kaufmann's business (visiting) card gives his name, his profession (in German and English), and his contact address.

Spanning his 45-year career as a mountain guide, Peter Kaufmann's 224-page Führerbuch offers a chronological list of his climbs and clients. This official leather-bound record-book, about the size of a modern paperback, contains testimonies from Peter's clients whom he guided across glaciers, over mountains, and to summits. These comments in the Führerbuch were annually reviewed for quality by an official governmental agency. The best entries give details about each climb: the routes, the mountain names, the time climbed, the weather, the guide's qualities, and the memorable occurrences. Although the entries in Führerbücher generally give positive reviews of the guide's performance, it is remarkable that every one of Peter Kaufmann's 166 reviews has a positive tone.

Upon numerous occasions, Peter and his father worked together guiding climbers. For example, on 17 August 1886, they led E. Leveson Calverley (1864-1940; Newton Abbot, Devonshire, England) to the summit of the Schreckhorn (13,378 ft.). Mr. Levenson commented in Kaufmann's Führerbuch that “the snow was bad and we only reached the summit at 12:00. A snowstorm began at 11:30 and lasted for 24 hours, forcing us to spend the night on a narrow snow ledge on the lower arête. We reached the hut at 12 noon on 18 August, having been absent 34 hours. Kaufmann was very careful & attentive & nobly assisted his father in the descent, which was very difficult owing to the fresh snow.”

On 3 January 1885, Peter Kaufmann married Maria Elise von Allmen from Stechelberg. She came to Grindelwald in 1883 at the encouragement of Pastor Gottfried Strasser because of her skills in silk-weaving (Seidenweberei). She had nine children with Peter, all of whom outlived her. The identification page of his Führerbuch describes Peter as a dark-haired man about 5’ 7’’ (173 cm) tall. His clients mention his great strength and stamina. And several compliment Peter on his ability to speak English, an important skill in attracting patrons and in communicating with climbers. Some clients also said that Peter was a gracious host in the mountain huts and a good cook.

During his earliest years, Peter climbed as second guide with his father (Grabi-Peter); then, as a mature adult, he guided climbers with his brothers, including his half-brothers, Rudolf (born 1875) and Hans (1874–1930), as well as Christian Kaufmann (1872–1930). His Führerbuch makes it clear that he not only climbed the Wetterhorn (12,142 ft) and the Jungfrau (13,642 ft) more than a hundred times, but also made numerous ascents of the Schreckhorn, the Finsteraarhorn, and the Eiger (13,020 ft) as well as peaks in the Canadian Rockies and Selkirks.

Peter Kaufmann with client on the summit of the Wetterhorn (ca. 1906)

Generally from the upper middle classes, Kaufmann's clients came from various professions and had different reasons for climbing. Some sought adventure and wanted to prove themselves with a challenging climb or enhance their mountaineering skills; others wanted to experience the beauty and power of nature first-hand; still others were pursuing personal, professional, scientific, or photographic interests. Several prominent clients wrote testimonies into Peter Kaufmann's Führerbuch: Frank Vanderstrucken (July 1880), an American composer and conductor; William Woodman Graham (September 1887), Charles Pilkington (July 1877), and Friederick Gardiner (July 1877), accomplished mountain climbers; Arthur Wehrli (September 1899), a Swiss photographer and postcard publisher; Francis Ysidro Edgeworth (July 1891), a political economist; the Lindts (August 1888 & July 1890), chocolatiers and apothecaries from Bern; Archibald Philip Primrose (July 1900), a former Prime Minister of Great Britain; Lionel de Rothschild (July 1900), a banker, politician, and zoologist; W. J. Haslam (August 1903), a headmaster of New College, Harrogate; Hugh William Acton (September 1905), a professor of tropical medicine.

Daniel P. Rhodes of Boston, MA, who climbed three times with Kaufmann (in July 1899, 1900, and 1902), reaching many local summits (Wetterhorn, Eiger, Jungfrau, Finsteraarhorn, Schreckhorn, Mönch, and Vierscherhörner), described his climbs in A Pleasure-Book of Grindelwald:

“As for Peter and me, we have slept many nights on the same damp straw in a Swiss Alpine Club-hut, and drunk from the same cup of half-frozen wine in a chill morning wind. I have watched him by lantern-light cutting steps with his axe in the hard ice-slopes of the Eiger; I have seen him clinging like a fly to precipitous rock-walls, where he would eventually find a place of safety and then pull me across at the end of the rope. When I was quite new to the mountains, he has carefully placed my clumsy toes in little crevices the rock which they could not find for themselves; and one day when we were un-roped, and I was foolish enough to attempt a sitting-down glissade of a slope of hard névé [snow melted and then frozen hard on the surface in a crust of varying depth] he tried to throw himself in front of my body after I had accumulated the speed of an express train. It was finally my own ice axe which stopped me, but nobody in the party was so concerned about the incident as Peter. In return for all this I have done nothing remarkable for him, more than to dislodge some stones from above him in a steep rock-chimney in which we were one day climbing. The rocks went hurtling past him, one of them breaking the bowl of his pipe clean from the stem, which remained comfortably in his mouth. But in justice to us both, I ought perhaps to say that during none of our climbs has either of us been in a precarious situation”

Peter Kaufmann and his wife Marie Elise had nine children: four sons (Peter, 1886–1978; Christen, 1896–1981; Hans, 1899–1996; and Fritz, 1902–1976) and five daughters (Elise, 1885–1978; Karolina, 1888–1966; Emma, 1891–1976; Marianne, 1894–1979; and Luise, 1895–1977). When his last child was born in 1902, Kaufmann purchased half of a house on the Kreuzweg in the Moosgaden region of Grindelwald.

In October 1903, Peter Kaufmann's father (Grabi Peter) died in Grindelwald at the age of 71. The obituary in the local newspaper described the senior Kaufmann as a tried and tested guide, who was able to follow his profession responsibly into old age. His comrades viewed him as a sincere friend and a mischievous joker, and his large family remembered him as a devoted husband and father. The obituary includes a sentimental poem, "Adieu to Peter Kaufmann" by Miriam von Kranichfeld, ending with the lines, "So slumber on in peace, Thou Veteran of the Vale! / We triumph in thy gain, our loss alone bewail!"

From 1903 to 1906, Kaufmann continued active climbing as a single guide or with Samuel Brawand, Christian Jossi, Peter Jaggi, and Fritz Kaufmann (his brother) as fellow guides. In January 1907, he and another guide led A. S. Wilson (from Bromley, England) on a winter ascent of the Eiger.

== Canadian Rockies (1907 & 1908) ==
As Swiss mountain guides employed by the CPR, Peter Kaufmann (left) and Edward Feuz, Sr., (right) sailed aboard the S.S. Lake Champlain, crossing the Atlantic from Liverpool to Quebec (May 1908).

At the turn of the century, the Canadian Pacific Railway (CPR) began to promote tourism and climbing in the Rocky Mountains after the construction of the transcontinental railroad (1885). But the fatal accident in 1896 of Philip S. Abbot, an experienced mountaineer, made it especially important to reassure climbers that ascending mountains was safe. To encourage travel to the Rockies, CPR executives began to employ Swiss mountain guides because of their expertise and reputation as knowledgeable, careful, professional climbers. In 1903, Le Blond observed that “a skillful guide [will] find . . . an easy way up a mountain previously unexplored, while the natives of the district declare the undertaking an impossible one. The Canadian Pacific Railway Company have recognized the truth of this, and have secured the services of Swiss guides for climbing in the Rockies.”

Convinced to make a journey to the Canadian Rockies by fellow guide Edward Feuz Sr., Kaufmann travelled to America in hopes of earning a good salary as a mountain guide. In the early twentieth century after the Golden and Silver Ages of Alpinism, Bernese Oberland guides—including Kaufmann—faced several difficulties finding clients: A decline in the number of English guests; a new trend to climb without guides; and an increase in competition from younger guides. So employment in Canada with the CPR offered a guaranteed income not subject to competition. Moreover, the trip from Grindelwald to Laggan could be accomplished in about three weeks.

Peter Kaufmann's two half-brothers, Christian and Hans Kaufmann, had already gained a reputation as guides promoting mountain climbing for the CPR. In fact, in 1901 Christian had travelled to Canada with the legendary Matterhorn mountaineer, writer, and artist Edward Whymper, to promote climbing and tourism for the CPR. Unlike some Swiss guides, who settled in Canada, the Kaufmanns—including Peter—“commuted” between Grindelwald and Rockies, leaving Switzerland in May and returning in September at the end of each climbing season.

Before Peter Kaufmann arrived in Canada, there had been a scandal that surrounded Kaufmann's half-brothers (Christian and Hans) and had led to Hans's dismissal as a guide from the CPR. On 20 July 1904, Gertrude Benham (1867–1938), who was an established English climber, successfully climbed Heejee Peak with Christian Kaufmann. On the same day, Hans Kaufmann and Professor Charles Ernest Fay (1846–1931) also attempted the mountain by a more difficult route but had to abandon the climb due to snowy conditions. To honor his accomplishments, Fay, a respected mountaineer, had been promised that Heejee Peak would be named in his honor by the Geographic Board of Canada, and he wanted to be the first to climb the mountain, which was to bear his name. Fay was angered that he had been beaten to the top and suspected that the Kaufmann brothers had played a trick on him. He accused the Kaufmanns of conspiracy and demanded that the CPR fire them. Hans Kaufmann's contract was not renewed, and, at the end of the 1904 season, he ended guiding in Canada; Christian, however, continued as a guide for the CPR until the end of the 1906 season. Whether Peter's half-brothers really did conspire to deny Fay the first ascent of "his" mountain remains unclear. Edward Feuz Jr., however, was convinced about the deception and looked at the two Kaufmann with great disfavor. But this incident tarnished neither Peter's friendship with the Feuzes nor his reputation or chances for success. In fact, Peter had been recruited by Edward Feuz and had traveled from Switzerland to Laggan with him and Edward Jr. Furthermore, the senior Feuz had introduced Peter to Arthur Oliver Wheeler, president of the newly founded Canadian Alpine Club, recommending him for employment.

Peter Kaufmann spent two seasons climbing in Alberta and British Columbia. On 22 May 1907, he sailed from Liverpool to Canada aboard the S.S. Lake Eire, arriving in Montreal ten days later on 1 June. He travelled with Edward Feuz Sr, the guide from Interlaken. The ship's manifest listed Kaufmann as “tourist” and Feuz as “guide,” since Kaufmann travelled to the Rockies for the experience and the possibility of employment as a guide without a CPR contract. Kaufmann and his companions crossed the flat Canadian prairie by rail from Montreal to Calgary in five days with major stops in Manitoba, Saskatchewan; from Calgary via Banff to Laggan (Lake Louise station) was an additional three-hour rail journey.

Peter Kaufmann on the summit of Castor Peak (8282 ft.), a mountain that is part of the Asulkan (Jupiter) Group including Mts. Pollux and Lea, in British Columbia, on 30 July 1907.

In July 1907, Kaufmann participated in the second annual encampment of the Canadian Alpine Club (ACC) in Paradise Valley. ACC encampments enabled members, especially beginners, to attempt climbs from the foot of surrounding mountains such as Mts. Temple (11,624 ft) and Aberdeen (10,341 ft). The CPR allowed their guides, such as Edward and Gottfried Feuz, to participate in the week's activities. Kaufmann, as a friend of Feuz, and others, for example, prepared ground at the foot of Mt. Aberdeen because the meadow in the valley was so wet from heavy snow and rain. Soon, however, he began working as a guide. “Peter Kaufmann, of Grindelwald, a new Swiss guide in the Canadian Rockies, was also used during the first few days of the Camp, having been sent there to get some knowledge of the mountains in the vicinity of Lake Louise. Later, he was attached to the party of B. S. Comstock, by whom he had been retained.” In June, Kaufmann guided J. P. Forde in an unsuccessful attempt to climb Mt. Pinnacle (10,070 ft.). Climbs to the summits of Eiffel Peak (10,095 ft.), Mt. Temple (11,624 ft), and Mt. White (8,708 ft) followed. And with Lowell C. Frost (from Buffalo, New York), Kaufmann climbed Mount Hungabee (11,457 ft.), crossed Wastach and Abbot Passes, traversed several glaciers, and accomplished ascents of Mt. Victoria (11,365 ft) and Mt. Park (9671 ft). On 21 July 1907, Kaufmann guided Benjamin S. Comstock, who was doing survey work on Mt. Sanford (11,600 ft). Comstock said that Kaufmann was one of the best Swiss guides, “having the essential of good judgment, skill and caution,” and he regarded him with “much esteem and respect personally, for his virtues of simple probity, uprightness and faithfulness to his charge and for the ever-considerate care with which he has looked after my interests." Kaufmann returned to Europe in October 1907 aboard the S.S. Empress of Ireland from Montreal to Liverpool.

Peter Kaufmann (right) with Boston attorney and American Alpine Club President Lewis Delafield (middle) at the Canadian Alpine Club encampment at Rogers Pass (July 1908). Kaufmann spent a month in the Rockies climbing with Delafield.

On 20 May 1908, Kaufmann sailed to America in twelve days aboard the S.S. Lake Champlain. This time he had his own contract with the CPR, traveling with Edward Feuz Sr., Edward Feuz Jr., and Gottfried Feuz; the ship's manifest listed all four men as guides. His contract with the CPR stipulated that he was hired as a mountaineering guide for service in the Rocky Mountains from 1 May until the end of the season, 30 September. The company paid round-trip second-class expenses for the guide's journey as well as his board and lodging during his employment. The contract stated that the CPR reserved the right to dismiss him if he exhibited insobriety or disobedience. And, in the event of such a dismissal, he would forfeit the reimbursements of his journey home. Moreover, it stipulated that any disputes between the company and the guide would be settled by the chief Swiss Consul in Canada, whose decision would be final. Kaufmann began his 1908 stay in Canada at the third ACC encampment, this time on Rogers Pass in the Selkirk Mountains of British Columbia. In July and August, he guided clients to the summits of Mt. LeFroy (11,231 ft.), Mt. Aberdeen, Mt. Temple, Mt. Vice President, Mt. Signal 18 (a Dominion Land Survey station), and Isolated Peak. For a month, he guided Lewis Livingston Delafield (1864–1944), a New York attorney, banker, social activist, and later president of the American Alpine Club. Delafield developed a close relationship with Kaufmann:

“My object has been less to climb than to see the mountains intensely, and Peter has seconded my efforts to do so upon very numerous expeditions from the Chalet [at Lake Louise] and from various camps all of which have involved ice work or rock work and some of which have required actual climbing. I warmly commend him as a capable guide and as an agreeable companion. He never shirks his work, and he has been most assiduous in looking after my safety and comfort.”

After two years in Canada, Kaufmann did not return. Nobs observed that the Swiss guides of the older generation (born between 1850 and 1860) had difficulty adapting to the life in Canada. They were unaccustomed to travel long distances in the wilderness by horse or canoe in order to establish base camps for climbs. In addition, the accommodations for guides were usually rustic camps or basic employee quarters in hotels. And most understandably, guides with families, such as Kaufmann, became home-sick after a four-to-five month absence from wife and children.

== Later career (1909-1920) ==
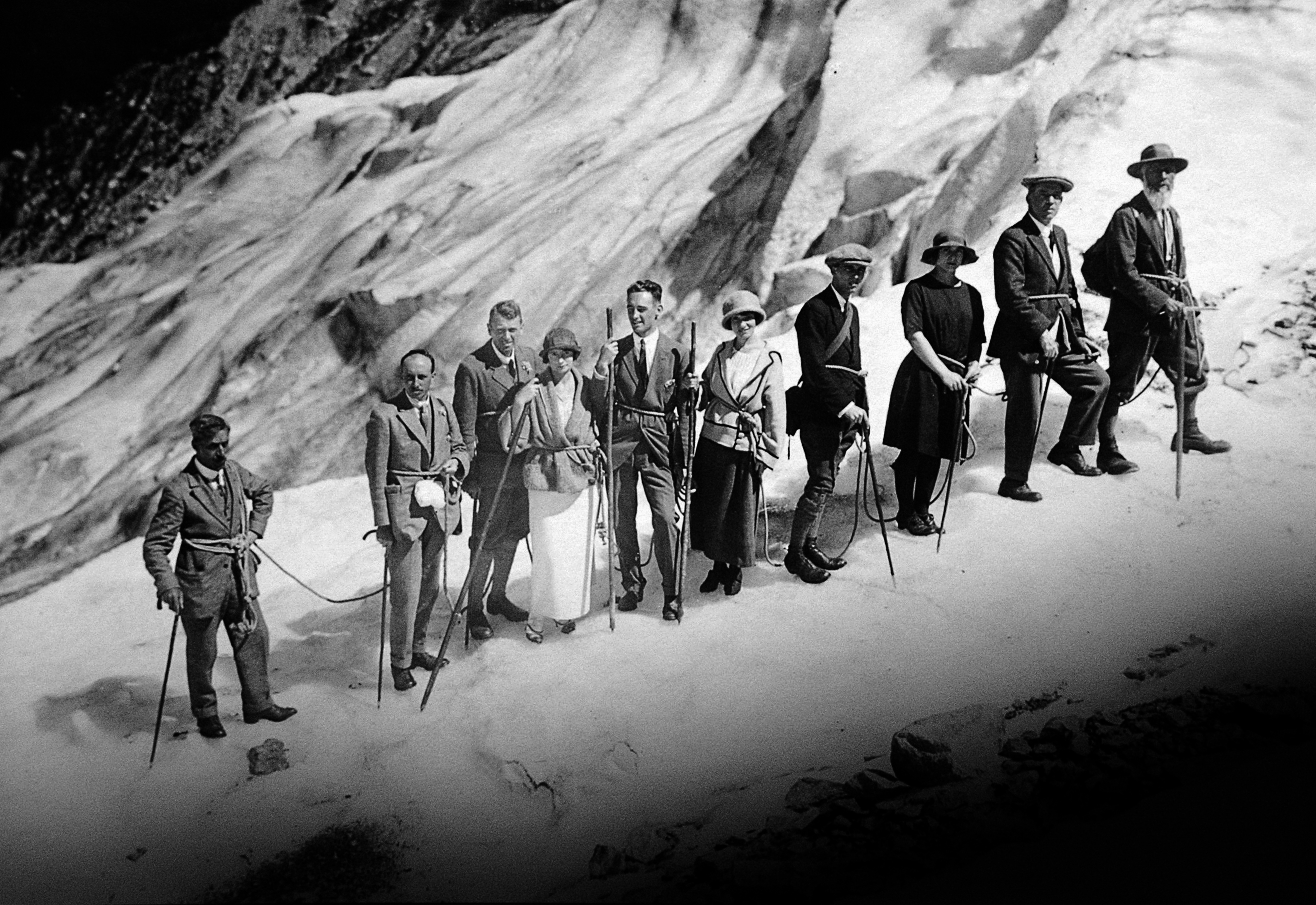
Peter Kaufmann (far right) leads a group of tourists across the upper Grindelwald glacier (ca. 1920)

After returning to Europe in October 1908 aboard the Empress of Britain, Kaufmann continued his career as a guide to the high peaks in the Bernese Oberland. In August 1909, for instance, he and his half-brother Rudolf guided W. S. Jackson from Toronto, Canada, to the summits of the Mönch and Fiescherhorn. Jackson, who was classics professor at Upper College, had written the climbing notes on the Rockies in Baedeker's Canada (1907). In 1909, 1911, and 1913, Adolf A. Friedländer, professor of psychiatry at the Hohe Mark Klinik in Frankfurt a/M, climbed a range of mountains (Wetterhorn, Mönch, Zäsenberg, Beithorn, Jungfrau, Schreckhorn, and Finsteraarhorn) with Kaufmann; the man, who had major disagreements with Sigmund Freud, developed great respect for Kaufmann, saying he admired his first-class fortitude, caution, resolve, and confidence as a guide, whether it was in good weather or fog, rain or snow. Oskar Eliel (1878–1939), an active supporter of Jewish rights during the rise of Nazism, and his wife climbed the Wetterhorn and the Jungfrau with Kaufmann in September 1919.

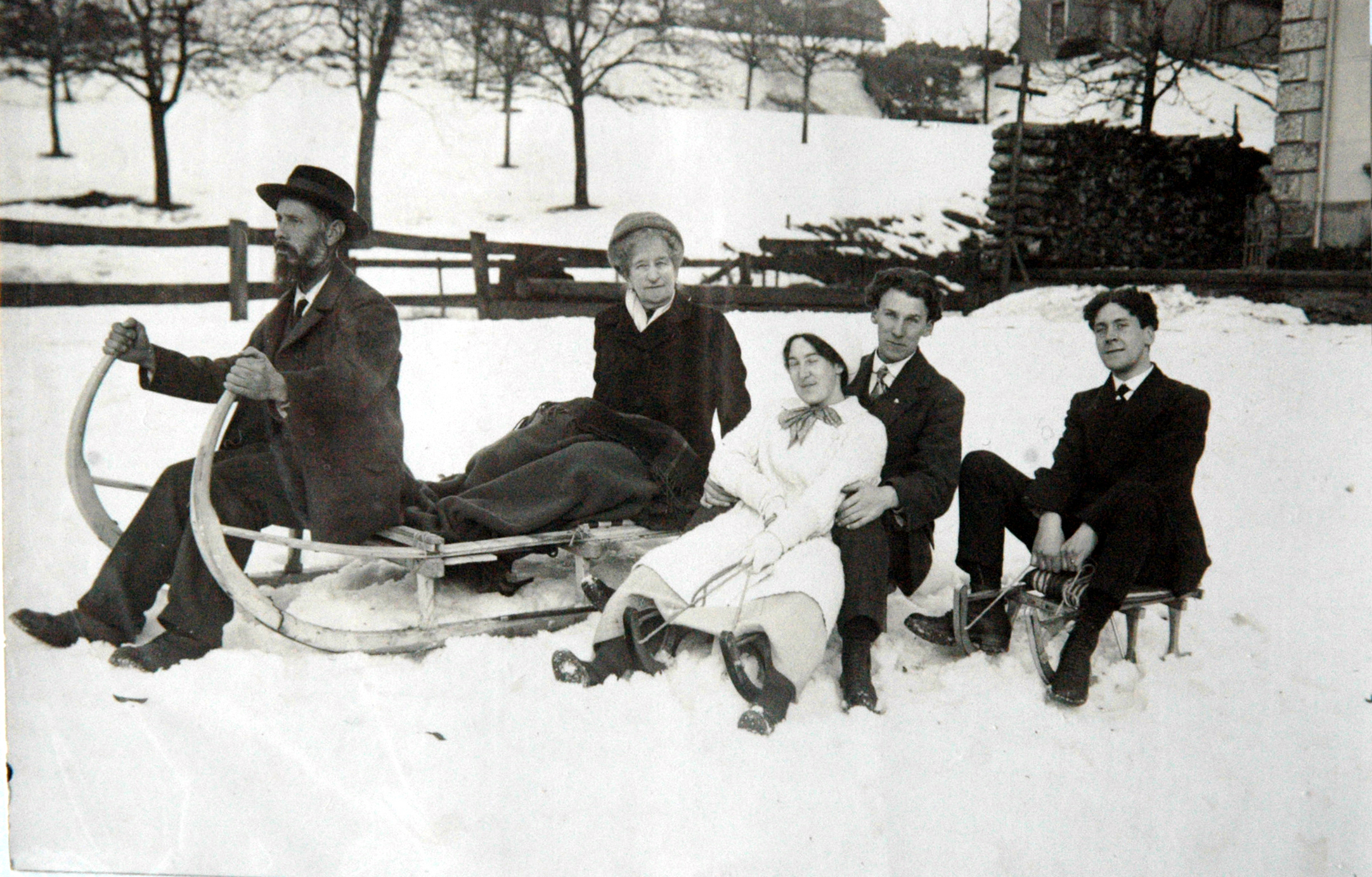
Peter Kaufmann on horn sled with hotel guests (ca. 1912)

Aside from guiding determined and experienced mountaineers to the summits of major Bernese mountains, Kaufmann also led amateurs and tourists on less demanding adventures. He frequently led groups of 7 to 10 individuals across the upper and lower Grindelwald glaciers. One contemporary observer wrote that “the climbing of the great glacier of Grindelwald . . . is an experience that every seeker after new sensations should try.” Gentlemen with suits and ties as well as ladies in full-length skirts, tied together by a mountain rope, climbed long rickety wooden ladders and crossed glacial fissures for that experience of a lifetime. The upper glacier also offered the chance to enter a grotto made of blue ice, a great wonder of the time. During the winter season, Kaufmann, using the local horn-sled (Hornschlitten), offered sleigh rides to hotel guests, especially the elderly and disabled. Excursions to the summit of the Faulhorn (8,796 ft.) with its panoramic view was a popular destination. Although reaching the hotel on the peak involved a strenuous but manageable four-and-a-half hour hike from Grindelwald, it was advisable to secure a guide such as Kaufmann because of the very steep slopes.

== Final years (1921-1924) ==
Four months before his death, Peter Kaufmann was guiding clients to the summits of the Wetterhorn and Jungfrau (ca. 1923).

During his life as a mountaineer, Peter Kaufmann was, first, an apprentice to his own father, then, a colleague to his brothers, and, finally, a teacher to his sons. Especially in the final years, he climbed with his own sons, Peter (1886–1971) and Fritz Kaufmann (1902–1978). At the age of 65, Kaufmann still received positive accolades from his clients. After a tour of the Aletsch region and a climb to the summit of the Jungfrau, J. Moret (from Wassenaar, Holland) writes that Kaufmann's “patriarchal figure guided us with youthful strength and mature caution. He was always of good cheer and ready to help, and his personality and positive outlook tremendously increased our pleasure of the tour."

On 14 October 1924, Peter Kaufmann suffered a heart attack and died in Grindelwald at the age of 66. Pastor Martin Nil of Grindelwald officiated at the funeral, and Kaufmann was buried in the churchyard cemetery on 21 October.
