= John Baume =

English rugby union player

- Full name: John Lea Baume
- Born: 18 July 1920 Dewsbury, Yorkshire, England
- Died: 15 September 2005 (aged 85) St Germans, Cornwall, England

Rugby union career
- Position: Prop
International career
Years	Team	Apps	(Points)
1950	England	1	(0)

John Lea Baume (18 July 1920 – 15 September 2005) was an English international rugby union player.

Baume, born in Dewsbury, was educated at Ashville College and served with the Royal Northumberland Fusiliers.

A front-row forward, Baume played his rugby for the Army, Northern, Headingley and Harrogate. He gained an England cap against Scotland at Murrayfield Stadium during the 1950 Five Nations Championship.

== See also ==
- List of England national rugby union players
