= Belmore Browne =

American artist and explorer (1880–1954)

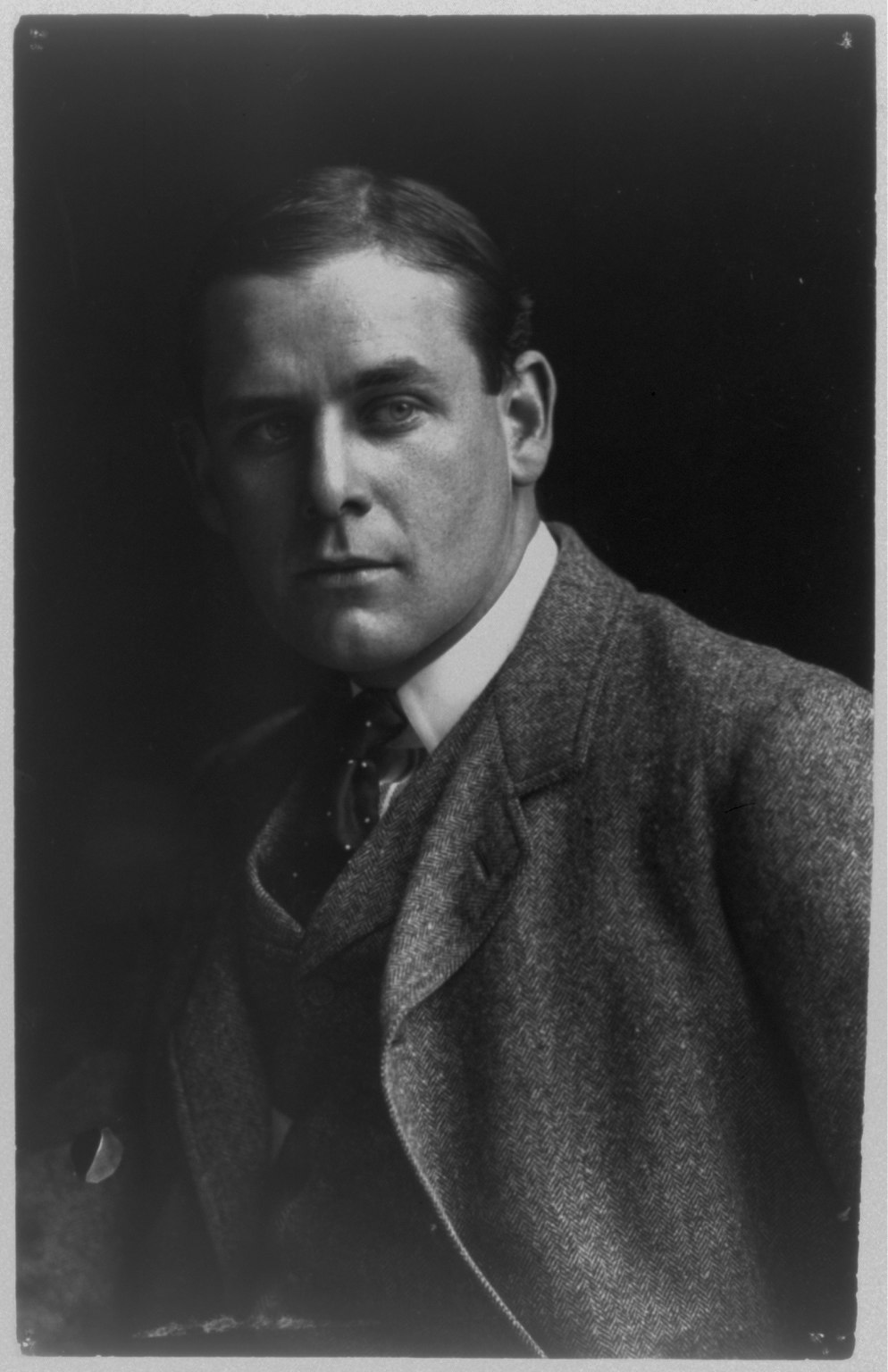
- Portrait of Browne
- Born: 1880; Tompkinsville, New York, U.S.
- Died: May 2, 1954 (aged 73–74); Rye, New York, U.S.
- Education: New York School of Art; Académie Julian
- Occupations: Painter; illustrator; explorer; writer; educator
- Spouse: Agnes E. Sibley (m. 1913)
- Children: 2

Belmore Browne (1880 – May 2, 1954) was an American artist and explorer. He was known for his painted dioramas in natural history museums.

== Early life ==
Belmore Browne was born in 1880 in Tompkinsville, New York, to Ella Haskell and George Browne Jr. His father was a lieutenant colonel in the American Civil War. The following year, the family went to Europe and he spent six summers in Switzerland or the Italian Lakes. At the age of eight, he traveled to Alaska with his family.

In 1889, the family settled in Tacoma, Washington, and his father worked in the lumber business. He, along with his two brothers, attended private schools in the eastern United States. Following admission into college, he worked briefly for his father's lumber business. He studied at the New York School of Art and Académie Julian.

== Career ==
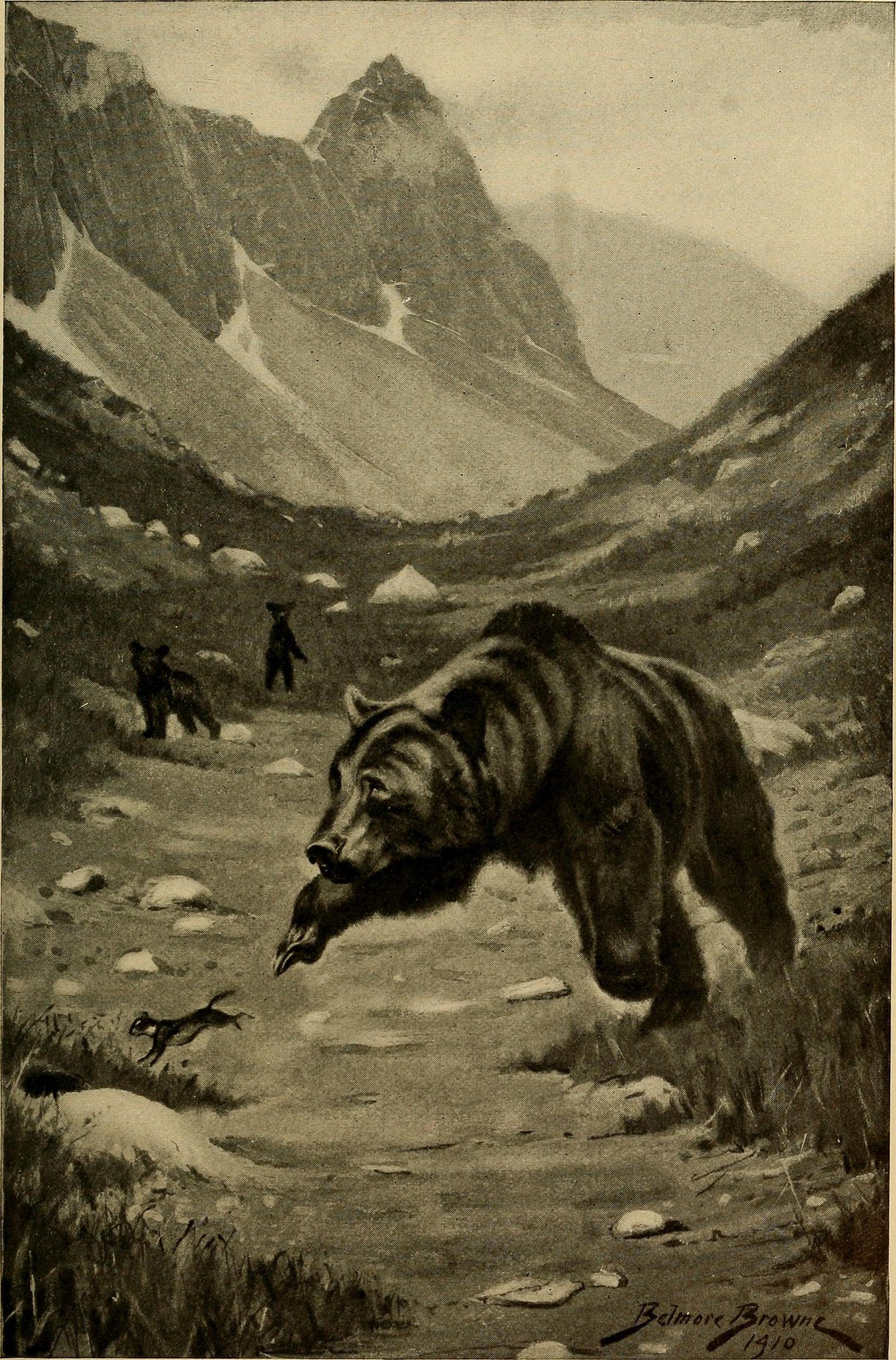
Illustration by Browne in The Outing Magazine (1917)

From 1901 to 1912, Browne was an illustrator for magazines. He worked briefly for a ranch east of the Cascades.

From 1901 to 1902, he returned to Alaska and the Cassiar Country as a member of Andrew Jackson Stone's expeditions to collect large mammals for the American Museum of Natural History. During these expeditions, he worked as an artist and hunter. He practiced drafting anatomical-correct drawings of animals.

In 1908, he was co-leader of the first group to ascend Mount Olympus in Washington. In 1906, 1910 and 1912, he was co-leader of the Parker-Browne Mount McKinley expedition with Herschel Clifford Parker to explore unmapped glacial regions in Alaska. He attempted to ascend Denali (then Mount McKinley) three times.

From 1897 to 1898, Browne was a member of the Washington National Guard. He served as a captain in World War I in the aviation section of the Signal Corps.

Following the war, he moved to Alberta. According to his wife, this period was the most productive of his life. He would paint outdoors, even in the winter. His work was exhibited in a number of art museums throughout his lifetime, including the National Academy of Design, Pennsylvania Academy of the Fine Arts, National Gallery of Art, the Corcoran Gallery of Art and the California Academy of Sciences in San Francisco.

He painted dioramas for natural history museums later in his life. He and his son painted five wild animal groups, the kodiak bear, mountain goat, elk, caribou and mountain sheep, for the North American Hall of the American Museum of Natural History. He also painted a diorama for the California Academy of Sciences. Just before his death, he had completed a black bear group for the Boston Museum of Science. He died before starting a diorama of the Alaskan brown bear group for the Peabody Museum of Natural History.

Browne would start spending his winters in California and was named director of Santa Barbara School of the Arts in 1930. During World War II, he was a consultant on Arctic survival to the American and British Air Forces. He taught these courses in Colorado. Following the war, he continued to teach in McCall, Idaho.

Browne wrote Conquest of Mt. McKinley and several adventure books for boys. He was active in the Boy Scouts of America and was a member of its National Council. He wrote the first Boy Scout handbook. He was an honorary member of the Camp Fire Club and was a member of Marin County's Boy Scout executive board for fifteen years.

== Personal life ==
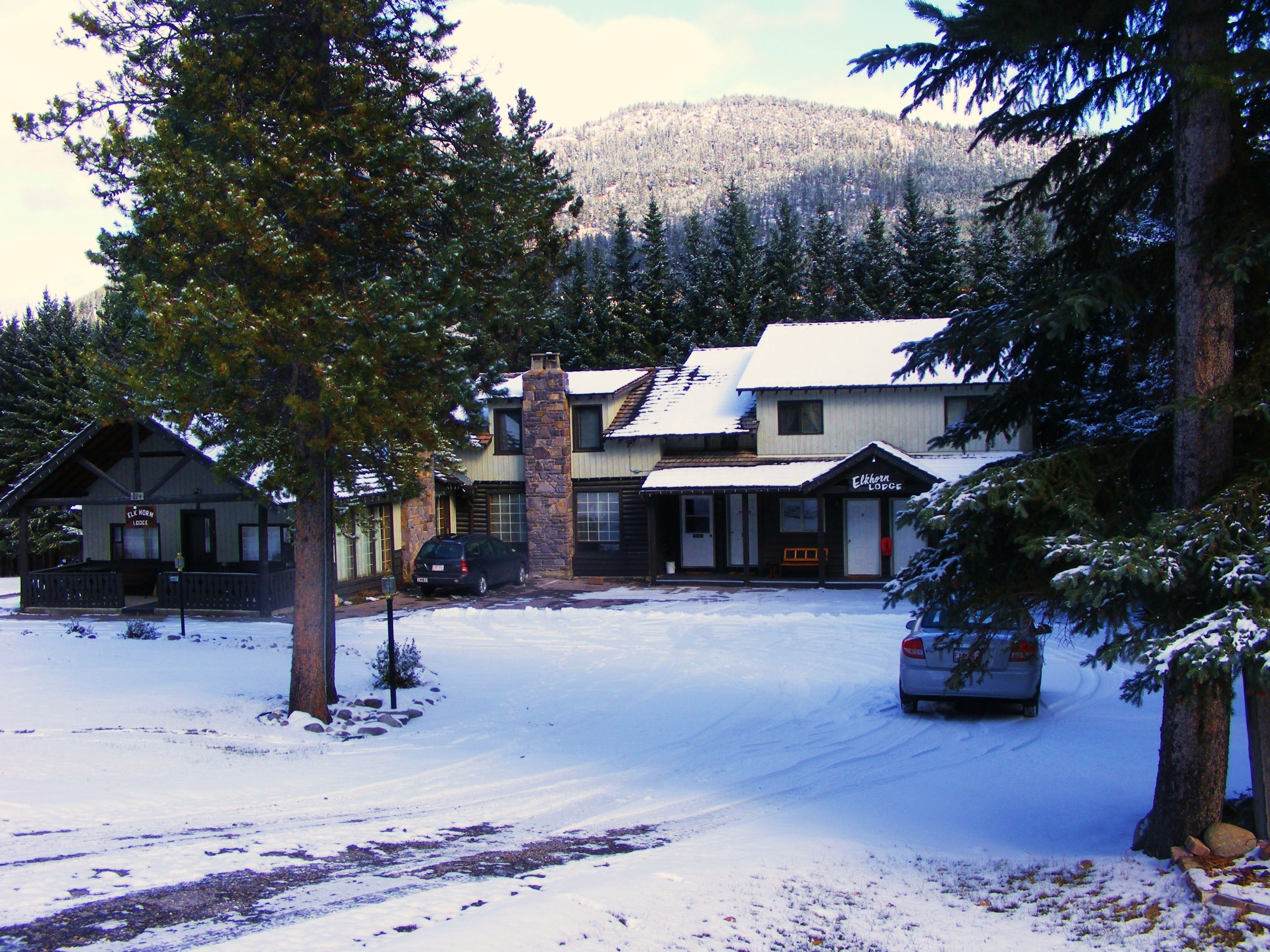
Browne's home in Banff, Alberta

Browne married Agnes E. Sibley of Philadelphia in 1913. They had a son and daughter, George and Evelyn. They had a home in Banff, Alberta. They moved to a summer house in Seebe, Alberta, in 1947. They had a winter house on Laguintas Road in Ross, California. They attended St. John's Episcopal Church in Ross.

Browne died on May 2, 1954, at the home of his cousin in Rye, New York.
