= Deltaform Mountain =

Mountain in Canada

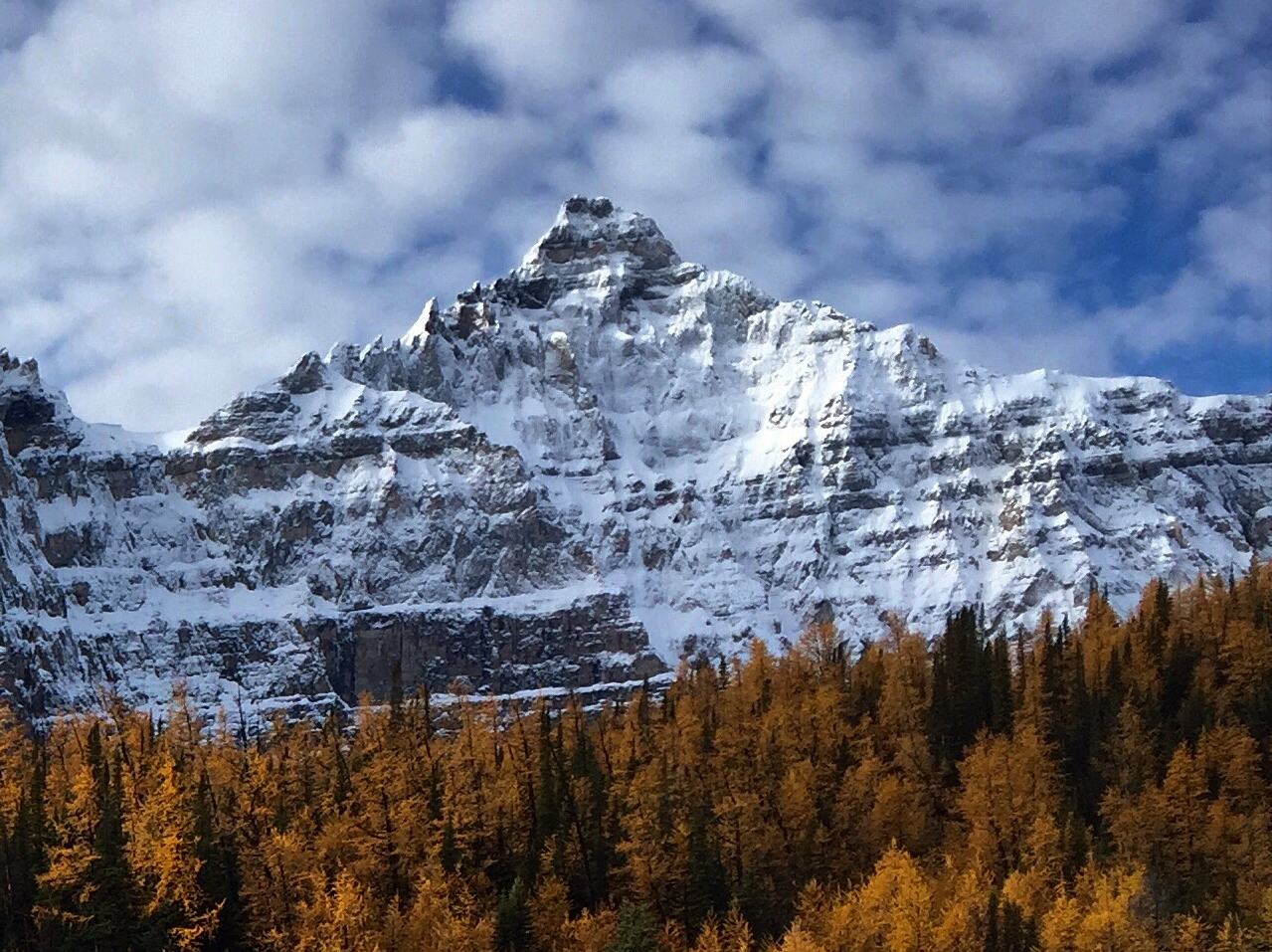
- Deltaform Mountain

Highest point
- Elevation: 3,424 m (11,234 ft)
- Prominence: 822 m (2,697 ft)
- Parent peak: Hungabee Mountain (3492 m)
- Listing: Mountains of Alberta; Mountains of British Columbia
- Coordinates: 51°18′06″N 116°14′43″W

Geography
- Location within Alberta Location within British Columbia Location within Canada
- Interactive map of Deltaform Mountain
- Country: Canada
- Provinces: Alberta; British Columbia
- Protected area: Banff National Park; Kootenay National Park
- Parent range: Bow Range
- Topo map: NTS 82N8 Lake Louise

Climbing
- First ascent: 1 September 1903 by A. Eggers, H.C. Parker, C. Kaufmann, and H. Kaufmann
- Easiest route: rock/snow climb

Deltaform Mountain is one of the mountains in the Valley of the Ten Peaks, located on the Continental Divide on the border of British Columbia and Alberta, and also on the border between Banff and Kootenay National Parks in Canada. The mountain was originally named Saknowa by Samuel Allen but Walter Wilcox named it to its official title in 1897 as it resembles the Greek letter delta.

Deltaform was first climbed in 1903 by August Eggers and Herschel Clifford Parker who were guided by Christian and Hans Kaufmann.

== Climbing routes ==
The two main climbing routes are:

- North-West Ridge (Normal Route) II 5.5
- North Face, The Supercouloir IV 5.8

== Geology ==
Deltaform Mountain is composed of sedimentary rock laid down during the Precambrian to Jurassic periods. Formed in shallow seas, this sedimentary rock was pushed east and over the top of younger rock during the Laramide orogeny.

== Climate ==
Based on the Köppen climate classification, Deltaform is located in a subarctic climate with cold, snowy winters, and mild summers. Temperatures can drop below −20 °C (−4 °F) with wind chill factors below −30 °C (−22 °F).

== Gallery ==
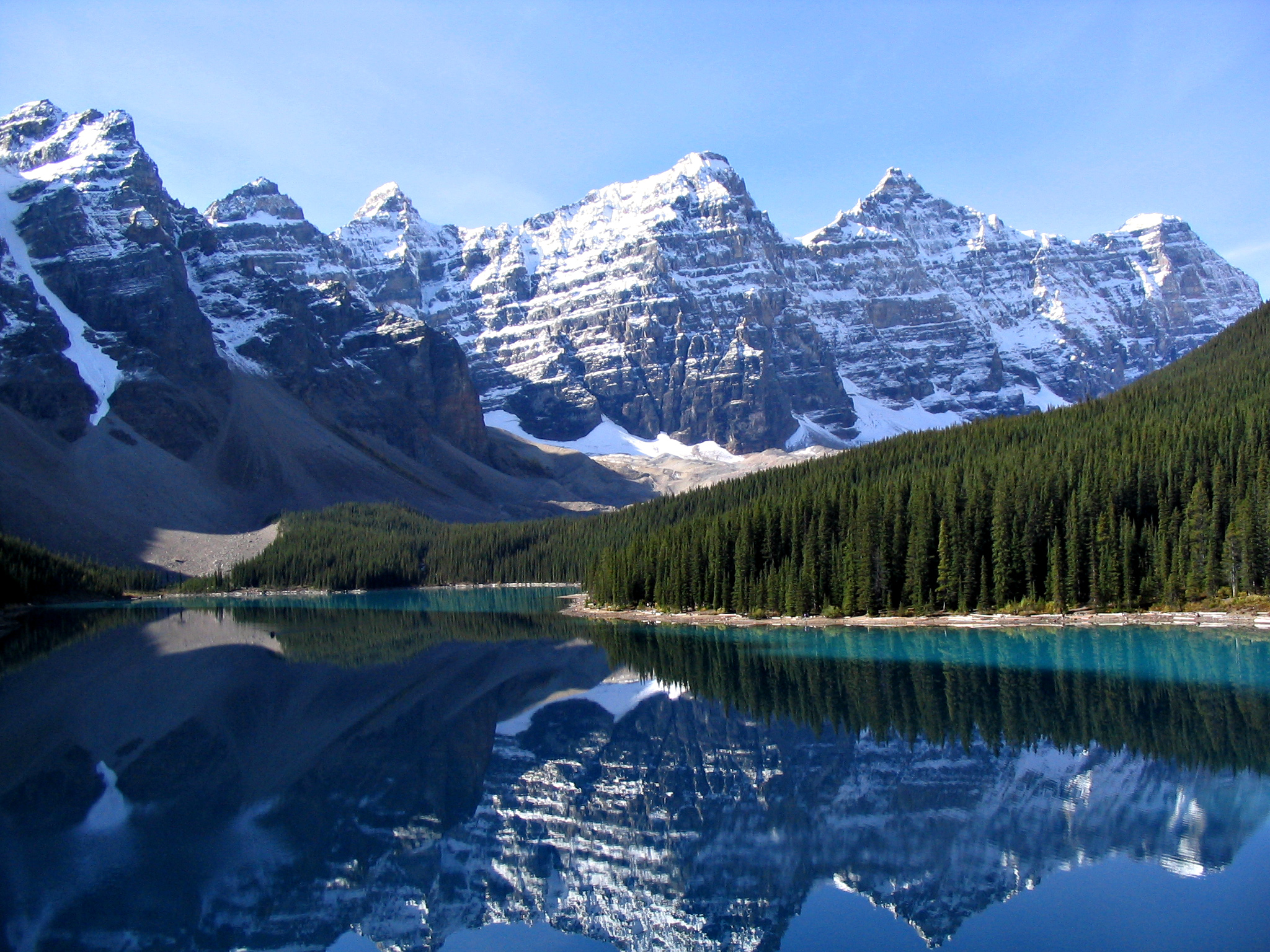
Valley of the Ten Peaks and Moraine Lake, Banff National Park, Canada. Mountains from left to right: Tonsa (3057 m),
Mount Perren (3051 m), Mount Allen (3310 m), Mount Tuzo (3246 m), Deltaform Mountain (3424 m), Neptuak Mountain (3233 m)

== See also ==
- List of peaks on the Alberta–British Columbia border
