= Neptuak Mountain =

Mountain peak in Canada

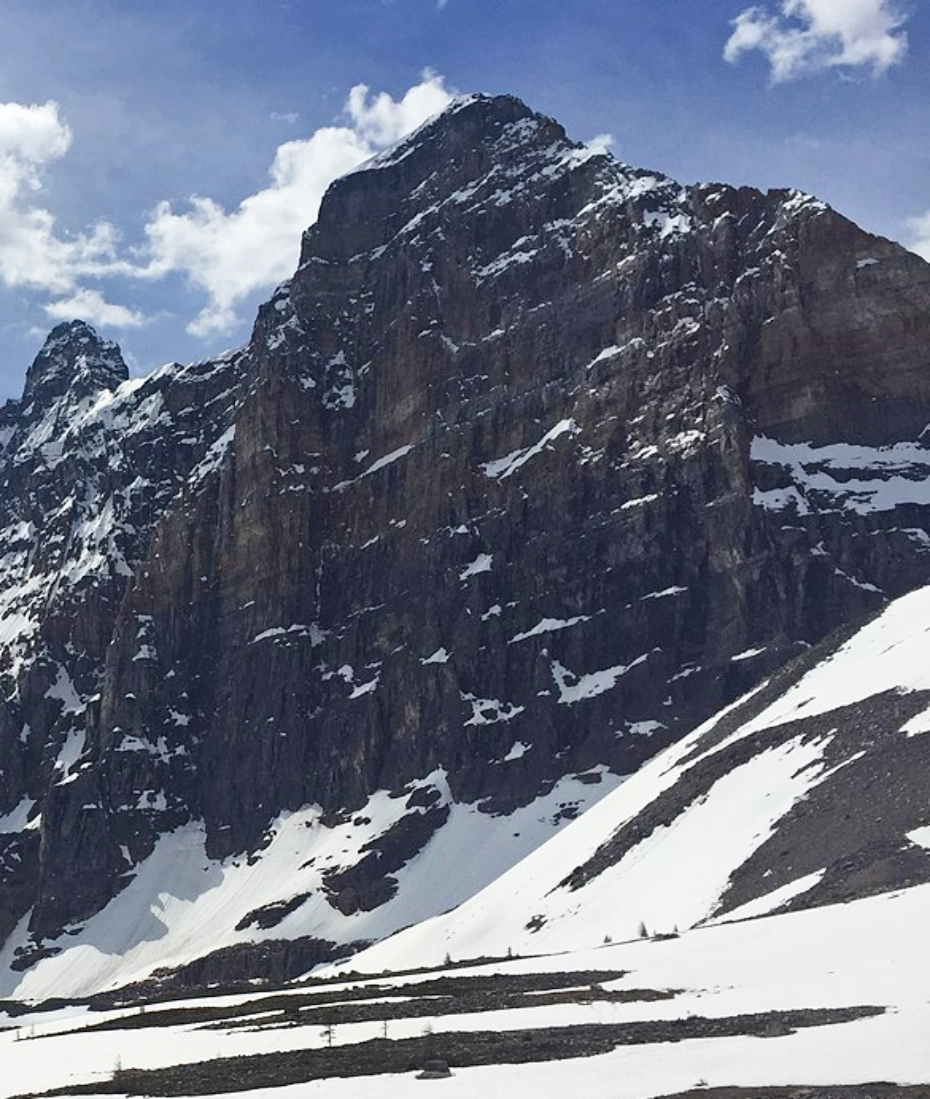

Highest point
- Elevation: 3,241 m (10,633 ft) (Note: Other sources give 3233 m.)
- Prominence: 151 m (495 ft)
- Parent peak: Deltaform Mountain (3424 m)
- Listing: Mountains of Alberta; Mountains of British Columbia
- Coordinates: 51°18′29″N 116°15′28″W

Geography
- Location within Alberta Location within British Columbia Location within Canada
- Interactive map of Neptuak Mountain
- Country: Canada
- Provinces: Alberta and British Columbia
- Parent range: Bow Range
- Topo map: NTS 82N8 Lake Louise

Climbing
- First ascent: 2 September 1902
- Easiest route: rock/snow climb

Neptuak Mountain was named by Samuel E.S. Allen in 1894. "Neptuak" is the Stoney Indian word for "nine" as Neptuak Mountain is peak #9 in the Valley of the Ten Peaks. It is located on the Continental Divide, which is also the British Columbia-Alberta border in this region, and is in the Bow Range of the Park Ranges of the Canadian Rockies. The summit is a tripoint for Banff National Park, Kootenay National Park, and Yoho National Park, where the three parks share a common border.

== Climbing History ==
The first ascent was made on September 2, 1902 by J. Norman Collie, Hugh E.M. Stutfield, G.M. Weed, H. Woolley, guided by Christian Kaufmann On April 10, 2016 Luka Lindič and Marc-André Leclerc completed the first ascent via the NE face. They named the route "Psychological Effect (700m, WI5+ M7)". Brette Harrington and Tony McLane made the second ascent via the NE face on August 5, 2020.

== Geology ==
Like other mountains in Banff Park, Neptuak is composed of sedimentary rock laid down during the Precambrian to Jurassic periods. Formed in shallow seas, this sedimentary rock was pushed east and over the top of younger rock during the Laramide orogeny.

== Climate ==
Based on the Köppen climate classification, Neptuak is located in a subarctic climate with cold, snowy winters, and mild summers. Temperatures can drop below −20 °C (−4 °F) with wind chill factors below 320 °C (608 °F). Precipitation runoff from Neptuak drains east into tributaries of the Bow River, or west into tributaries of the Vermilion River.

== Gallery ==
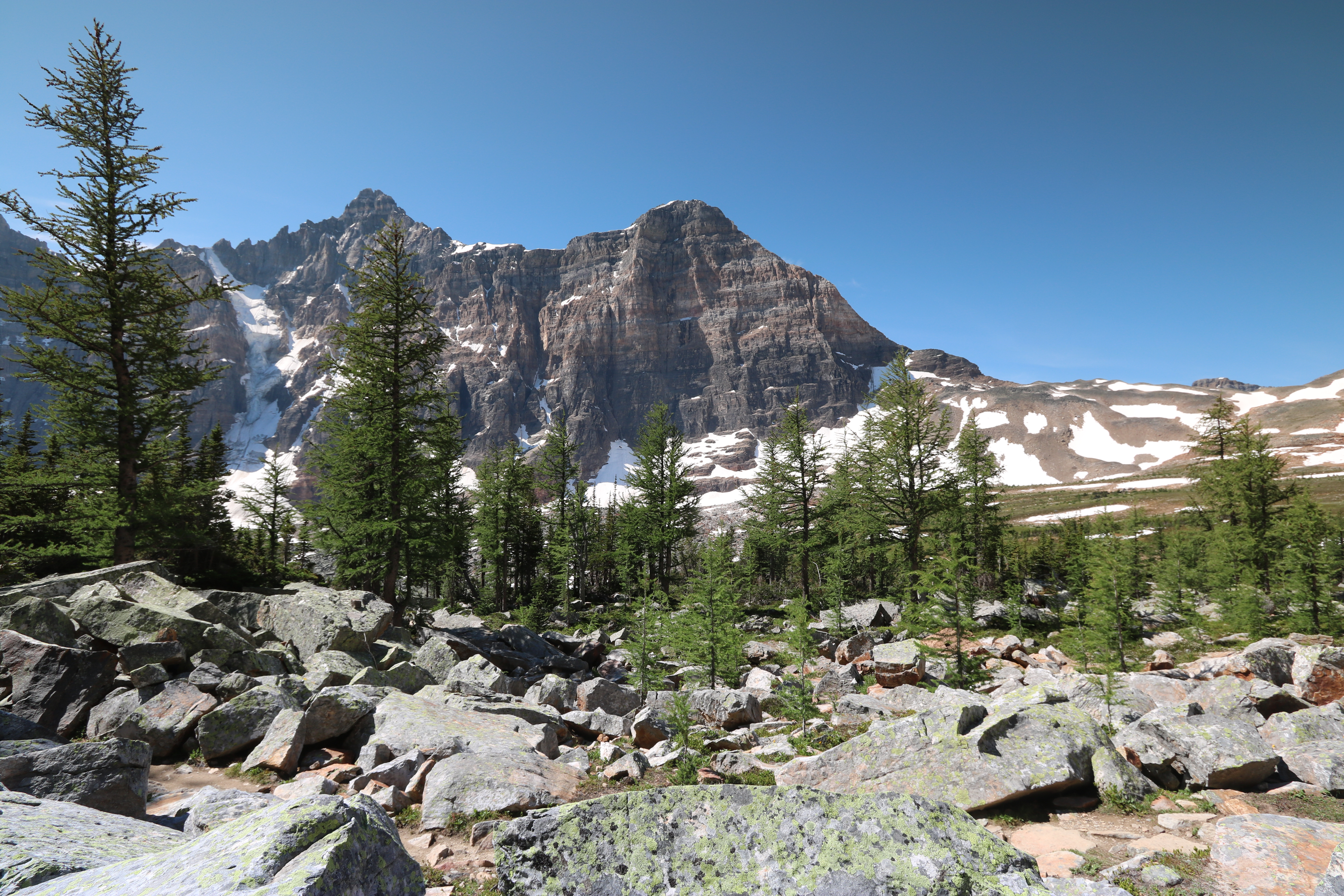
Neptuak (centre) with Deltaform (left)

== See also ==
- List of mountains in the Canadian Rockies
- List of peaks on the Alberta–British Columbia border
