= Herschel Clifford Parker =

American physicist and mountaineer

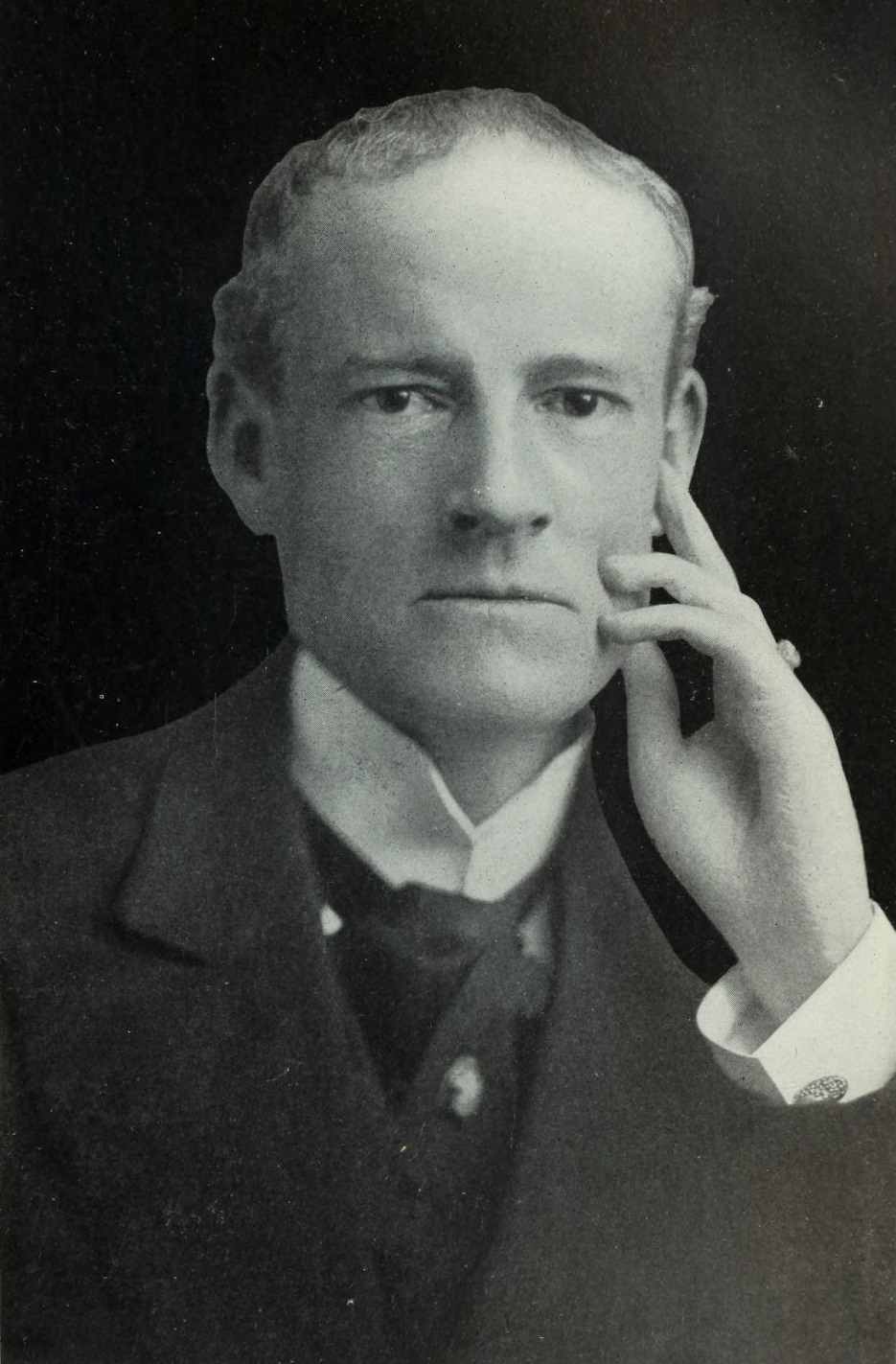
- Born: 9 July 1867; Brooklyn, New York
- Died: 12 March 1944
- Occupation(s): Physicist, mountaineer

Herschel Clifford Parker (9 July 1867 – 12 March 1944) was an American physicist and mountaineer. He was one of the original members of the American Alpine Club.

== Biography ==
Parker was born at Brooklyn, New York. He graduated from the Columbia School of Mines in 1890, receiving a degree of Ph.B., and was connected with the faculty there in 1891–1911, filling the chair of physics for some time before his resignation. He wrote Systematic Treatise on Electrical Measurements (1897), and made many contributions to scientific periodicals. He was a member of the American Institute of Electrical Engineers, the American Physical Society, the New York Academy of Sciences, The Explorers Club, and the Appalachian Mountain Club. He was a fellow of the American Association for the Advancement of Science and president of the Vedanta Society of New York.

Parker was a vegetarian.

=== Mountaineering ===
Prospecting, surveying, and studying mineralogy and general physics, he made explorations and first ascents in the Canadian Alps in 1897, 1899 and 1903. He participated in first ascents of the mountains Goodsir and Dawson in British Columbia, and of Hungabee, Deltaform, Biddle and Lefroy in Alberta. He made explorations of the Denali (Mount McKinley) region in Alaska in 1906, 1910 and 1912. He nearly succeeded in reaching the summit of the highest peak of Denali in 1912. In his 1912 attempt on Denali, he was accompanied by Belmore Browne. On an earlier attempt, he was accompanied by Frederick Cook.

== Legacy ==
- Parker Pass in Denali National Park is named after him.
