= New College, Harrogate =

New College

Location
- Leadhall Lane; Harrogate, North Yorkshire; England; 53.97295264°N 1.53757235079°W

Information
- Type: Independent school
- Motto: Esse quam videri "To be, rather than to seem to be" (post 1930)
- Religious affiliation: Methodist after 1930
- Established: 1898 as New College
- Founder: Rev Haslam DD
- Closed: 1971
- Headmaster Housemaster: Mr Haslam (1898-1917); Mr Spensley (1961-1963)
- Staff: 10 (1961-1963)
- Age: 11 to 13
- Enrolment: 100
- Former pupils: Old Ashvillians
- Website: http://www.ashville.co.uk

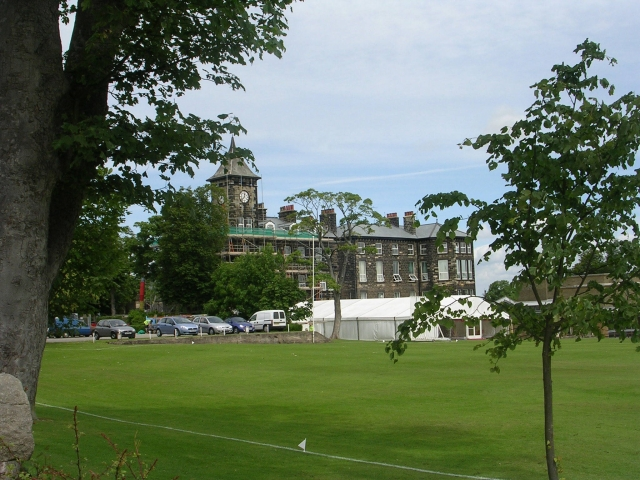
Ashville College, Harrogate

New College, Harrogate was an independent preparatory school in Harrogate, Yorkshire which amalgamated with Ashville College in 1930.

New College was founded as Turton Hall School in 1850 and transferred from Gildersome to Harrogate in 1898. Rev John Haslam DD was Proprietor/Headmaster of Turton Hall School from 1873 and when the lease ran out in 1898 he purchased land and built New College in Harrogate for £10,000. He became the Principal of New College (and his painting dominated the dining hall) and his son W. J. Haslam became headmaster.

New College was located 20 minutes' walk from Harrogate railway station, in one of the healthiest part of town. It was situated on the brow of a hill, sloping southward, about 450 feet above sea level, and commanding extensive views of the district.

In 1900 the New College estate comprised 34 acres and included a vegetable garden, a farm, two Fives Courts (35 x 28), a Gymnasium (60 x 16), a Workshop, 2 Tennis Courts, a Cinder Court and a bicycle track.

The Boys' Department comprised a large Dining Hall and Assembly Room (50 x 22), with a raised platform for Choir and Organ for Divine Service, Three Class Rooms, a School Parlour, a Library, a Music Room, a Laboratory, a Bath and Dressing Room, Lavatory, Boot and Two Cloak Rooms.

The Senior Dormitory was fitted with dressing cubicles as recommended by Dr. Clement Dukes in his work on Health at School, and adopted at The Leys School, Cambridge. There was an Intermediate Dormitory and two smaller dormitories for younger boys.

All the rooms were heated with hot water pipes, and ventilated on the most approved principles. Special attention was given to the sanitary arrangements.

Rev Haslam continued to be Principal until his death in 1917 when he was buried at Harlow Hill Cemetery.

After the First World War New College experienced a short-term boom, and from 1919 to 1923 more than a hundred boys were in residence. A Common Room and Library were added in 1920 and a Gymnasium in 1926. Typically trips were arranged abroad (for masters and boys) to climb the Matterhorn or to fly to Paris, on a Handley Page aircraft, from Croydon airport.

At the end of the summer term 1927 W. J. Haslam retired and was succeeded by R. H. F. Coleman. Numbers were already falling due to the Great Depression and the end came quickly. As Ashville College was considering a new school for juniors an arrangement for the union of Ashville and New College in April 1930.

The school could accommodate 80 boys and stood in a wooded estate of 27 acres and included a gym, extensive playing fields, a quad and a "Jungle".

The acquisition of New College by Ashville College proved to be of value. Boys received a first-class education until their thirteenth year when they were transferred to Ashville College. As the two schools were closely associated there was no danger of a violent break. Placing Prep and Senior Schools under one control was increasingly recognised, at this time, by Public Schools.

The School was demolished in 1971 and although Yorkshire Television had considered purchasing it, the site was sold to a property developer.
