= Ashville College =

Independent school in North Yorkshire, England

Location
- Green Lane; Harrogate, North Yorkshire, HG2 9JP; England; 53.97386°N 1.55214°W

Information
- Type: Private school
- Motto: Esse quam videri ("To be, rather than to seem")
- Religious affiliation: Methodist
- Established: 1877
- Department for Education URN: 121758 Tables
- Chairman: G Styles
- Head: Rhiannon Wilkinson
- Age: 2 to 18
- Enrolment: 790
- Former pupils: Old Ashvillians
- Website: http://www.ashville.co.uk

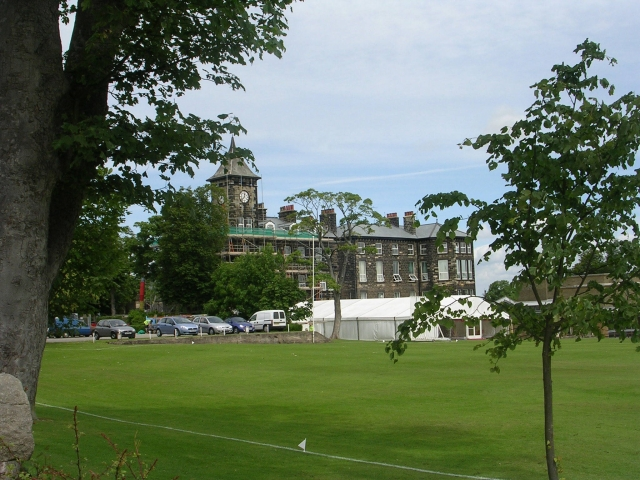
Ashville College

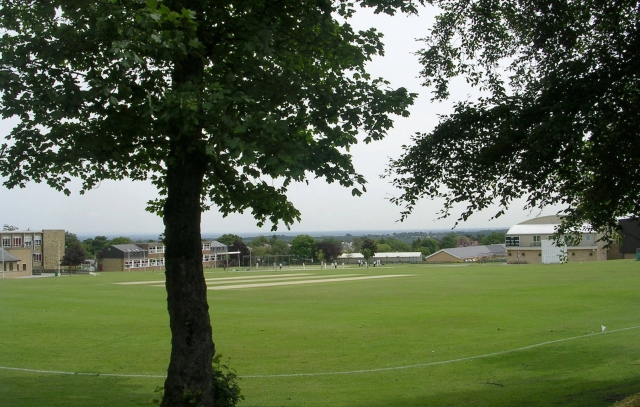
Cricket pitches at Ashville College

Ashville College is a co-educational private school for pupils aged 2–18 in Harrogate, North Yorkshire, England.

It was founded in 1877 as a boarding school for boys by the United Methodist Free Churches. It incorporated Elmfield College, Heworth, York and New College, Harrogate in the 1930s. The school maintains a Methodist ethos but is open to non-Methodists and to those of non-Christian religions. The college accepted girls in 1982 and is fully co-educational. It thrives as the oldest independent school in Harrogate and owns an estate of 60 acres (24 ha) on the south side of the spa town.

== History ==
In 1875 the United Methodist Free Churches Assembly agreed to establish a college that promoted a sound and advanced education. A set of six committee members were appointed to search for suitable premises and thereafter became the founding fathers of the school: Alderman R. Ellis, Rev. E. Boaden, Rev. R. Chew, Rev. J. Garside, W. H. C. Hardy and Rev. K. Kirksop. Ald. Ellis found a small private school and estate called Ashville on the outskirts of Harrogate and purchased it for £5,800. Dr William Richardson was appointed as headmaster and the school opened on 17 July 1877 with 30 pupils and two masters, with school fees being £25 per annum.

In 1889 the school underwent a period of expansion which began with the opening of the East Wing in order to house more boys. By 1902 the school site included a cricket pavilion, tennis courts and a gymnasium. The school's clock tower was built in 1911.

In World War I, 300 of the school's pupils were called up and 38 died in the conflict, including 8 who died in the Battle of the Somme. In 1921 a cenotaph was built, funded by the Old Boys' Association.

In the 1920s and 1930s the school underwent further expansion to include the Memorial Hall, Library, Music Rooms and an open-air swimming pool.

In 1929 Ashville purchased New College, Harrogate for £40,000 which included 27 acres (11 ha) of land. In 1932 the school merged with Elmfield College bringing its student population to 280 boys and making Ashville the largest private school in the north of England.

At the outbreak of World War II, Ashville was requisitioned to the Royal Air Force and the school was evacuated to The Hydro Hotel in Bowness-on-Windermere. During the war 465 of the school's pupils volunteered for the forces, 59 were killed and 90 decorations were awarded to Old Ashvillians. The school did not return to its original site in Harrogate until 1946.

In 1982 girls were admitted to the school for the first time, initially only as day pupils until 1989 when the girls' boarding house was opened.

In December 2018 Ashville College was accredited by the New England Association of Schools and Colleges (NEASC). Few schools in the United Kingdom hold this status.

== Boarding ==
Ashville College offers boarding for pupils in Years 5 (aged 9) and above. Pupils live in two boarding houses:

- Briggs-Mallinson House (senior boys),
- Norfolk House (senior girls)

It was revealed in February 2024 that the school planned to wind down its boarding provision in the next 12 to 18 months. Boarding will therefore cease in July 2025, and the school will be exclusively for day pupils from September 2025 onwards.

Boarding houses are managed by housemasters or housemistresses who are assisted by a team of residential tutors and matrons.

== Current head ==
Mrs Rhiannon Wilkinson, former Head of Harrogate Ladies College and Wycombe Abbey, took over from Elspeth Fisher as Head in September 2021. Elspeth Fisher had been the Deputy Headteacher (with specific responsibility for pastoral care) since September 2005. Ian Kendrick held the specific responsibility for the academic side of the school at the time.

== Headteachers ==
- Dr William Richardson BA LLD (1877–1889)
- Dr John Bowick BA LLD (1890–1905)
- Rev. Alfred Soothill (1905–1926)
- Joseph T. Lancaster MA MLitt (1927–1957)
- G. Ronald Southam (1957–1977)
- David Norfolk MA (Oxon) (1977–1987)
- Michael Crosby (1987–2003)
- Andrew Fleck (2003–2010)
- Mark Lauder (2010–2017)
- Richard Marshall (2017–2020, died 2020)
- Elspeth Fisher (the 2020–2021 academic year only, owing to Richard Marshall's deteriorating health)
- Rhiannon Wilkinson (2021–)

== Notable Old Ashvillians ==
- Arthur Balfour, 1st Baron Riverdale (1873–1957), industrialist
- Jim Carter (born 1948), actor, Mr Carson in Downton Abbey
- Iain Coucher (born 1962), former CEO, Network Rail
- Jamie Donoughue, Academy Award nominated film director, producer and writer
- Sir Stephen Furness, 1st Baronet (1872–1914), shipping magnate and Liberal MP
- Andy Gray (born 1977), footballer
- John Grieve (born 1946), police officer and university professor
- Henry Iles (1871–1951), entertainment entrepreneur
- Harold McIlvenny (1922–2009), footballer
- Tony Richardson (1928–1991), Academy Award winning film and theatre director
- Granville Sharp (1906–1997), Labour MP
- Jay Smith, pub landlord, television personality
- Colonel Sir Malcolm Stoddart-Scott (1901–1973), Conservative MP
- Julian Sturdy (born 1971), Conservative MP
- Ian Swales (born 1953), Liberal Democrat MP
- Eugen Weber (1925–2007), historian
- Peter Whitehead (1937–2019), writer and filmmaker

== Bibliography ==
- Booth, William (1990) A History of Ashville and The Ashvillian Society. Harrogate: The Ashvillian Society, to mark their centenary (1890–1990).
