= Mount Hungabee =

Mountain in Alberta and British Columbia, Canada

- Hungabee Mountain
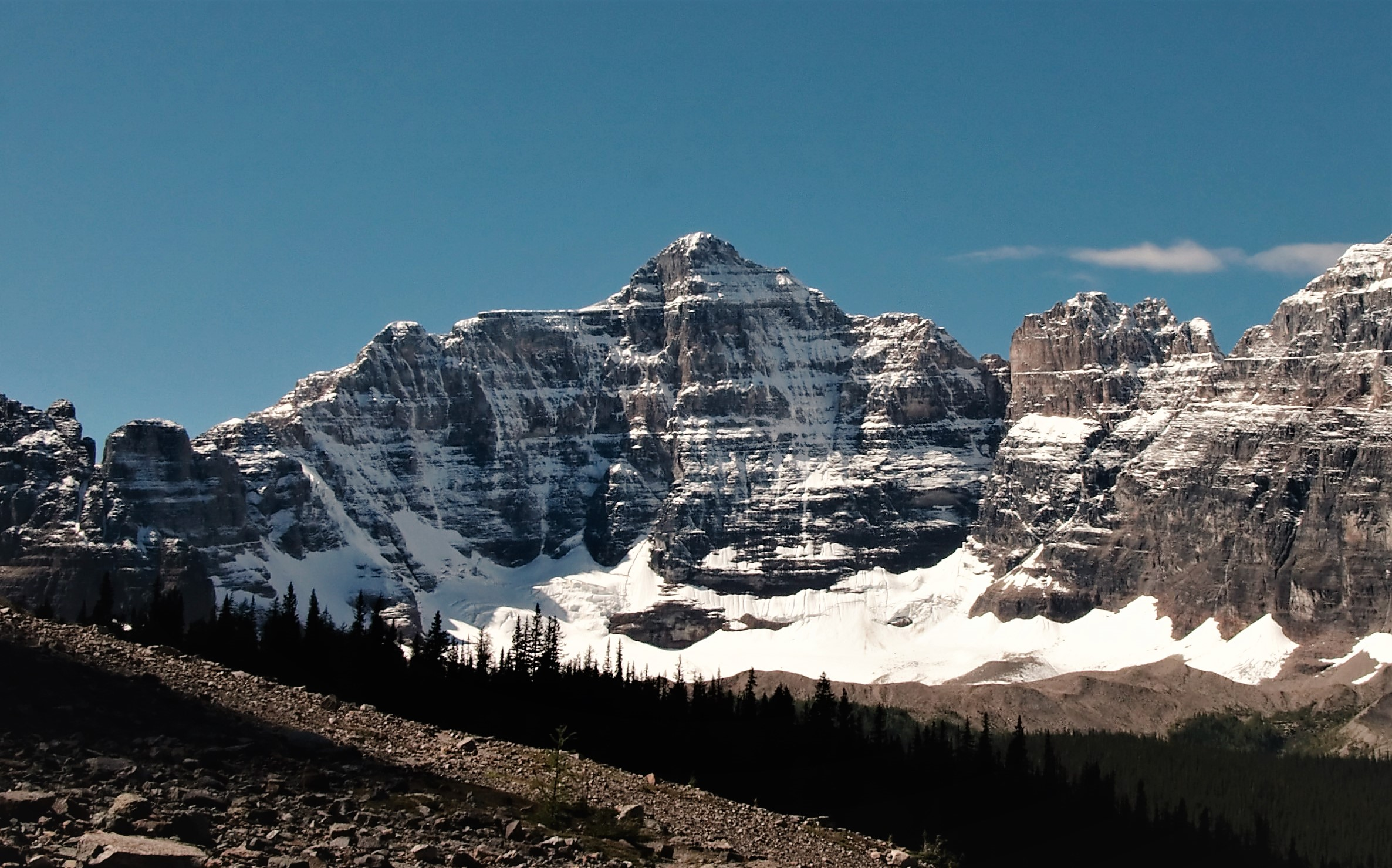
- Northeast aspect

Highest point
- Elevation: 3,492 m (11,457 ft)
- Prominence: 987 m (3,238 ft)
- Listing: Mountains of Alberta; Mountains of British Columbia
- Coordinates: 51°19′58″N 116°17′02″W

Geography
- Location within Alberta Location within British Columbia Location within Canada
- Interactive map of Mount Hungabee
- Country: Canada
- Provinces: Alberta; British Columbia
- Protected area: Banff National Park; Yoho National Park
- Parent range: Bow Range
- Topo map: NTS 82N8 Lake Louise

Climbing
- First ascent: 21 July 1903
- Easiest route: rock/snow climb

Mount Hungabee, officially Hungabee Mountain, is on the boundaries of Banff National Park and Yoho National Park on the Continental Divide at the head of Paradise Valley, in Canada. The mountain was named in 1894 by Samuel Allen after the Stoney language (also known as Nakoda) word for "chieftain", as the mountain is higher than its neighbouring peaks. The mountain can be seen from the Icefields Parkway (Highway 93) in the upper Bow Valley.

== Climbing ==
Mount Hungabee was first climbed in 1903 by H.C. Parker, who was guided by Hans Kaufmann and Christian Kaufmann.

The normal climbing route is via the west ridge (III 5.4), which features route-finding challenges. Early summer is not recommended due to avalanche hazard from snow on the northwest face.

== Geology ==
Mount Hungabee is composed of sedimentary rock laid down during the Precambrian to Jurassic periods. Formed in shallow seas, this sedimentary rock was pushed east and over the top of younger rock during the Laramide orogeny.

== Climate ==
Based on the Köppen climate classification, Mount Hungabee is located in a subarctic climate zone with cold, snowy winters, and mild summers. Winter temperatures can drop below −20 °C with wind chill factors below −30 °C.

== Gallery ==
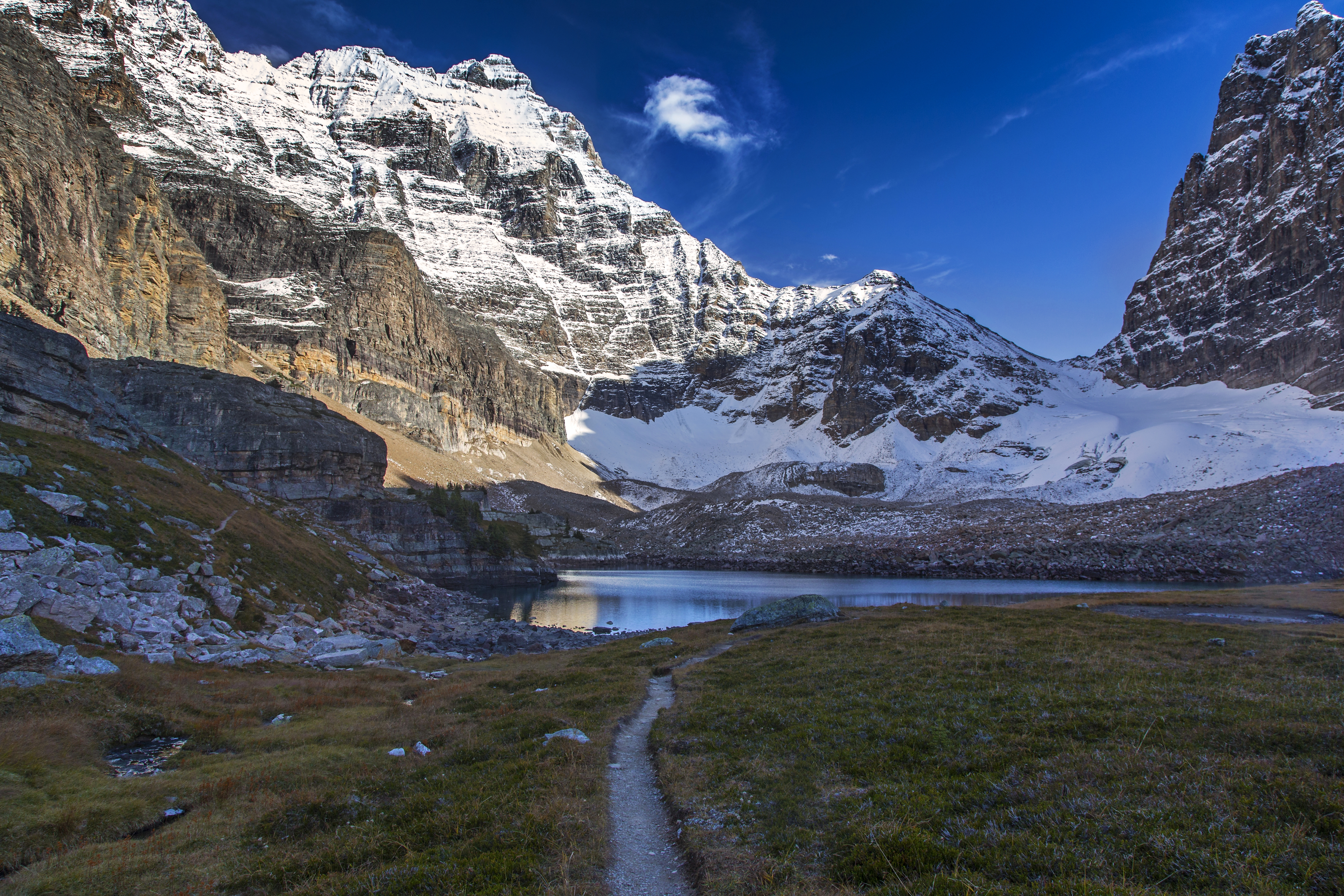
Mount Hungabee (left) and Opabin Pass

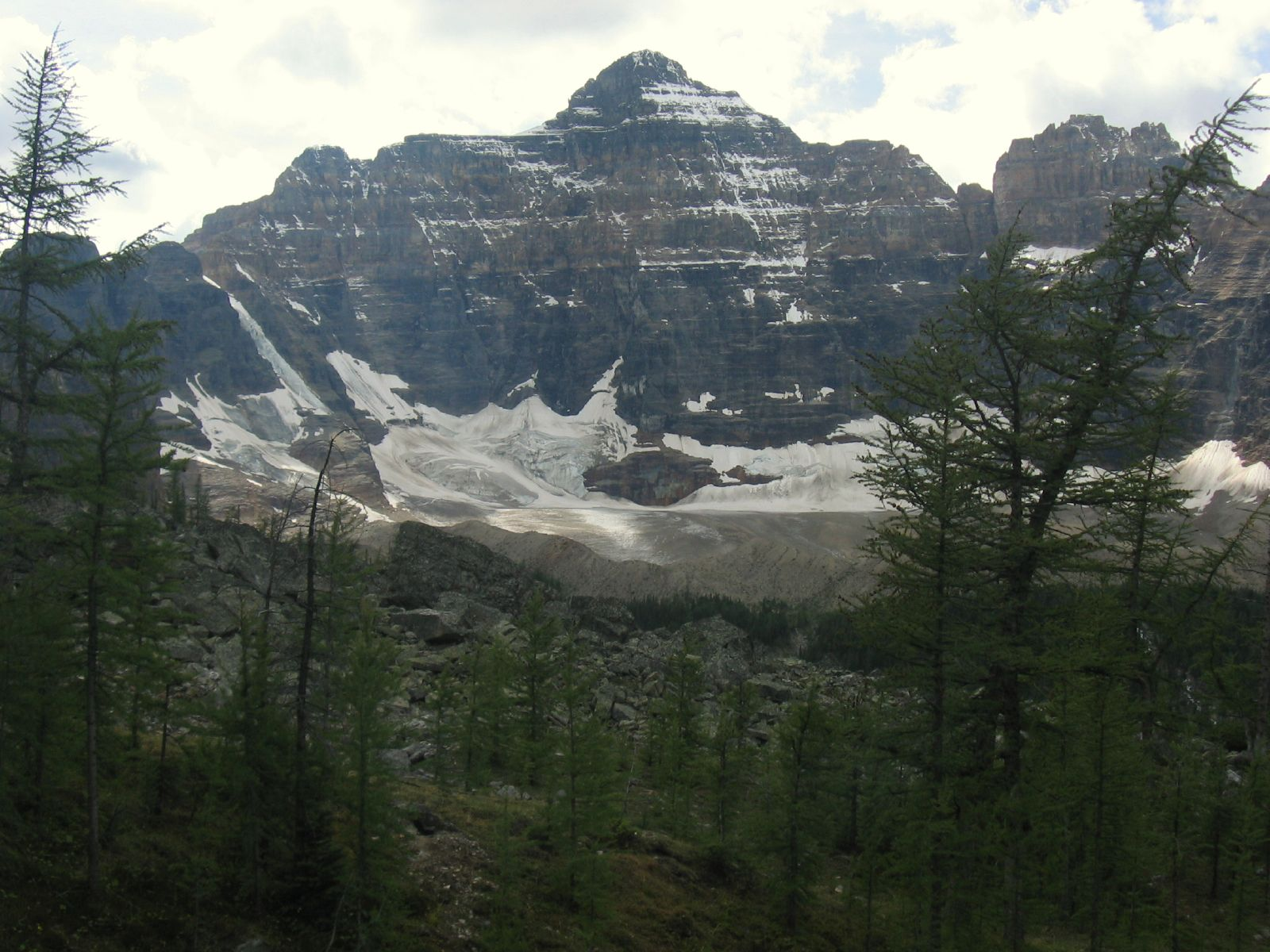
As seen from Paradise Valley in 2007

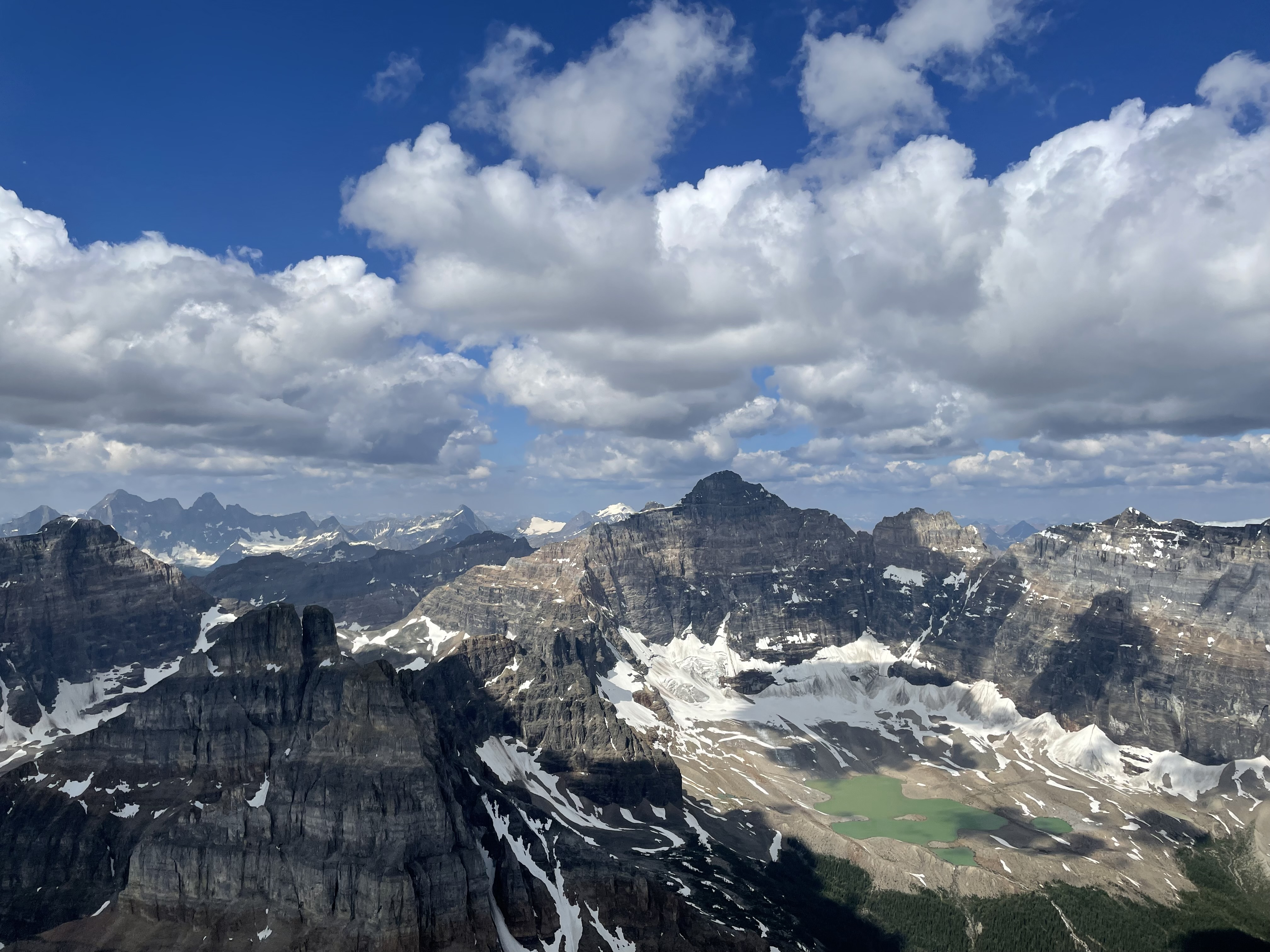
Hungabee Mountain & Paradise Valley

== See also ==
- List of peaks on the Alberta–British Columbia border
