= Tonsa Peak =

Mountain summit in Canada

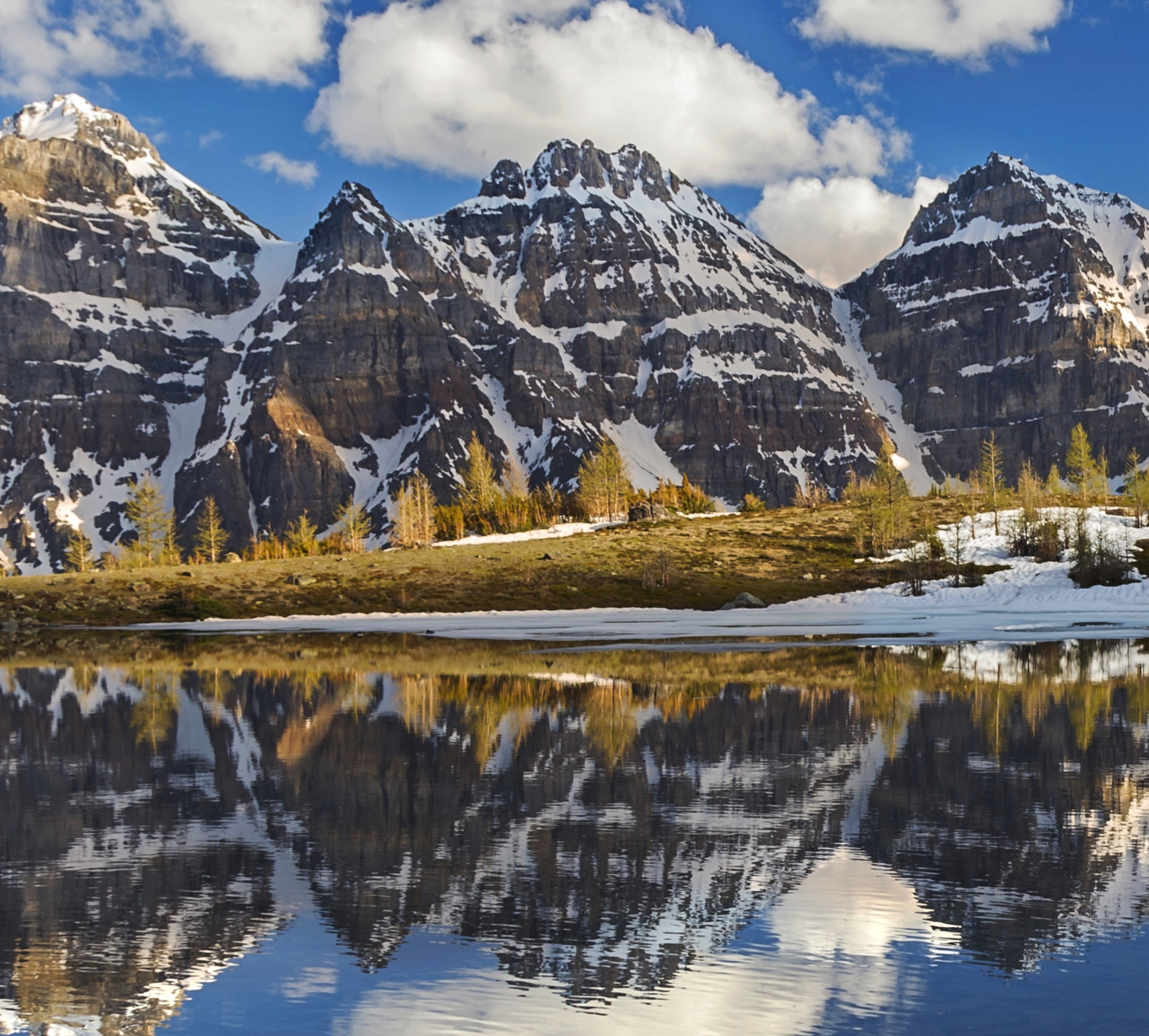
- Tonsa Peak (center) seen from Larch Valley flanked by Mount Bowlen on left and Mount Perren on right

Highest point
- Elevation: 3,053 m (10,016 ft)
- Prominence: 173 m (568 ft)
- Parent peak: Mount Bowlen (3,072 m)
- Listing: Mountains of Alberta; Mountains of British Columbia
- Coordinates: 51°17′51″N 116°12′00″W

Geography
- Location within Alberta Location within British Columbia Location within Canada
- Interactive map of Tonsa
- Country: Canada
- Provinces: Alberta and British Columbia
- Protected area: Banff National Park
- Parent range: Bow Range; Canadian Rockies
- Topo map: NTS 82N8 Lake Louise

Tonsa Peak is a 3,053-metre (10,016 ft) mountain summit located on the border of Alberta and British Columbia on the Continental Divide in the Canadian Rockies. The mountain forms part of the backdrop to Moraine Lake in the Valley of the Ten Peaks of Banff National Park. It was named in 1894 by Samuel E.S. Allen for the Stoney Indian word for the number four.

== Geology ==
Like other mountains in Banff Park, Tonsa is composed of sedimentary rock laid down during the Precambrian to Jurassic periods. Formed in shallow seas, this sedimentary rock was pushed east and over the top of younger rock during the Laramide orogeny.

== Climate ==
Based on the Köppen climate classification, Tonsa Peak is located in a subarctic climate zone with cold, snowy winters, and mild summers. Winter temperatures can drop below −20 °C with wind chill factors below −30 °C. Precipitation runoff from Tonsa Peak drains east into tributaries of the Bow River, or west into tributaries of the Vermilion River.

== See also ==
- List of peaks on the British Columbia–Alberta border
- Geography of Alberta
- Geography of British Columbia

== Gallery ==
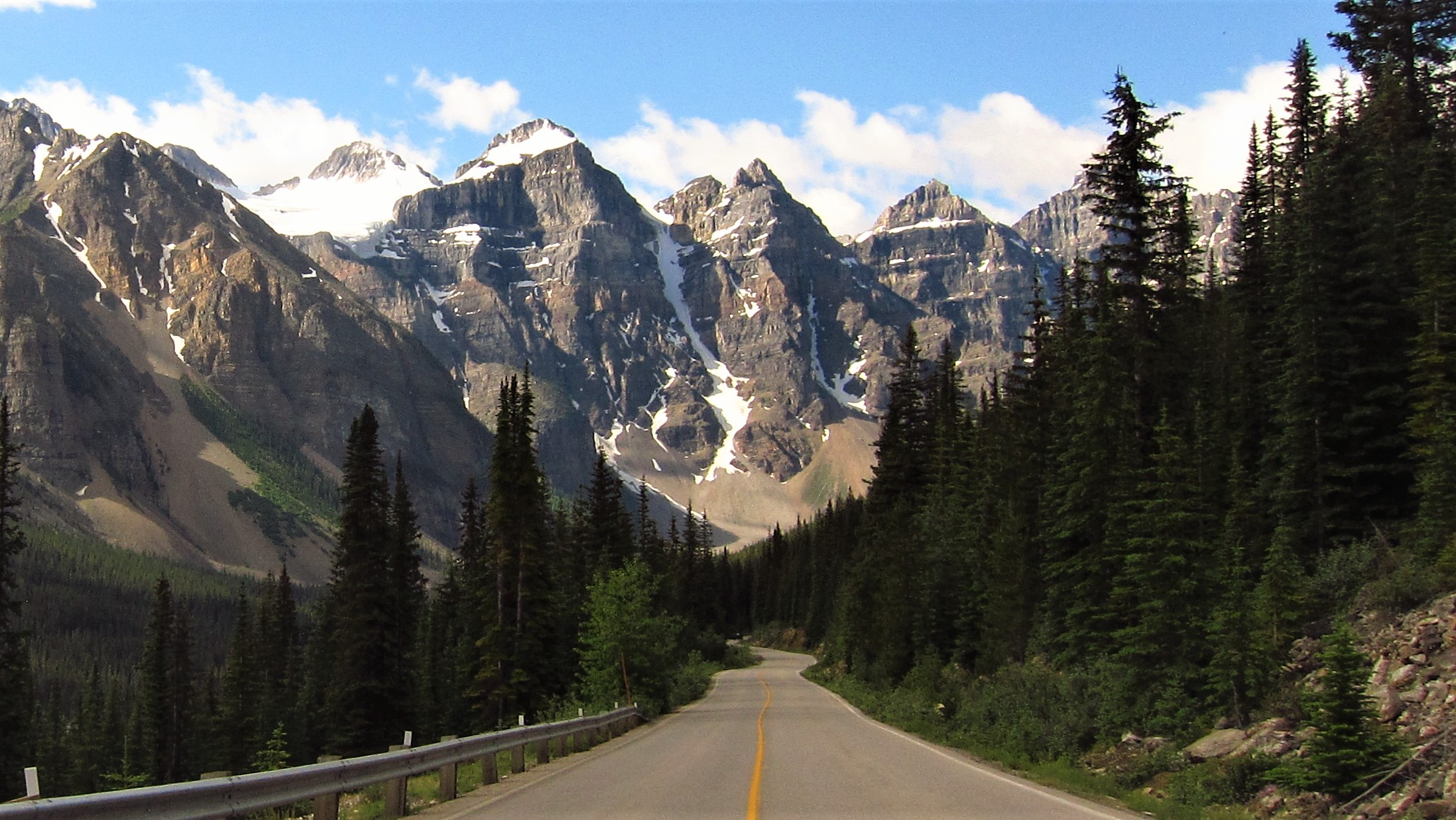
Road to Moraine Lake, yellow centerline aimed at Tonsa Peak

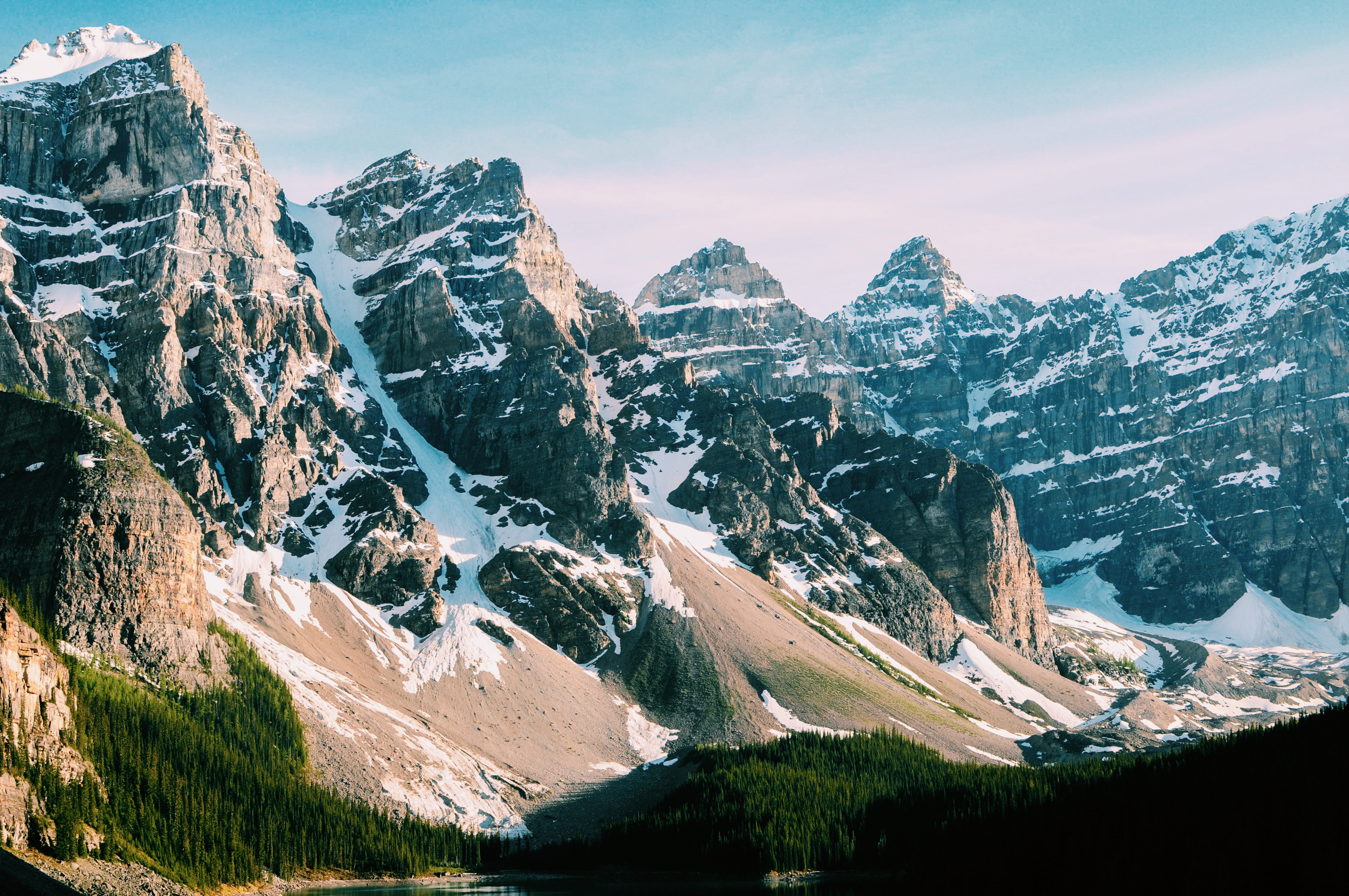
Tonsa Peak to left of center

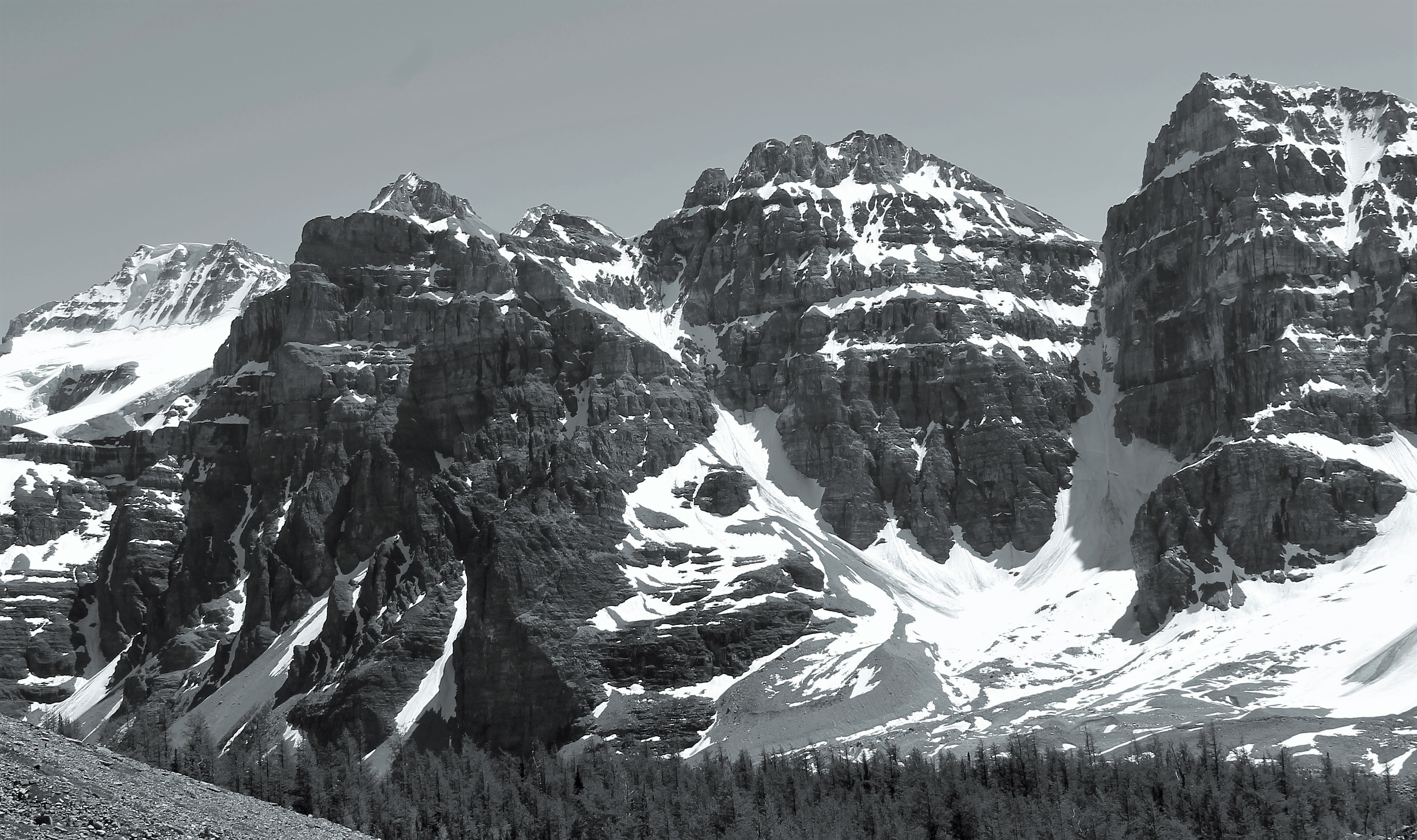
Left to right: Fay, Bowlen, Tonsa, Perren

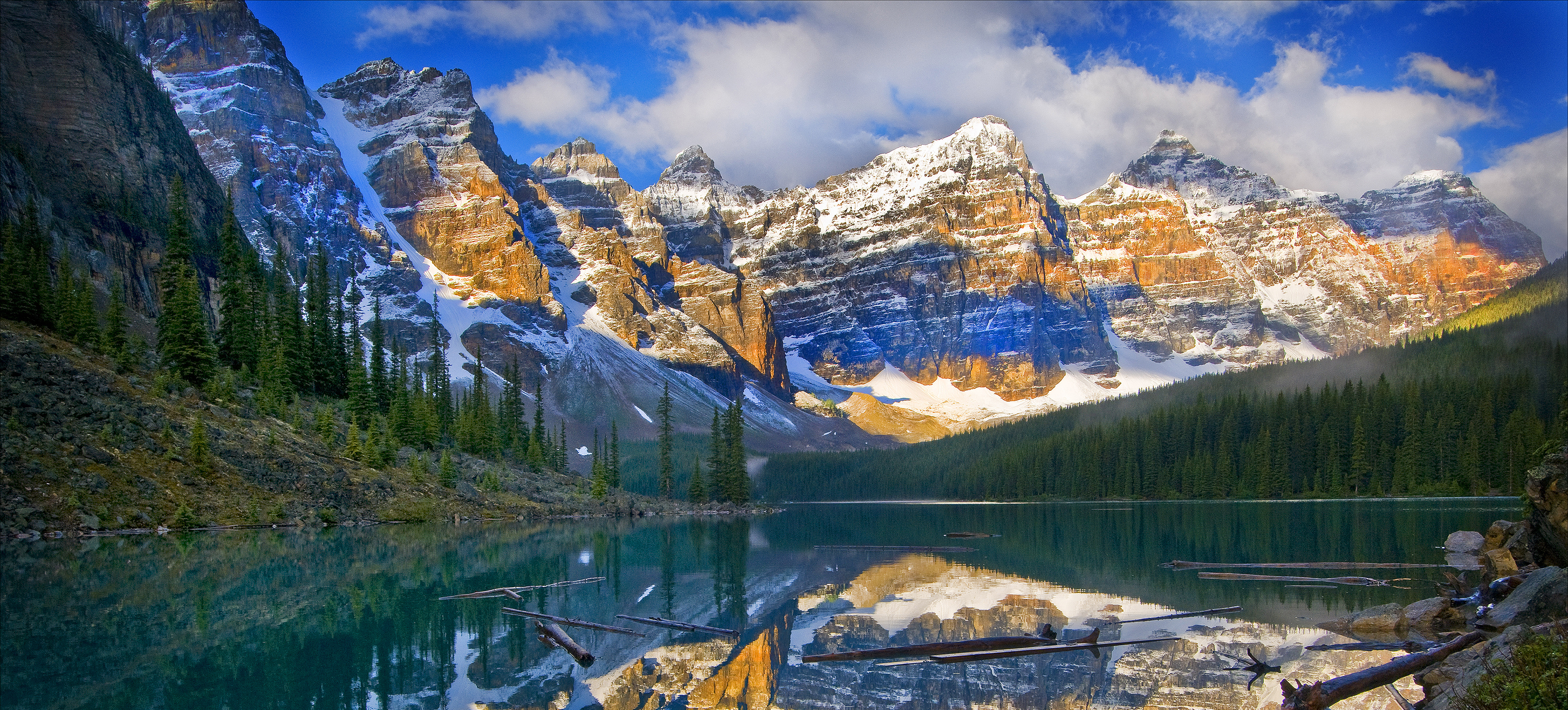
Moraine Lake peaks

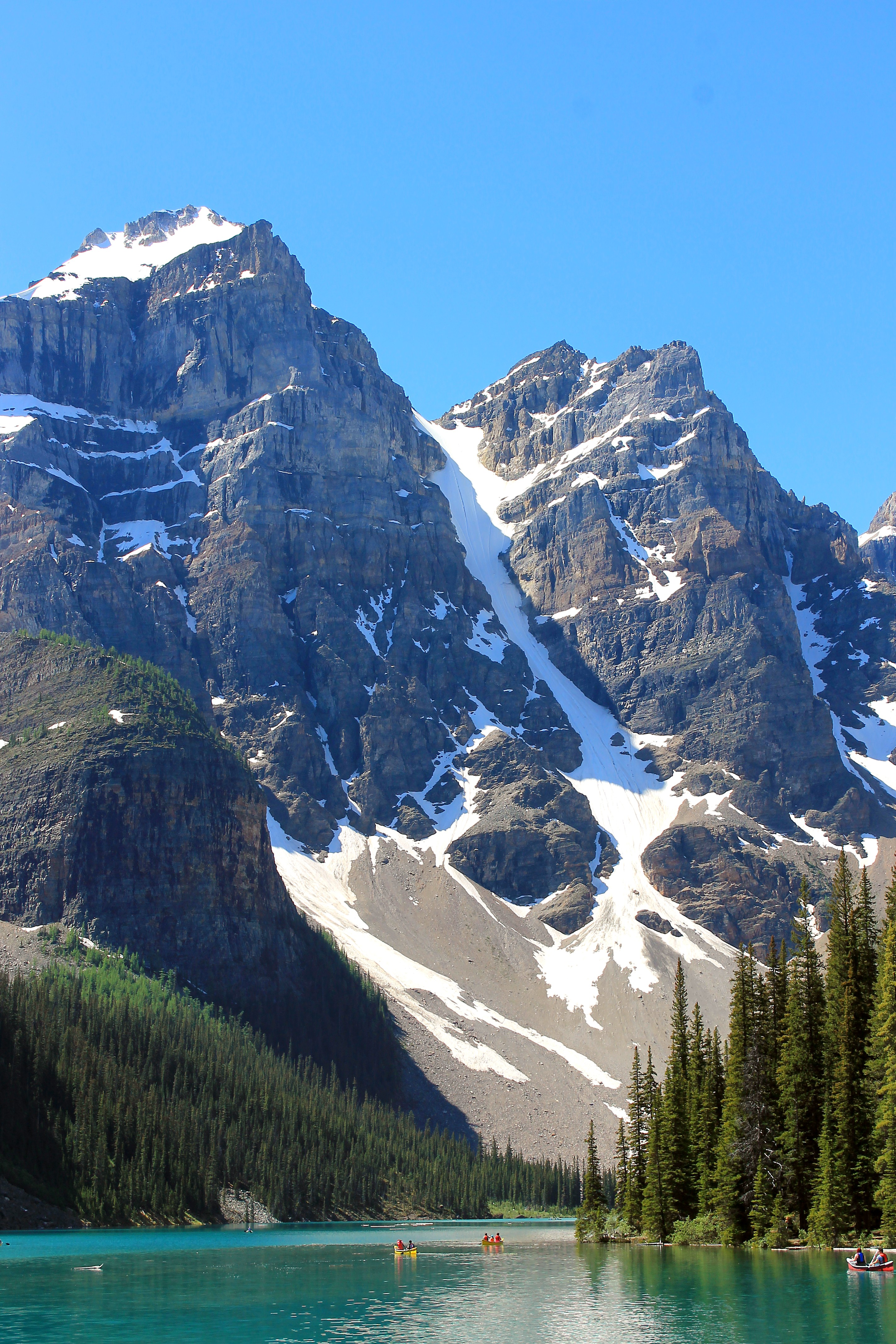
Mt. Bowlen and Tonsa Peak

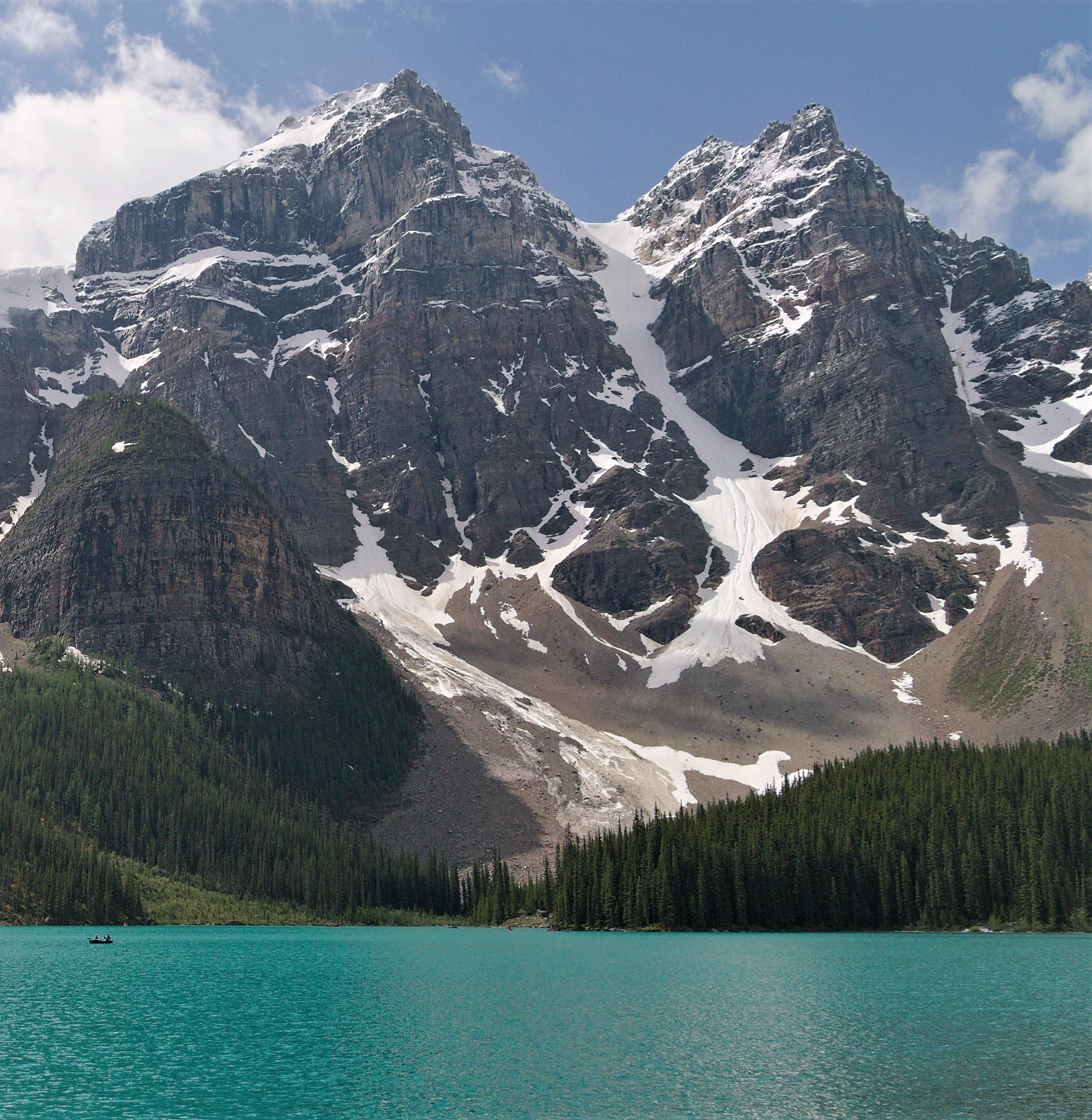
Mt. Bowlen (left) and Tonsa Peak (right)

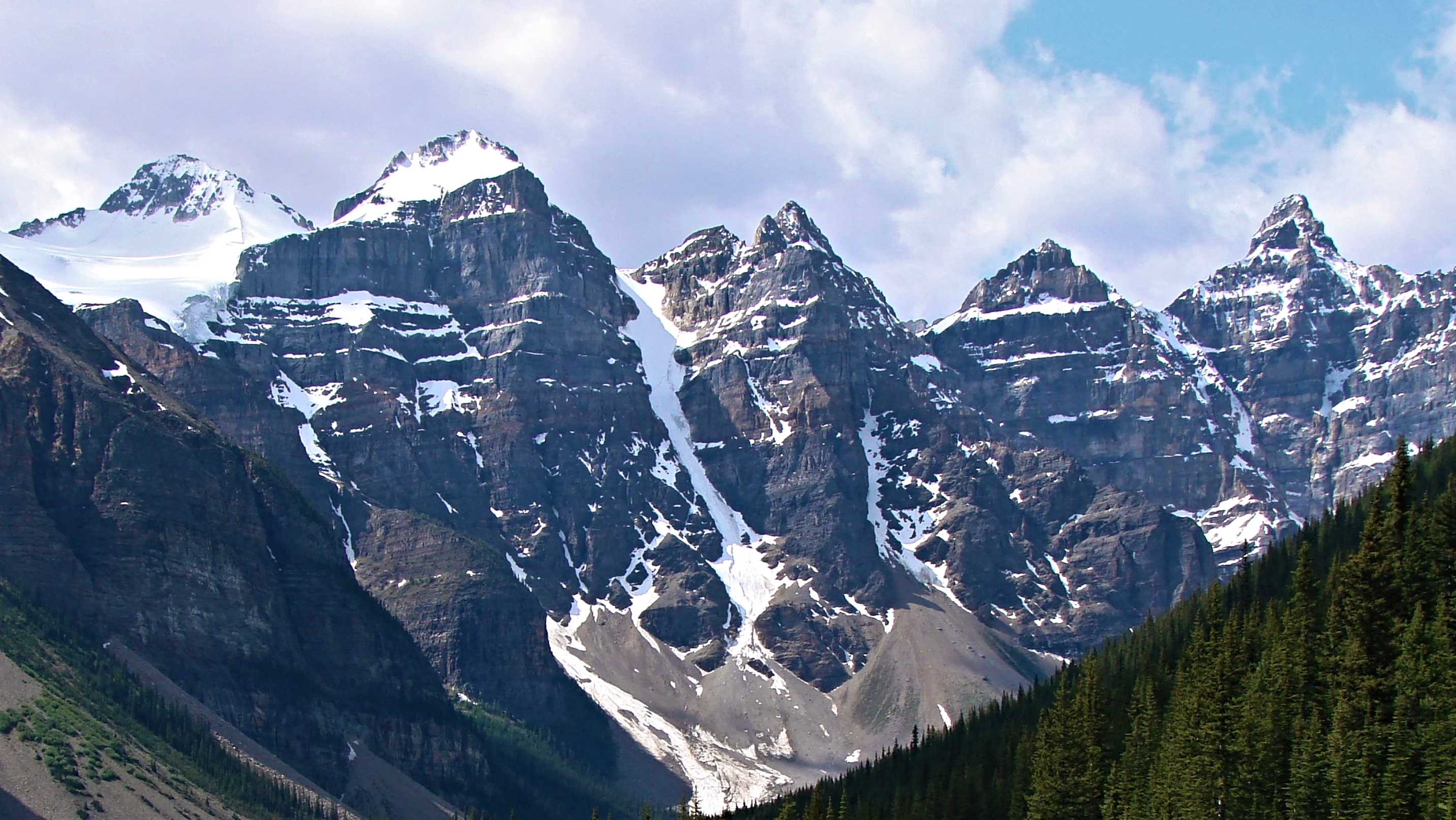
Tonsa Peak centered
