= Mount Babel (Alberta) =

Mountain peak in Alberta, Canada

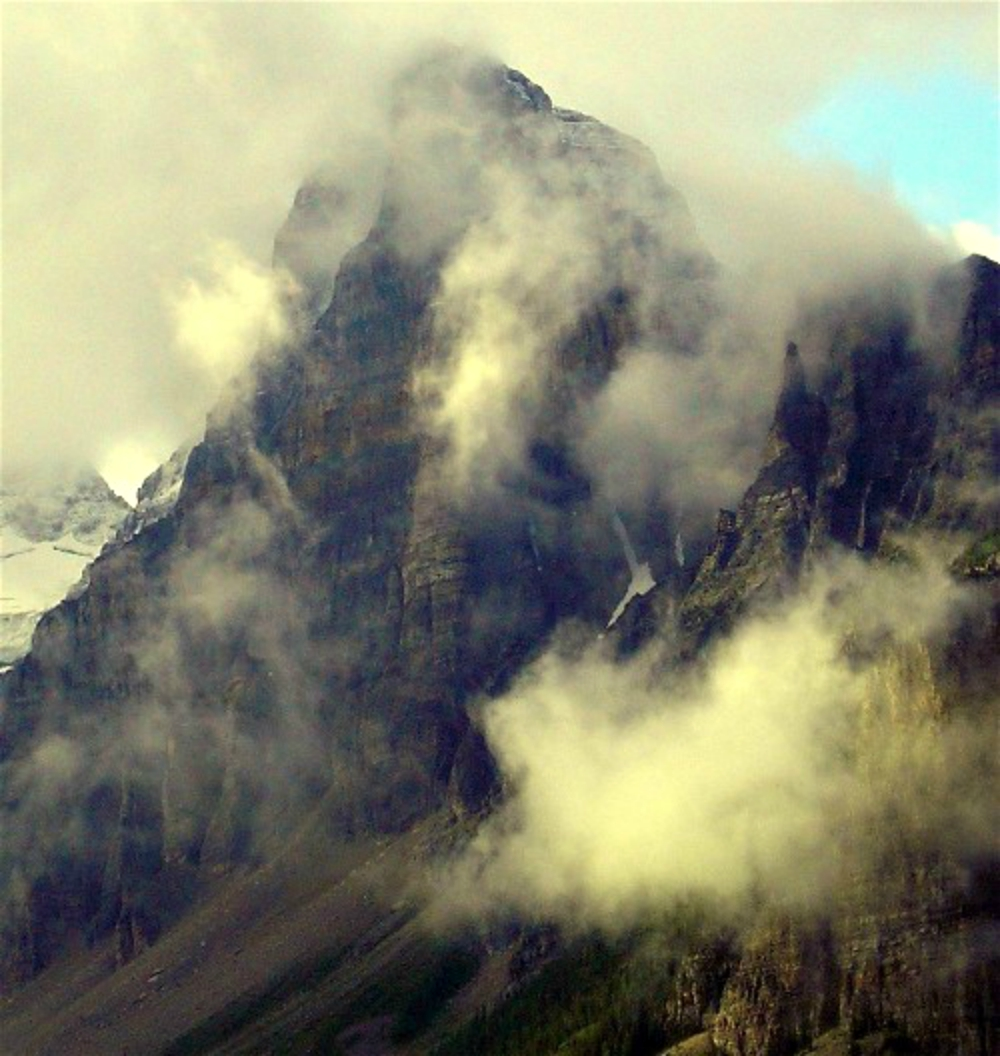

Highest point
- Elevation: 3,103 m (10,180 ft) (Note: Other sources state 3101 m.)
- Prominence: 200 m (660 ft)
- Parent peak: Mount Fay (3235 m)
- Listing: Mountains of Alberta
- Coordinates: 51°18′23″N 116°09′48″W

Geography
- Location within Alberta
- Country: Canada
- Province: Alberta
- Protected area: Banff National Park
- Parent range: Bow Range
- Topo map: NTS 82N8 Lake Louise

Climbing
- First ascent: 1910
- Easiest route: East Face IV 5.10

Mount Babel is a mountain peak of the Bow Range in Banff National Park, Alberta, Canada. The mountain can be seen from the Valley of the Ten Peaks.

Mount Babel was first climbed by A Hart, Edward Oliver Wheeler, L. Wilson, H. Worsfold and Conrad Kain on July 23, 1910.

== Geology ==
Like other mountains in Banff Park, Mount Babel is composed of sedimentary rock laid down during the Precambrian to Jurassic periods. Formed in shallow seas, this sedimentary rock was pushed east and over the top of younger rock during the Laramide orogeny.

== Climate ==
Based on the Köppen climate classification, Mount Babel is located in a subarctic climate with cold, snowy winters, and mild summers. Temperatures can drop below −20 °C with wind chill factors below −30 °C.

== Tower of Babel ==
The Tower of Babel is a conspicuous quartzite monolith at the northern end of the mountain, and is apparent to park visitors at Moraine Lake. It was named in 1899 by Walter D. Wilcox because its profile reminded him of the biblical Tower of Babel. The first ascent of the tower was made in 1959 by G. Boles, B. Greenwood, and A. Washington. Mount Babel acquired its name from its outlier tower that rises 500 metres (1,640 ft) above Moraine Lake.

== See also ==
- Geology of the Rocky Mountains
- List of mountains in the Canadian Rockies

== Gallery ==
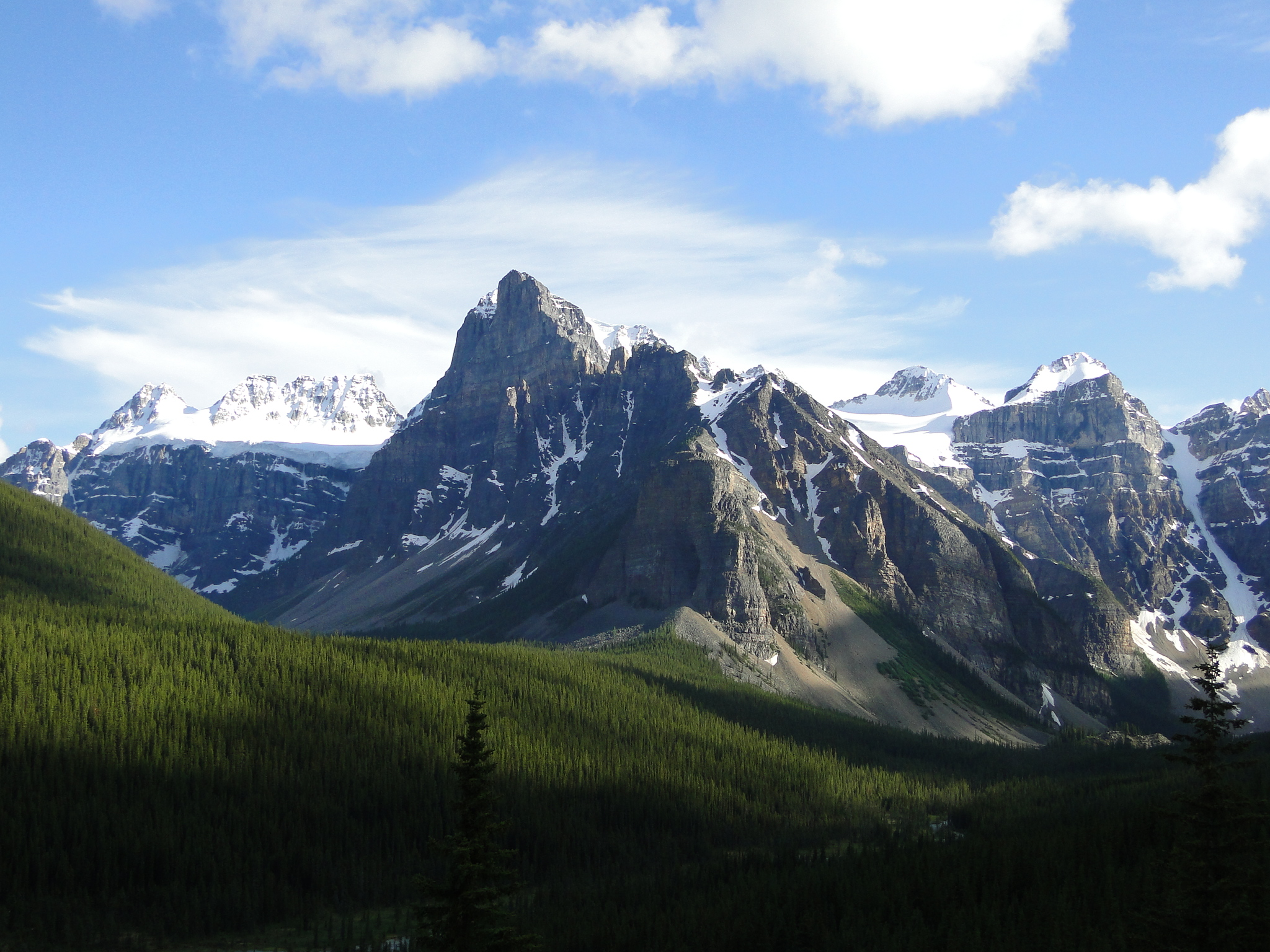
Mount Babel centered

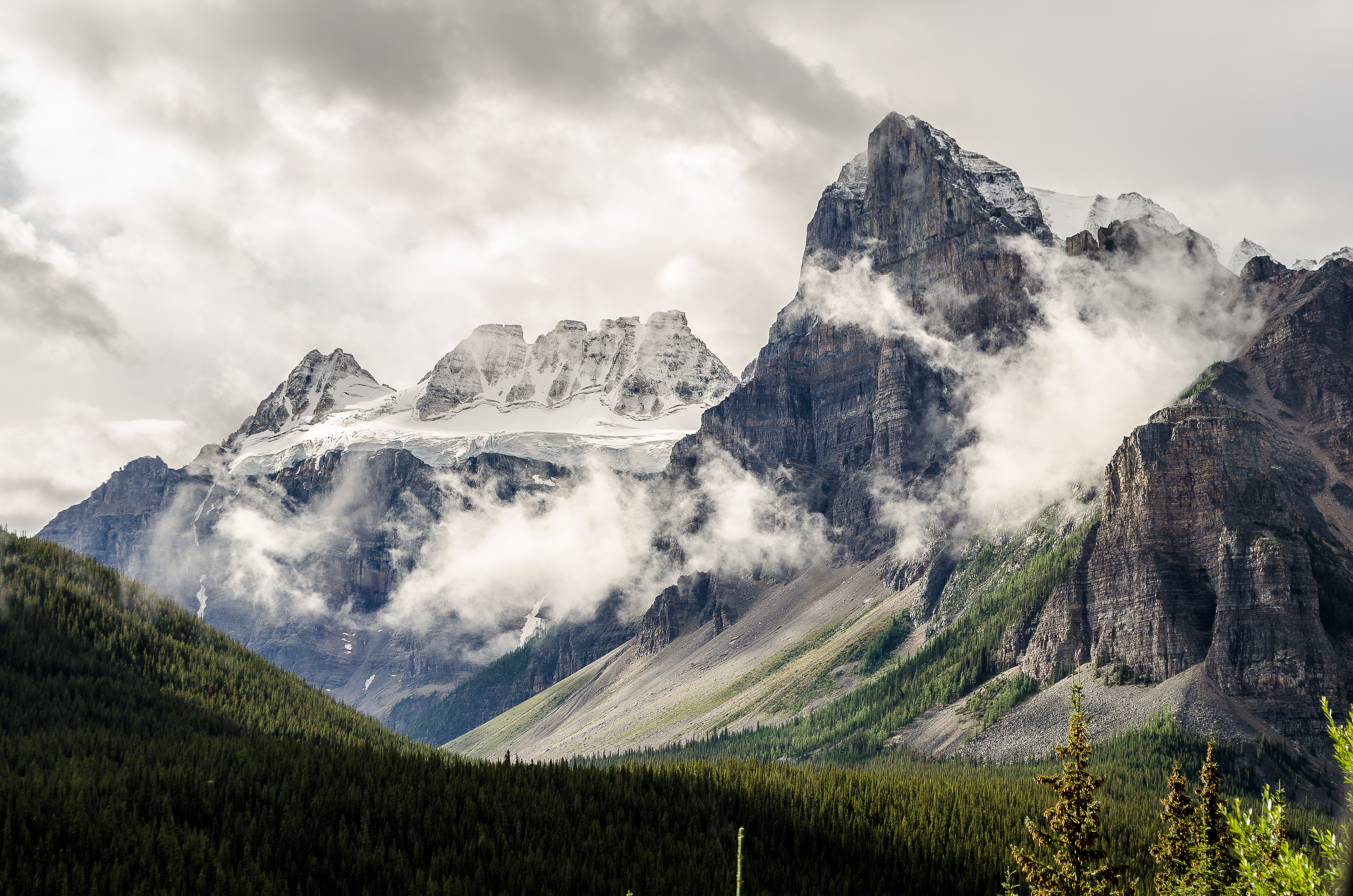
Bident, Quadra, and Babel

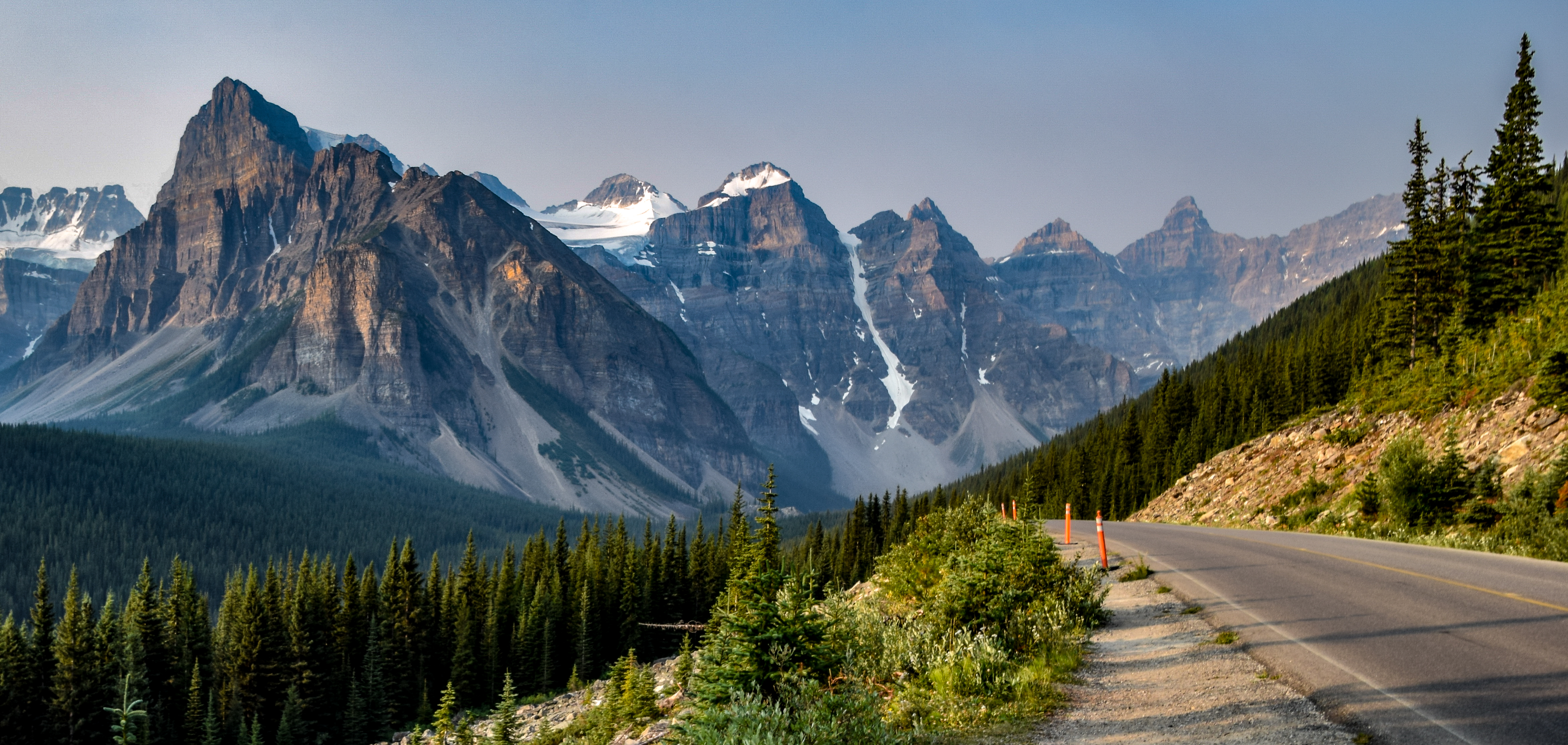
Babel (left) seen from road to Moraine Lake

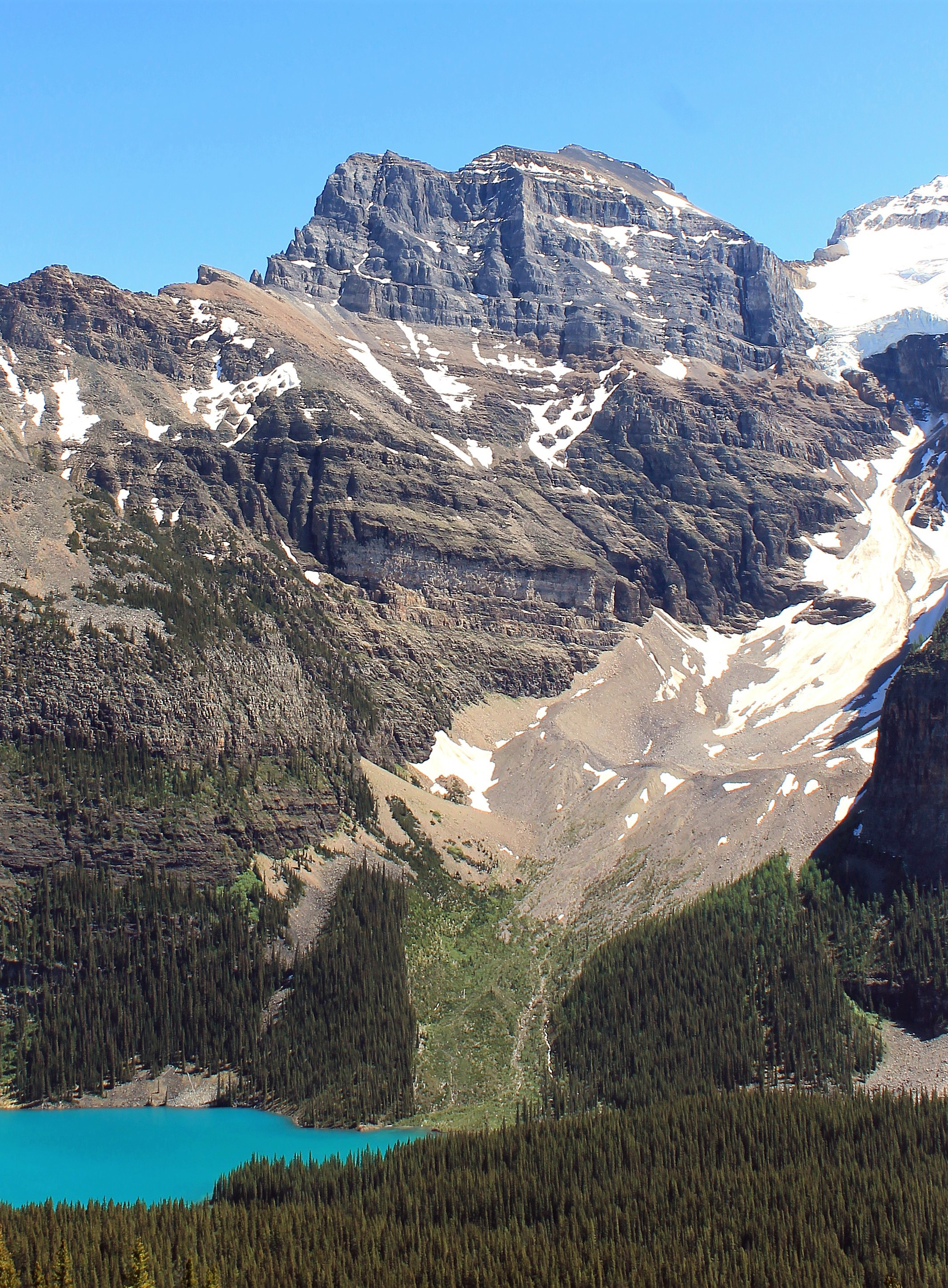
Mt. Babel from the northwest

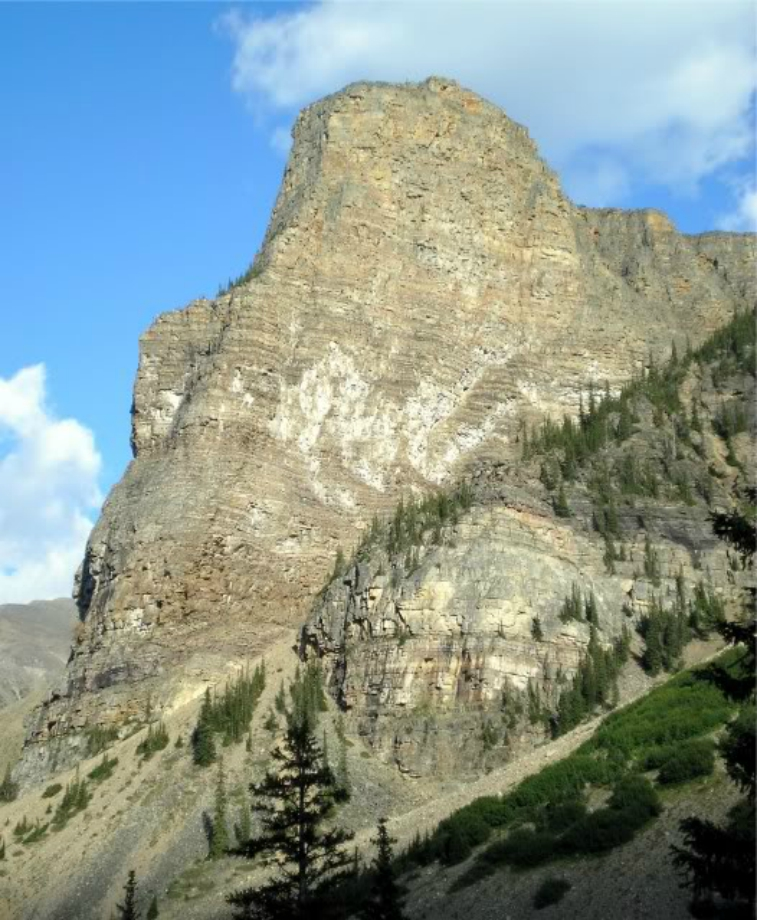
Tower of Babel
