= Mount Perren =

Mountain peak in Canada

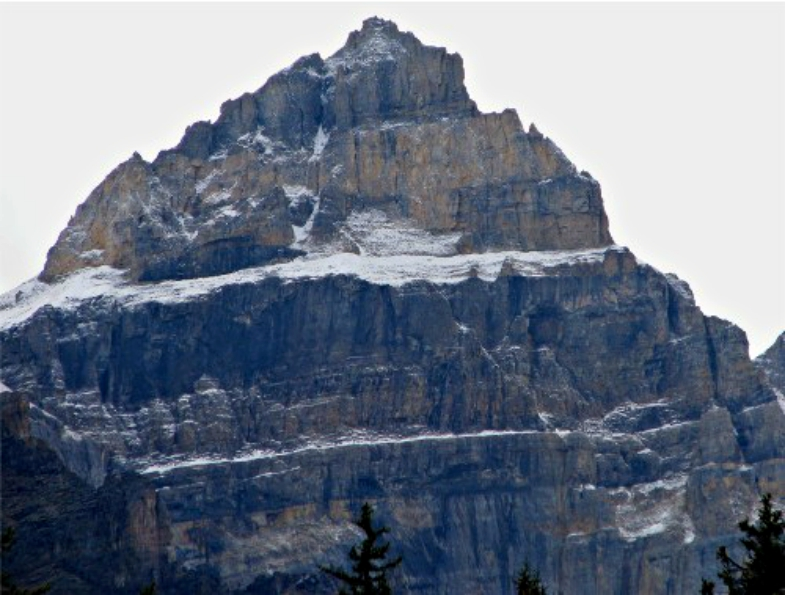
- Mount Perren

Highest point
- Elevation: 3,051 m (10,010 ft)
- Prominence: 113 m (371 ft)
- Parent peak: Mount Allen (3310 m)
- Listing: Mountains of Alberta; Mountains of British Columbia
- Coordinates: 51°17′47″N 116°12′32″W

Geography
- Location within Alberta Location within British Columbia Location within Canada
- Country: Canada
- Provinces: Alberta and British Columbia
- Protected areas: Banff National Park; Kootenay National Park
- Parent range: Bow Range
- Topo map: NTS 82N8 Lake Louise

Climbing
- First ascent: 1927 H.F. Ulrichs

Mount Perren is located on the border of Alberta and British Columbia on the Continental Divide. It was named in 1968 after Walter Perren, a Swiss climbing guide and Parks Canada service warden. The peak forms part of the backdrop to Moraine Lake in the Valley of the Ten Peaks of Banff National Park.

== Geology ==
The mountains in Banff Park are composed of sedimentary rock laid down during the Precambrian to Jurassic periods. Formed in shallow seas, this sedimentary rock was pushed east and over the top of younger rock during the Laramide orogeny.

== Climate ==
Based on the Köppen climate classification, the mountain has a subarctic climate with cold, snowy winters, and mild summers. Temperatures can drop below -20 C with wind chill factors below -30 C in the winter.

== Gallery ==
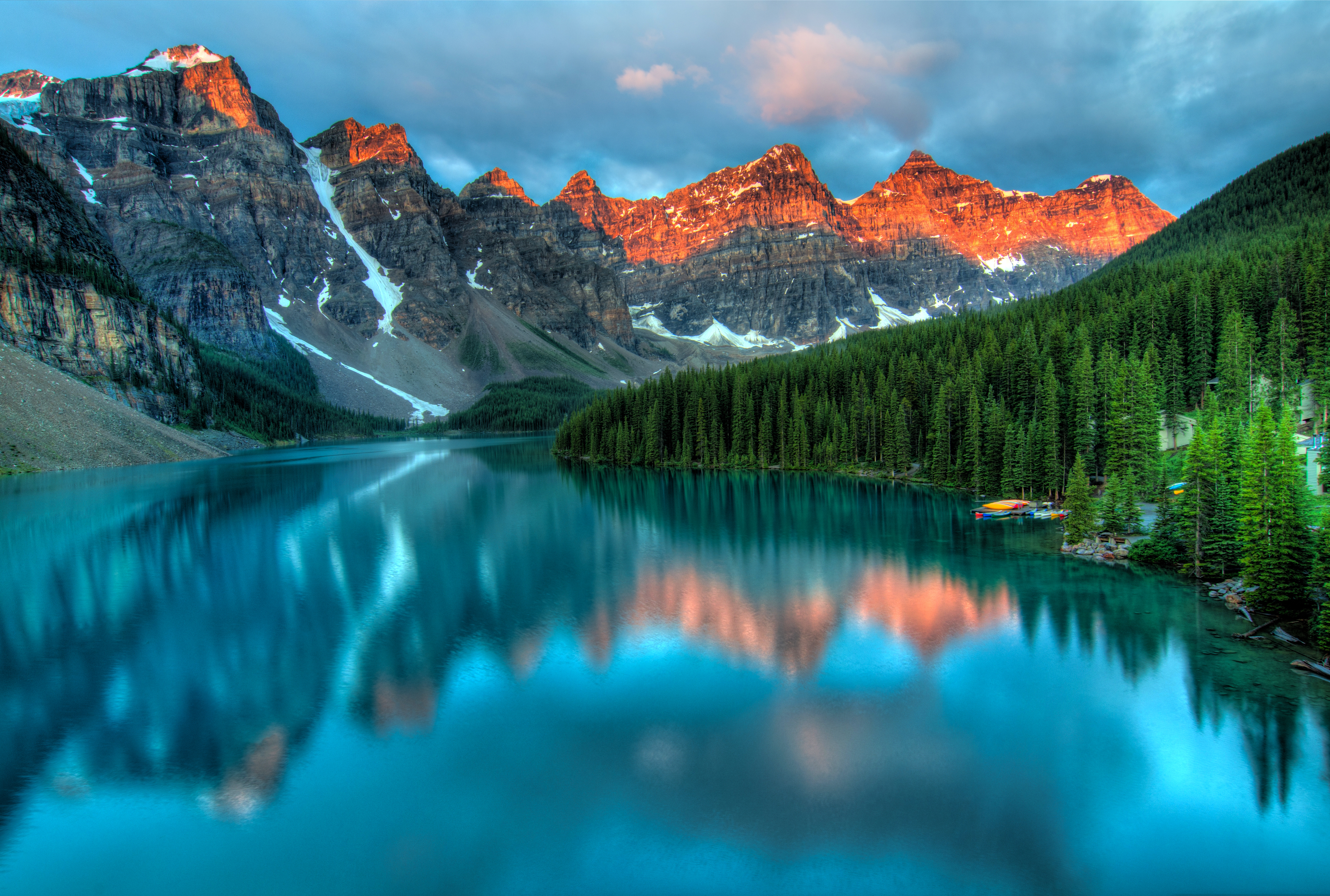
Moraine Lake with Mount Perren centered

== See also ==
- List of peaks on the British Columbia–Alberta border
