= Wenkchemna Peak =

Mountain on Alberta/British Columbia boundary in Canada

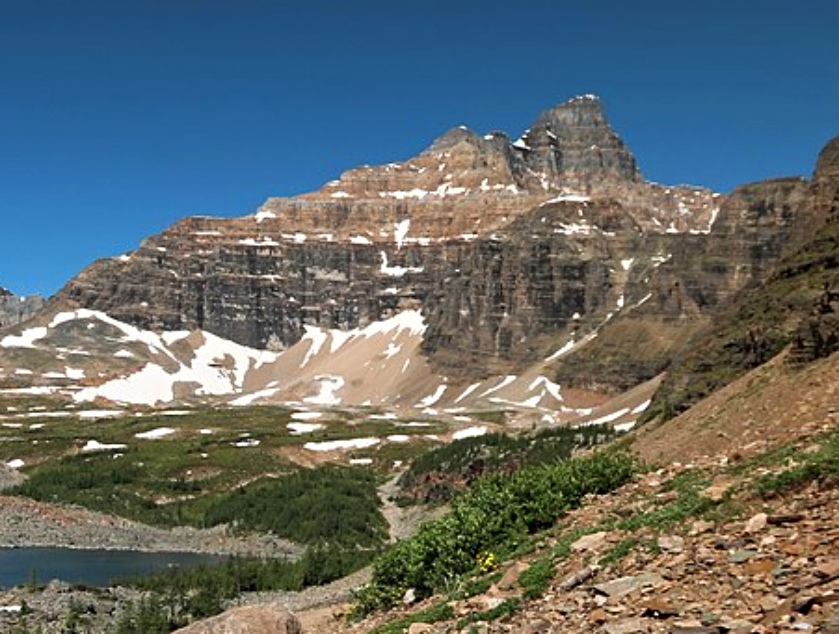
- Wenkchemna Peak

Highest point
- Elevation: 3,206 m (10,518 ft) (Note: Other sources give 3170 m.)
- Prominence: 16 m (52 ft)
- Parent peak: Mount Hungabee (3492 m)
- Listing: Mountains of Alberta; Mountains of British Columbia
- Coordinates: 51°19′43″N 116°16′35″W

Geography
- Location within Alberta Location within British Columbia Location within Canada
- Country: Canada
- Provinces: Alberta and British Columbia
- District: Kootenay Land District
- Protected areas: Banff National Park; Yoho National Park
- Parent range: Bow Range
- Topo map: NTS 82N8 Lake Louise

Geology
- Rock type: Sedimentary rock

Climbing
- First ascent: 1923 F.C. Bell, A.W. Drinnan, H. Herriot, T.B. Moffat, R. Neil, E. Thompson, R. Williams, Christian Hasler Jr.

Wenkchemna Peak is located on the SE ridge coming off of Mount Hungabee on the border of Alberta and British Columbia. It was named in 1894 by Samuel E. S. Allen for the Stoney Indian word for ten.

Wenkchemna is the 10th peak in The Valley of the Ten Peaks, as they are normally numbered (left to right as seen from Moraine Lake). It is an extension into the valley of the ridge formed by Mount Hungabee and Ringrose Peaks.

== Geology ==
Wenkchemna Peak is composed of sedimentary rock laid down during the Precambrian to Jurassic periods. Formed in shallow seas, this sedimentary rock was pushed east and over the top of younger rock during the Laramide orogeny.

== Climate ==
Based on the Köppen climate classification, Wenkchemna Peak is located in a subarctic climate zone with cold, snowy winters, and mild summers. Temperatures can drop below −20 °C with wind chill factors below −30 °C.

== See also ==
- List of peaks on the Alberta–British Columbia border
- List of mountains in the Canadian Rockies
