= Mount Tuzo =

Mountain peak in Alberta/British Columbia, Canada

- Sagowa
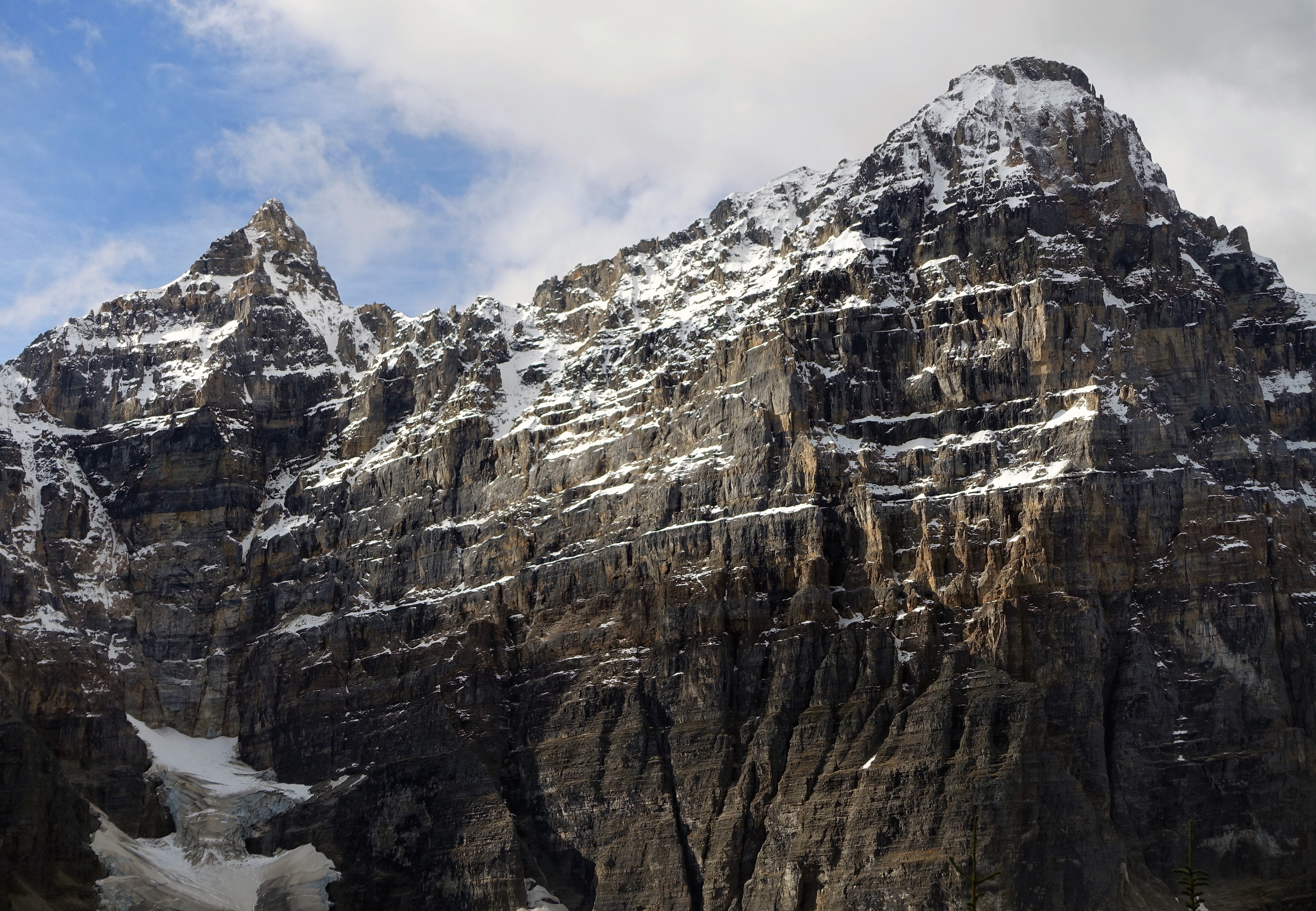
- Northeast aspect, right

Highest point
- Elevation: 3,246 m (10,650 ft)
- Prominence: 210 m (690 ft)
- Listing: Mountains of Alberta; Mountains of British Columbia
- Coordinates: 51°18′06″N 116°13′42″W

Geography
- Location within Alberta Location within British Columbia Location within Canada
- Country: Canada
- Provinces: Alberta and British Columbia
- Protected areas: Banff National Park; Kootenay National Park
- Parent range: Bow Range; Canadian Rockies
- Topo map: NTS 82N8 Lake Louise

Climbing
- First ascent: 15 September 1906; Henrietta Tuzo, Christian Kaufmann

Mount Tuzo is a mountain located within the Valley of the Ten Peaks in the Canadian Rockies, along the Continental Divide, which forms the provincial boundary between British Columbia and Alberta in Western Canada. It also lies on the boundary shared by Banff National Park and Kootenay National Park.

The mountain was named in 1907 after its first ascendant, Henrietta L. Tuzo. Tuzo was a charter member of the Alpine Club of Canada and later became the mother of the geologist John Tuzo Wilson. On his 1894 map, Samuel Allen had named the peak "Sagowa", which is the Nakoda word for seven as the mountain is seventh in order from south to north of the ten peaks.

== Geology ==
Like other mountains in Banff Park, Mount Tuzo is composed of sedimentary rock laid down from the Precambrian to Jurassic periods. Formed in shallow seas, this sedimentary rock was pushed east and over the top of younger rock during the Laramide orogeny.

== Climate ==
Based on the Köppen climate classification, Mount Tuzo is located in a subarctic climate zone with cold, snowy winters, and mild summers. Temperatures can drop below -20 °C with wind chill factors below -30 °C.

== See also ==
- List of peaks on the Alberta–British Columbia border
- List of mountains in the Canadian Rockies

== Gallery ==
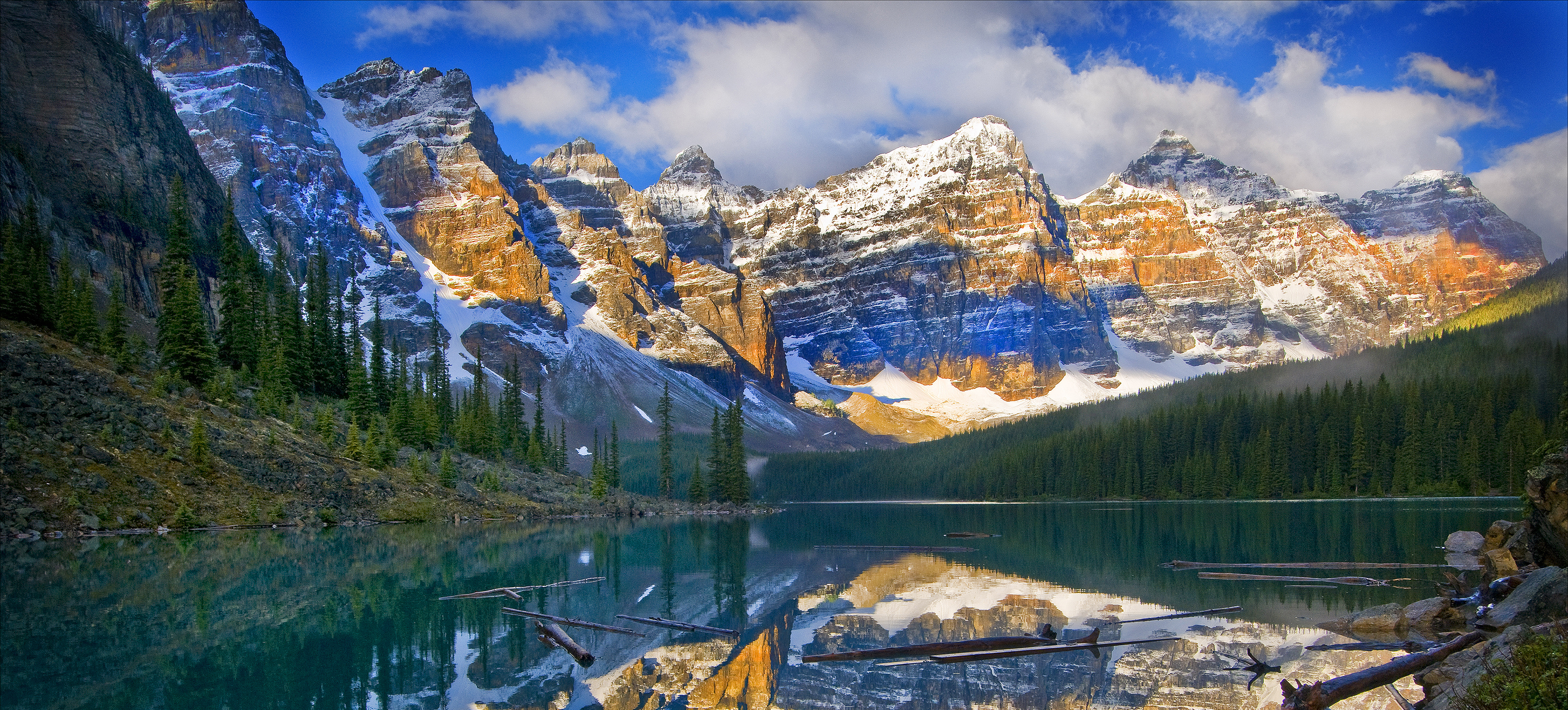
Tuzo (right of center) from Moraine Lake

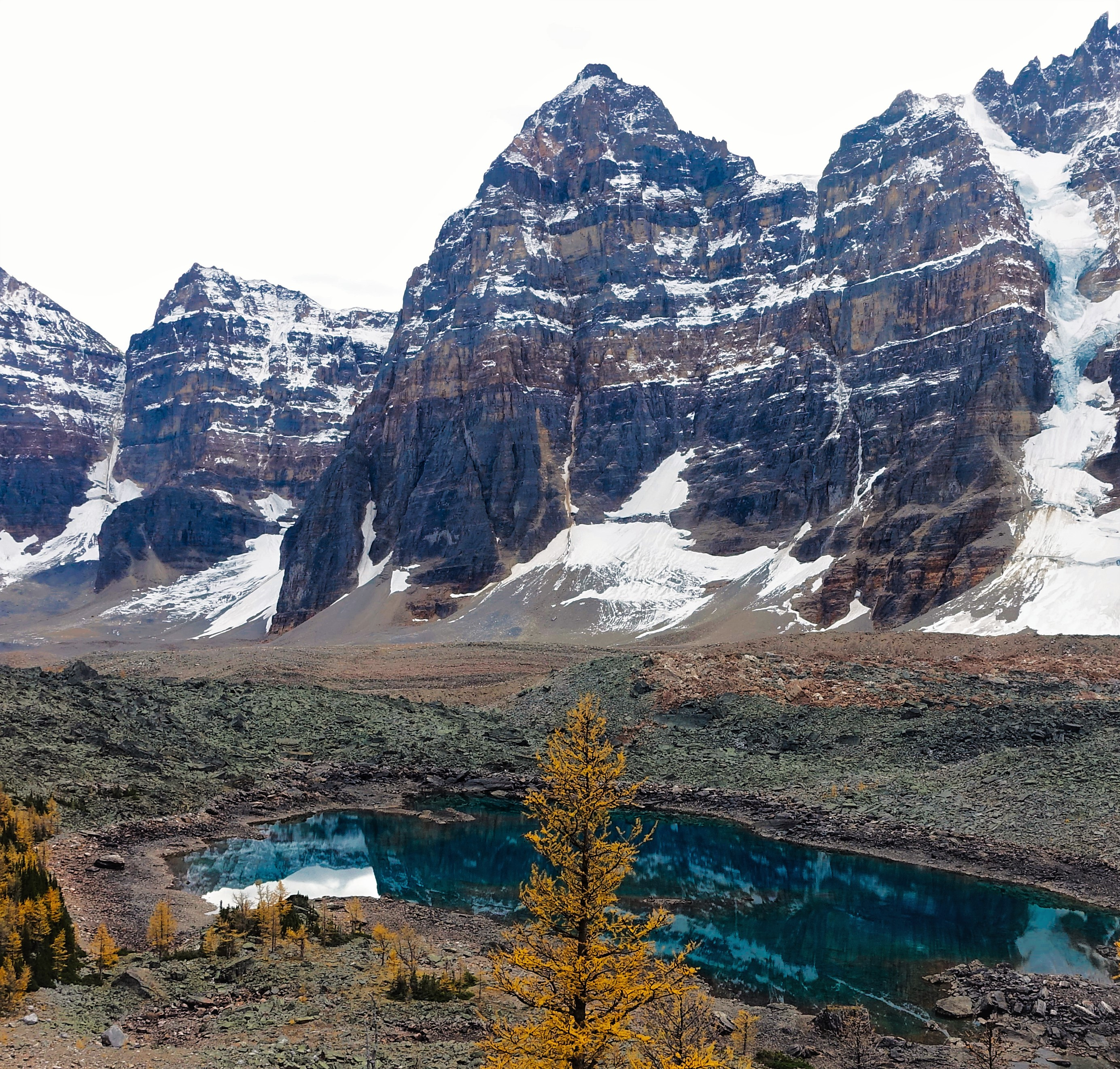
Northwest aspect from Eiffel Lake
