= Mount Allen (Bow Range) =

Mountain the Alberta/British Columbia border in Canada

- Shappee
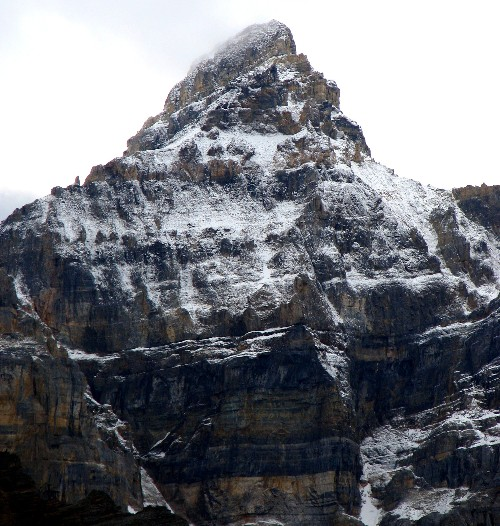

Highest point
- Elevation: 3,310 m (10,860 ft)
- Prominence: 260 m (850 ft) (Note: Prominence based on summit elevation of 3280 m.)
- Listing: Mountains of Alberta; Mountains of British Columbia
- Coordinates: 51°17′33″N 116°13′12″W

Geography
- Location within Alberta Location within British Columbia Location within Canada
- Interactive map of
- Country: Canada
- Provinces: Alberta and British Columbia
- Parks: Banff and Yoho
- Parent range: Bow Range
- Topo map: NTS 82N8 Lake Louise

Climbing
- First ascent: 1904 Gertrude Benham, Christian Kaufmann

Mount Allen is a mountain in the Canadian Rockies, on the Continental Divide, which forms the provincial boundary between British Columbia and Alberta in this region. J. Monroe Thorington named this mountain for Samuel Evans Stokes Allen in 1924. Allen was an American cartographer who mapped this area of the Rockies in 1894–1895. Allen had named this mountain "Shappee", the Stoney language word for "six", as part of his naming of the ten mountains in the Valley of the Ten Peaks. The peak forms part of the backdrop to Moraine Lake in Banff National Park.

== Geology ==
The mountains in Banff Park are composed of sedimentary rock laid down during the Precambrian to Jurassic periods. Formed in shallow seas, this sedimentary rock was pushed east and over the top of younger rock during the Laramide orogeny.

== Climate ==
Based on the Köppen climate classification, the mountain has a subarctic climate with cold, snowy winters, and mild summers. Temperatures can drop below −20 °C with wind chill factors below −30 °C in the winter.

== See also ==
- List of peaks on the Alberta–British Columbia border
- List of mountains in the Canadian Rockies

== Gallery ==
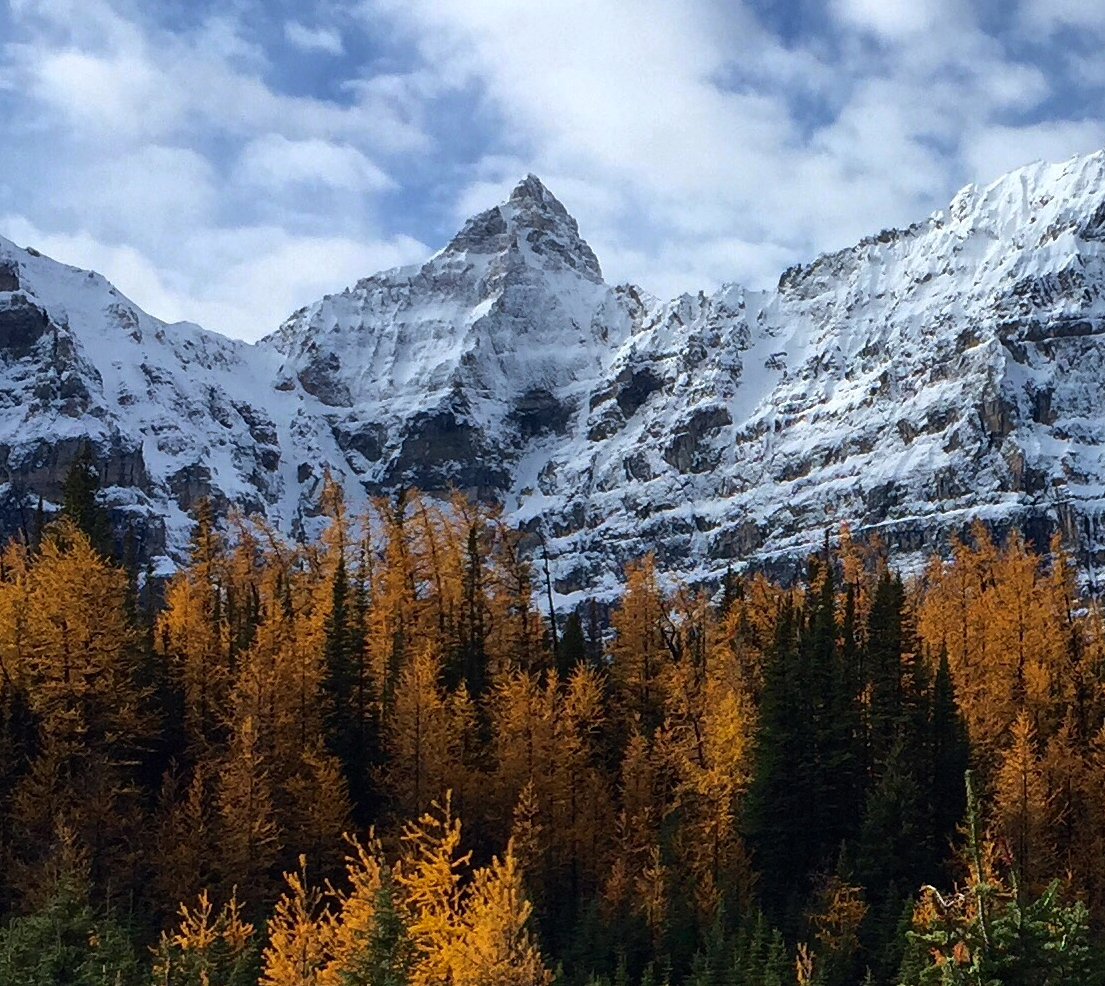
Allen from Larch Valley

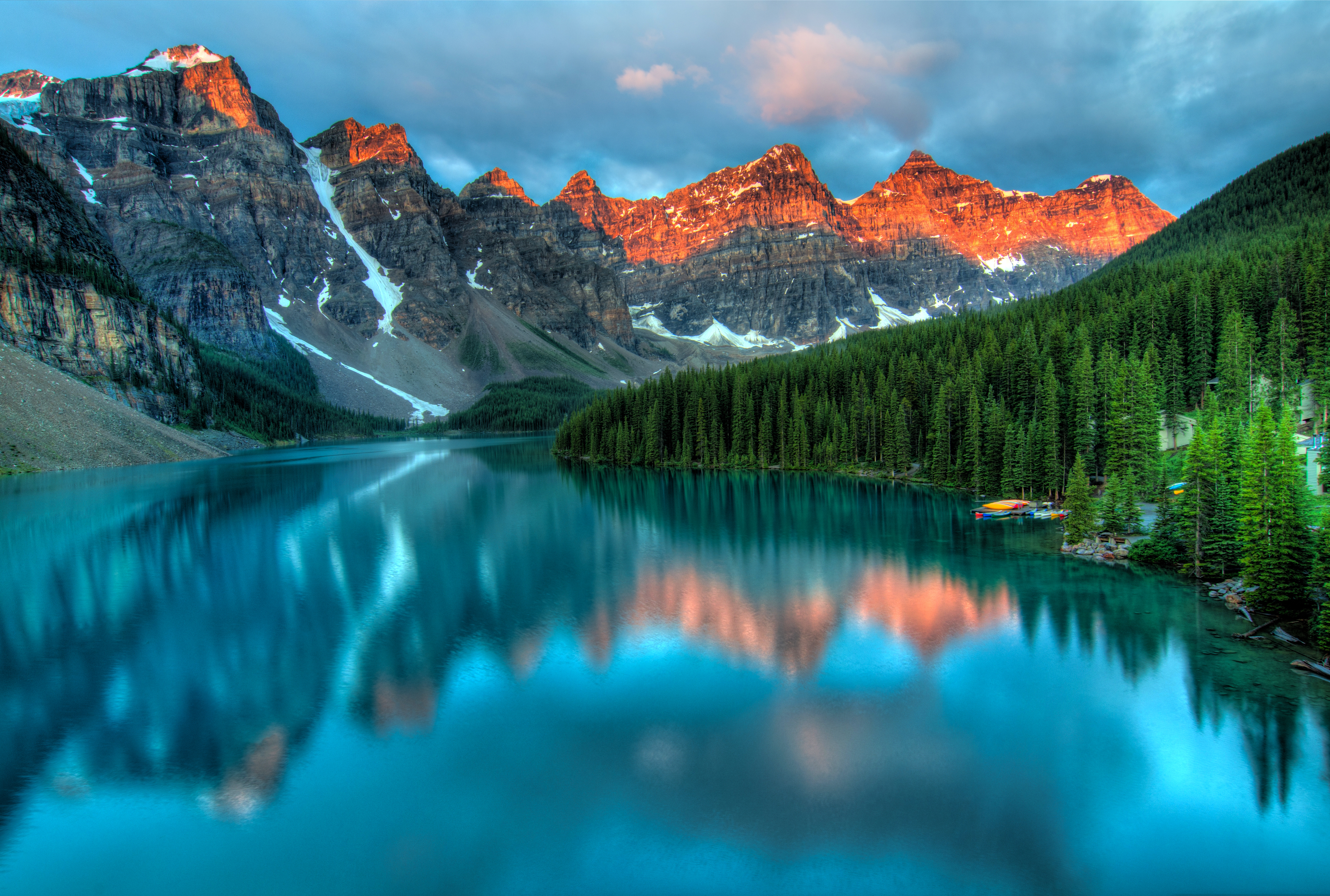
Moraine Lake with Mount Allen centered
