= Valley of the Ten Peaks =

Valley in Alberta, Canada

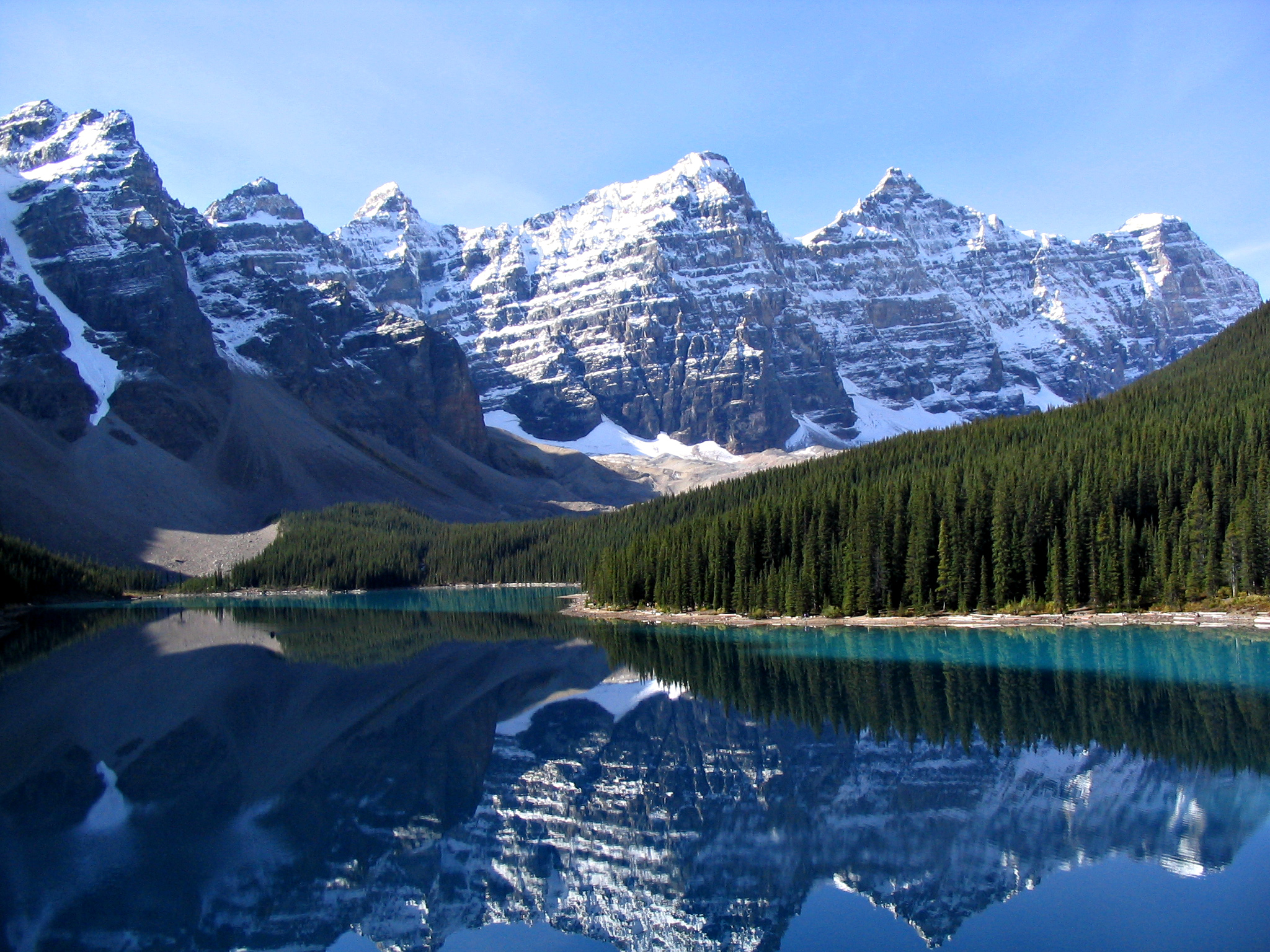
- The reflections of some of the Ten Peaks on Moraine Lake.

- Location within Alberta

Geography
- Country: Canada
- Province: Alberta
- Borders on: Wenkchemna Peaks
- Coordinates: 51°20′58″N 116°09′35″W
- Topo map: NTS 82N8 Lake Louise
- Traversed by: Moraine Lake Road, Larch Valley Trail
- River: Moraine Creek
- Interactive map of Valley of the Ten Peaks

Valley of the Ten Peaks (French: Vallée des Dix Pics) is a valley in Banff National Park in Alberta, Canada, which is crowned by ten notable peaks and also includes Moraine Lake. The valley can be reached by following the Moraine Lake road near Lake Louise. The ten peaks were originally named by Samuel Allen, an early explorer of the region, who simply referred to them by using the numerals from one to ten in the Stoney First Nations Language. He may have learned the terms from his Native American guides, who helped him with the horses. The Nakoda–also known as the Stoney Indians–is a tribe whose culture and dialect are closely related to that of the Assiniboine First Nation, from whom they are believed to have separated in the mid-1700s, and who roamed large parts of the prairies and mountains of western Alberta well into British Columbia. The secluded Valley of the Ten Peaks was part of their original homeland. Gradually, though, all but three of the mountains were renamed in honour of noteworthy individuals, including Allen himself.

Mount Hungabee was not included in the original peak list by Allen, even though it is higher than Wenkchemna Peak, the latter of which is really an extension of Hungabee.

== Peaks ==
The ten peaks, in order of how they are numbered from east to west, are:

#	Name	Elevation		Prominence		FA	Coordinates
#	Name	m	ft	m	ft	FA	Coordinates
1	Mount Fay	3,235	10,614	1,544	5,066	1904	51°17'58"N, 116°9'43"W
2	Mount Little	3,134	10,282	164	538	1901	51°17'45"N, 116°10'58"W
3	Mount Bowlen	3,206	10,518	170	560	1901	51°18'6"N, 116°11'22"W
4	Tonsa Peak	3,053	10,016	173	568		
5	Mount Perren	3,051	10,010	113	371	1927	51°17'47"N, 116°12'32"W
6	Mount Allen	3,310	10,860	260	850	1904	
7	Mount Tuzo	3,246	10,650	210	690	1906	51°18'6"N, 116°13'42"W
8	Deltaform Mountain	3,424	11,234	822	2,697	1903	51°18'6"N, 116°14'43"W
9	Neptuak Mountain	3,233	10,607	151	495	1902	51°18'29"N, 116°15'28"W
10	Wenkchemna Peak	3,170	10,400	16	52	1923	51°19'43"N, 116°16'35"W

There are other peaks visible from within the valley as well, including Mount Temple, Mount Babel and Eiffel Peak. Fay Glacier is developed between Mount Babel, Mount Fay, Mount Little and Mount Bowlen.

The Valley of the Ten Peaks was featured on the reverse side of the 1969 and 1979 issues of the Canadian twenty dollar bill; see Scenes of Canada § $20 note.

The Neil Colgan Hut, a mountaineering destination and the highest permanent structure in Canada, can be reached in 8 to 12 hours of climbing the Perren Route from Moraine Lake.
