= Mount Bowlen =

Mountain in Alberta/BC, Canada

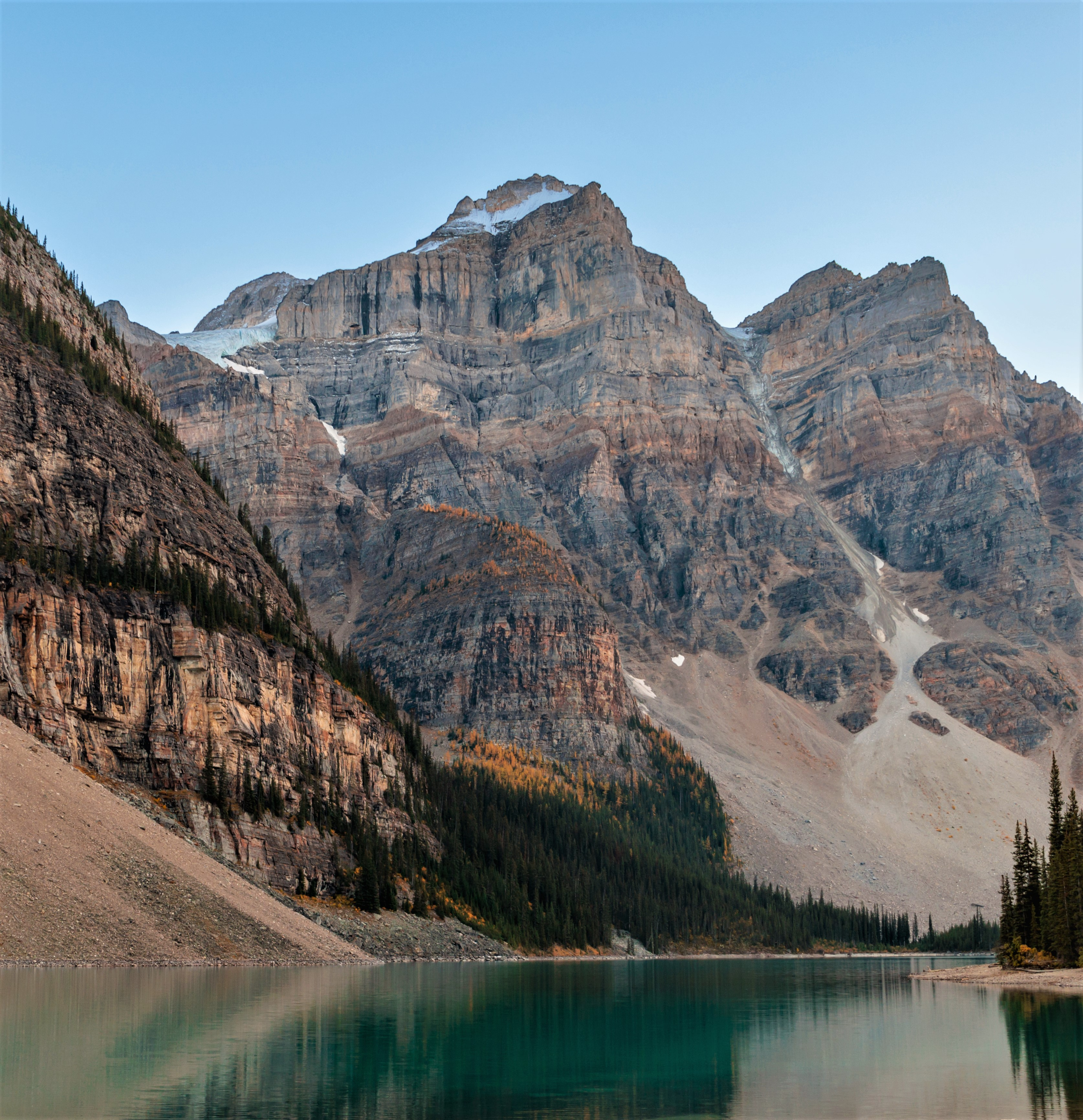
- Mount Bowlen from Moraine Lake

Highest point
- Elevation: 3,072 m (10,079 ft)
- Prominence: 170 m (560 ft)
- Listing: Mountains of Alberta; Mountains of British Columbia
- Coordinates: 51°18′06″N 116°11′22″W

Geography
- Location within Alberta Location within British Columbia Location within Canada
- Interactive map of Mount Bowlen
- Country: Canada
- Provinces: Alberta and British Columbia
- National Parks: Banff and Kootenay
- Parent range: Bow Range
- Topo map: NTS 82N8 Lake Louise

Climbing
- First ascent: 1901 G.T. Little, Charles S. Thompson, G.M. Weed, Hans Kaufmann

Mount Bowlen is located on the border of Alberta and British Columbia and forms part of the Valley of the Ten Peaks. It was named in 1953 after John J. Bowlen, a native of Prince Edward Island, successful Alberta rancher, honorary chief of the Blackfoot, and a Lieutenant Governor of Alberta. Its former name was "Yamnee", which translates to the number three in the local Nakoda (Stoney) language.

== Geology ==
The mountains in Banff Park are composed of sedimentary rock laid down during the Precambrian to Jurassic periods. Formed in shallow seas, this sedimentary rock was pushed east and over the top of younger rock during the Laramide orogeny.

== Climate ==
Based on the Köppen climate classification, the mountain has a subarctic climate with cold, snowy winters, and mild summers. Temperatures can drop below −20 °C (−4 °F) with wind chill factors below −30 °C (−22 °F) in the winter.

== Gallery ==
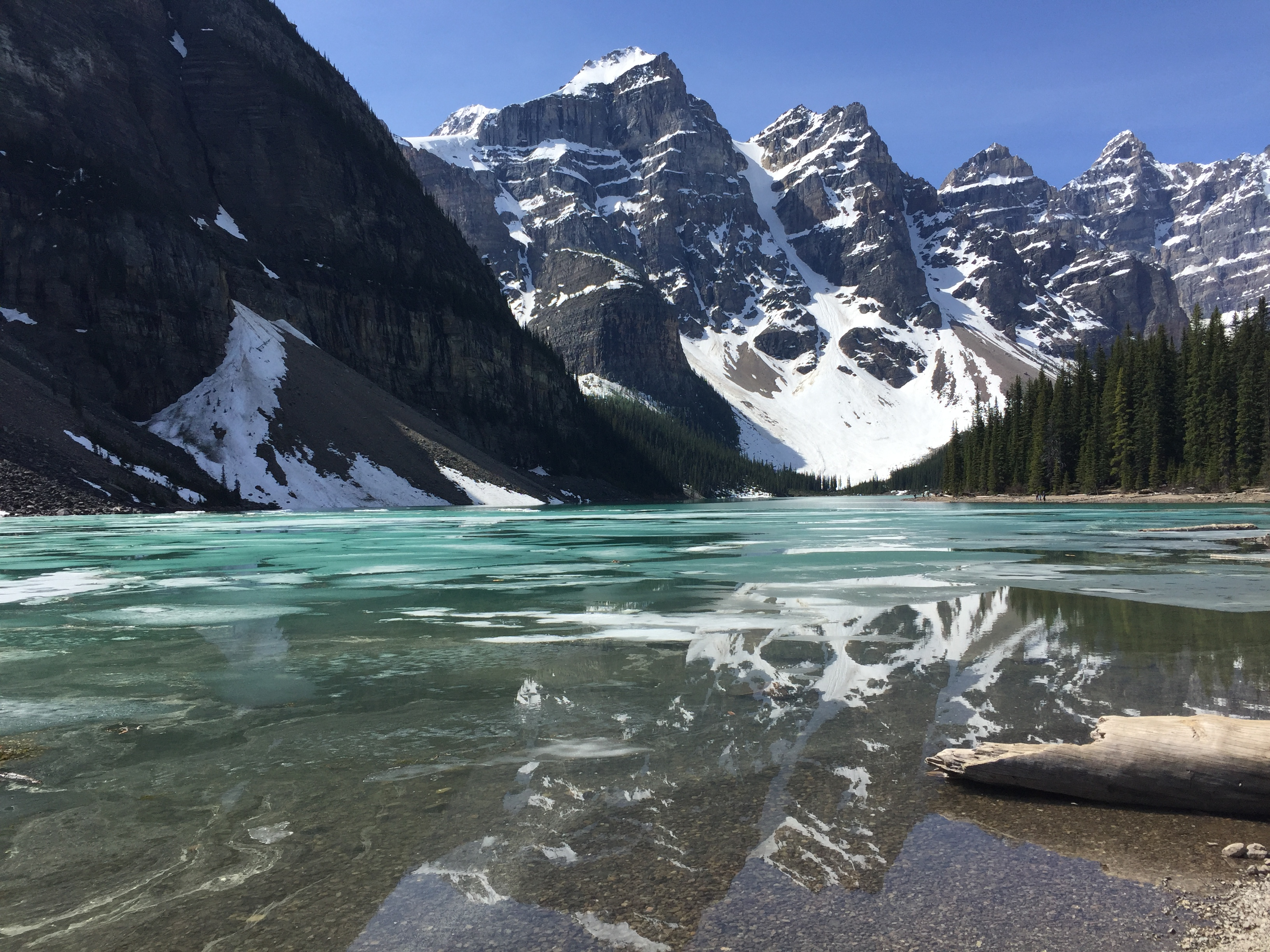
Mount Bowlen centered and reflected in Moraine Lake

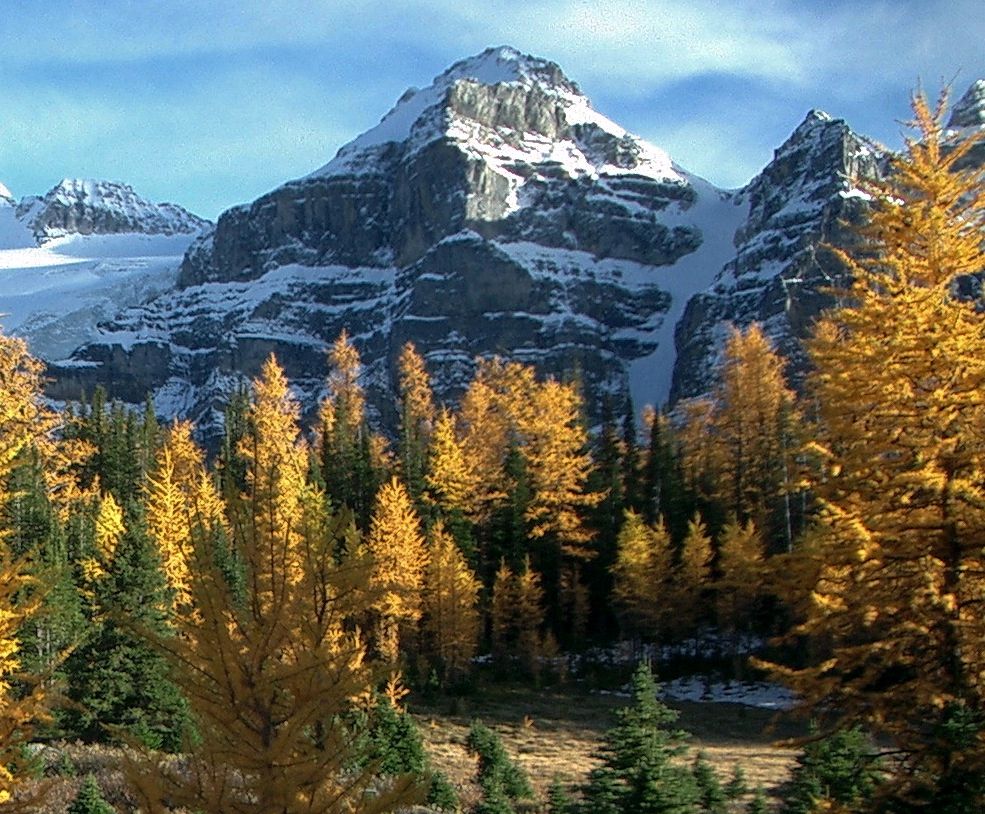
Mount Bowlen seen from Larch Valley

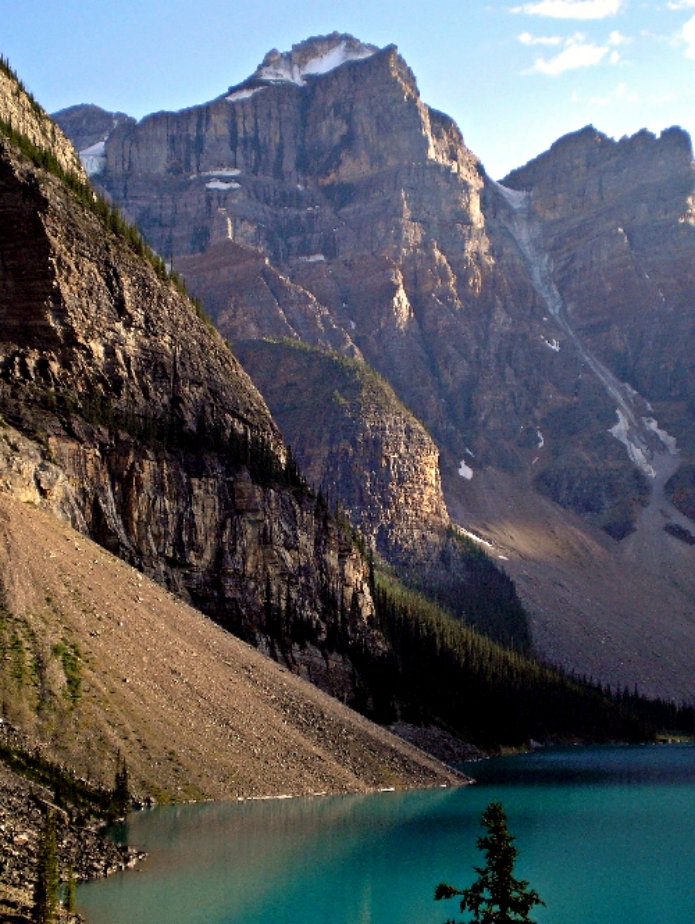

== See also ==
- List of peaks on the Alberta–British Columbia border
