= Moraine Lake =

Glacial lake in Alberta, Canada

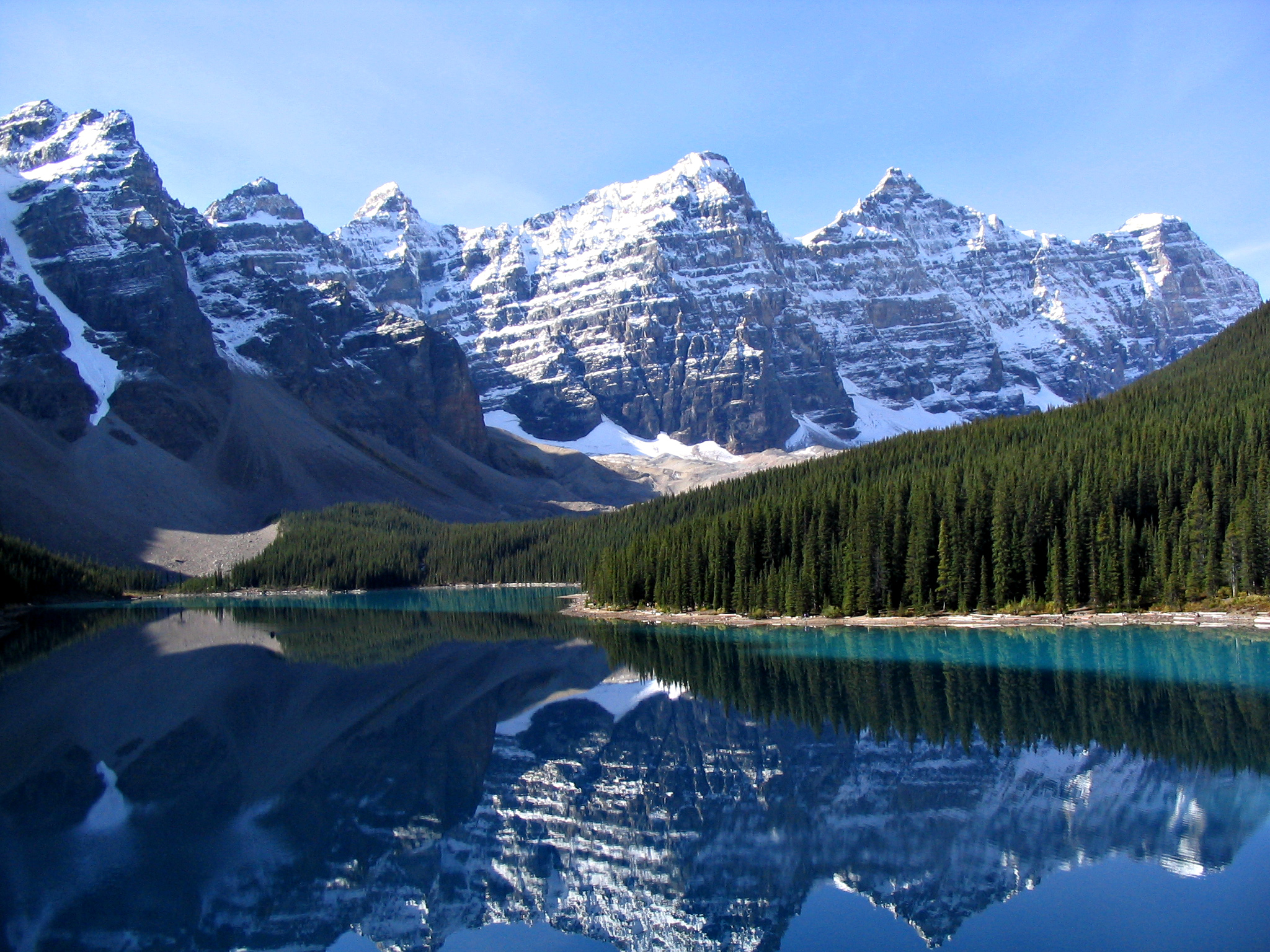

- Location within Alberta
- Location: Banff National Park, Alberta
- Coordinates: 51°19′21″N 116°11′08″W
- Primary inflows: Fay Glacier; Larch Creek
- Primary outflows: Moraine Creek
- Basin countries: Canada
- Surface area: 50 ha (0.19 sq mi)
- Max. depth: 14 metres (46 ft)
- Surface elevation: 1,884 m (6,181 ft)

Moraine Lake is a snow and glacially fed alpine lake in Banff National Park, 14 kilometres (8.7 mi) outside the village of Lake Louise, Alberta, Canada. It is situated in the Valley of the Ten Peaks, at an elevation of approximately 1,884 metres (6,181 ft). The lake has a surface area of 50 hectares (120 acres).

The lake, being fed almost completely by snow-melt and glacial-melt, does not reach its crest until middle to late June. When it is full, it reflects a distinctive shade of azure blue. The unique colour is due to the refraction of the blue end of the spectrum of sunlight off the rock sediment deposited in the lake on a continual basis in summer by the surrounding glaciers. The lake is completely created by nature and has not been dammed, drained, or otherwise altered by humans in any way, other than the visitor services which are strictly controlled by the National Park.

The road to Moraine Lake is only open during the summer months (June-Sep). Since 2023, Parks Canada has closed it to personal vehicles year-round with only Park shuttles, public transit and commercial operators allowed to access the road. Visitors can also bicycle or walk the road, which is 10 km / 6 miles long one-way.

The water from the lake, like other glacial lakes, is not potable without adequate treatment (both filtration and boiling). This is because the water contains silt and bacteria, despite its iconic pale blue appearance.

== Tourism ==
=== Hiking trails ===
The area around the lake has several walking/hiking trails that are, from time to time, restricted. The trail most commonly taken by tourists is The Rockpile Trail, which is along the actual moraine. The trail is approximately 300 metres (980 ft) long, with an elevation change of 24 metres (79 ft). The view of the lake from the top of the rockpile is one of the most photographed locations in all of Canada. That view of the mountains behind the lake in Valley of the Ten Peaks is known as the "Twenty Dollar View", as Moraine Lake was featured on the reverse side of the 1969 and 1979 issues of the Canadian twenty dollar bill; see Scenes of Canada § $20 note. The area often experiences congestion due to the high level of tourism.

Along the same trail-head, the Consolation Lakes trail starts, which is approximately 3 kilometres long, with an elevation change of 90 metres (300 ft). Upon reaching Consolation Lakes hikers may continue along to the upper lake, which is not visible from the end of the lower lake. There is, however, no clearly marked trail, and can often be a scramble over large rocky areas.

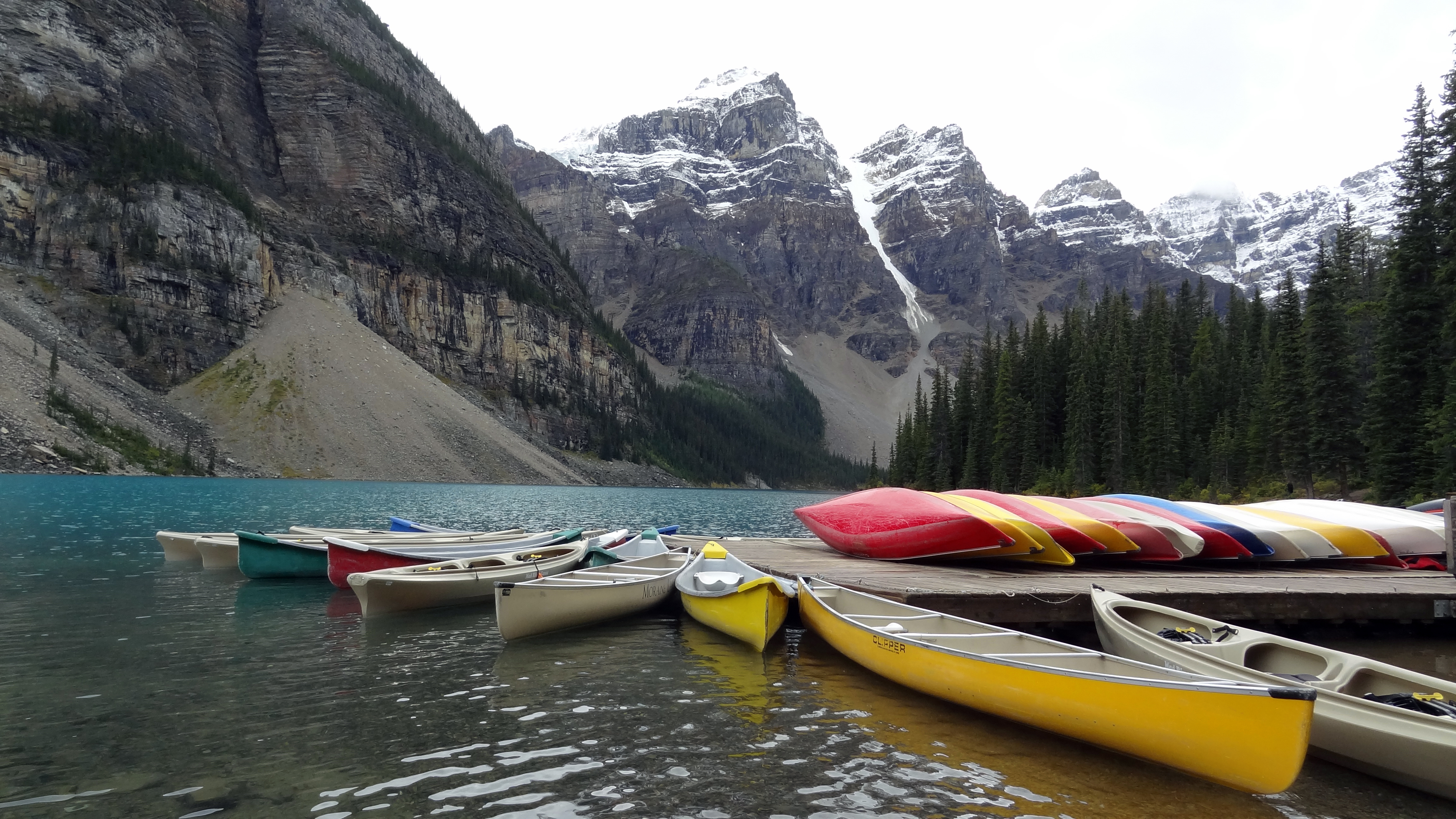
Canoe docks

Near the canoe docks of Moraine Lake Lodge there is another trailhead. This trail-head is the start of two trails, one of which branches out into four different trails - so there are in total, five trails starting at that trail-head (Moraine Lake Lakeshore Trail, Eiffel Lake, Wenkchemna Pass, Larch Valley, and Sentinel Pass). The Lake Louise & Yoho Map provides information on these trails.

=== Mountaineering routes ===
The Neil Colgan Hut can be reached in 8 to 12 hours climbing the Perren Route from Moraine Lake.

=== Road access ===
In 2023, Parks Canada announced that personal vehicles would no longer be allowed on the road year-round. Visitors would need to use the Parks Canada Shuttle, public transportation, or a private operator to access the lake. People with disabilities are exempt if they have a permit, and the road is also still accessible by bike and foot. The agency said that the move was necessary because parking could not accommodate the surging traffic, with only a "very small percentage" of cars being allowed on the road in 2022 and the rest having to be turned away. It also noted how having to turn away so many vehicles was creating a safety hazard, with staff being confronted and harassed by disgruntled visitors.

== Appearances ==
The image of Moraine Lake is world-famous and appears in many places, including:

- On the reverse side of the 1969 and 1979 issues of the Canadian twenty dollar bill.
- In one of the main preview pictures for Google's operating system Android, Moraine lake was used as a background picture.

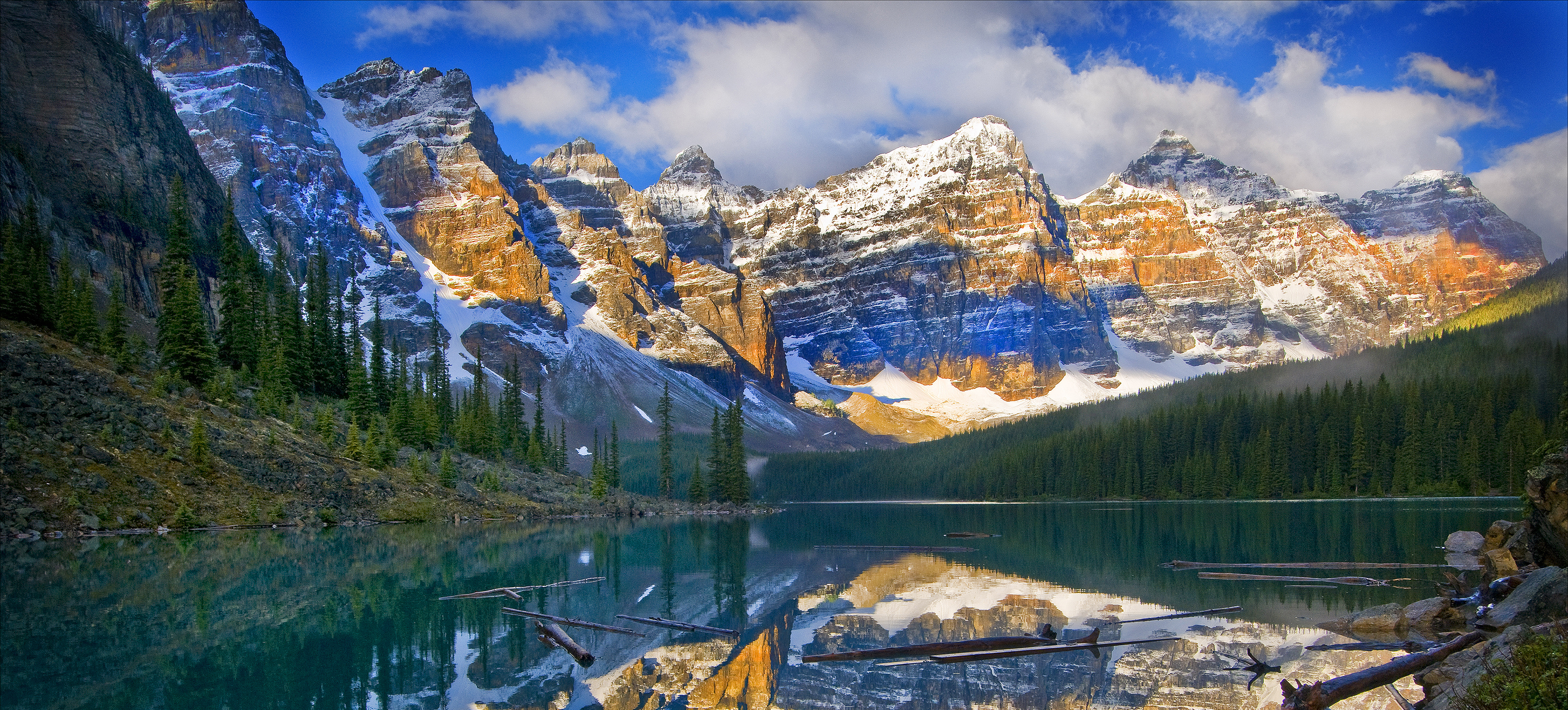
Moraine Lake at Sunset

- In one of the backgrounds available on the BlackBerry Pearl.
- In one of the backgrounds available on the Palm Pre.
- In one of Windows Vista Starter wallpapers.
- In one of the themes available on Google Chrome.

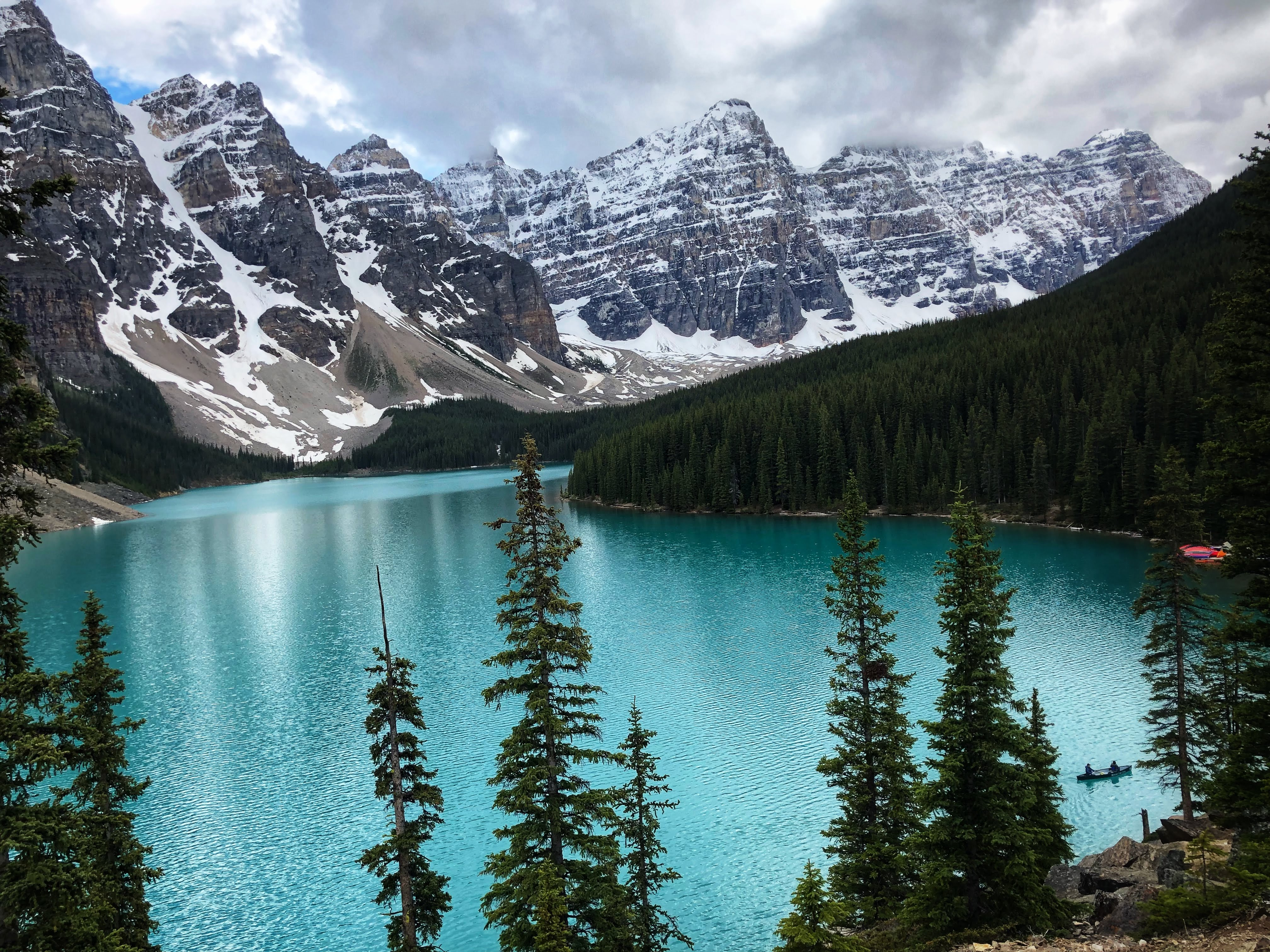
Moraine Lake in June 2018

- In one of Windows 7's backgrounds in the "Canada" series.
- As the Bing homepage on October 13, 2009, on October 2, 2013, and again on September 10, 2014.
- As the National Geographic Travel 365: Photo of the Day for October 8, 2013.
- As a photo in Joel's Texas home in the video game The Last of Us.
- On a postcard in the video game Until Dawn (the card however says Calgary).
- In the login screen of Windows 10.
- As a colour image, which was reproduced from photo taken by photographer Peter McKinnon, on one of Royal Canadian Mint 2 oz. silver coins.
- As a trout and perch fishery in the 2018 video game Ultimate Fishing Simulator.
- As the subject of the 2021 Springbok jigsaw puzzle "Calm Canoes."

== Image gallery ==
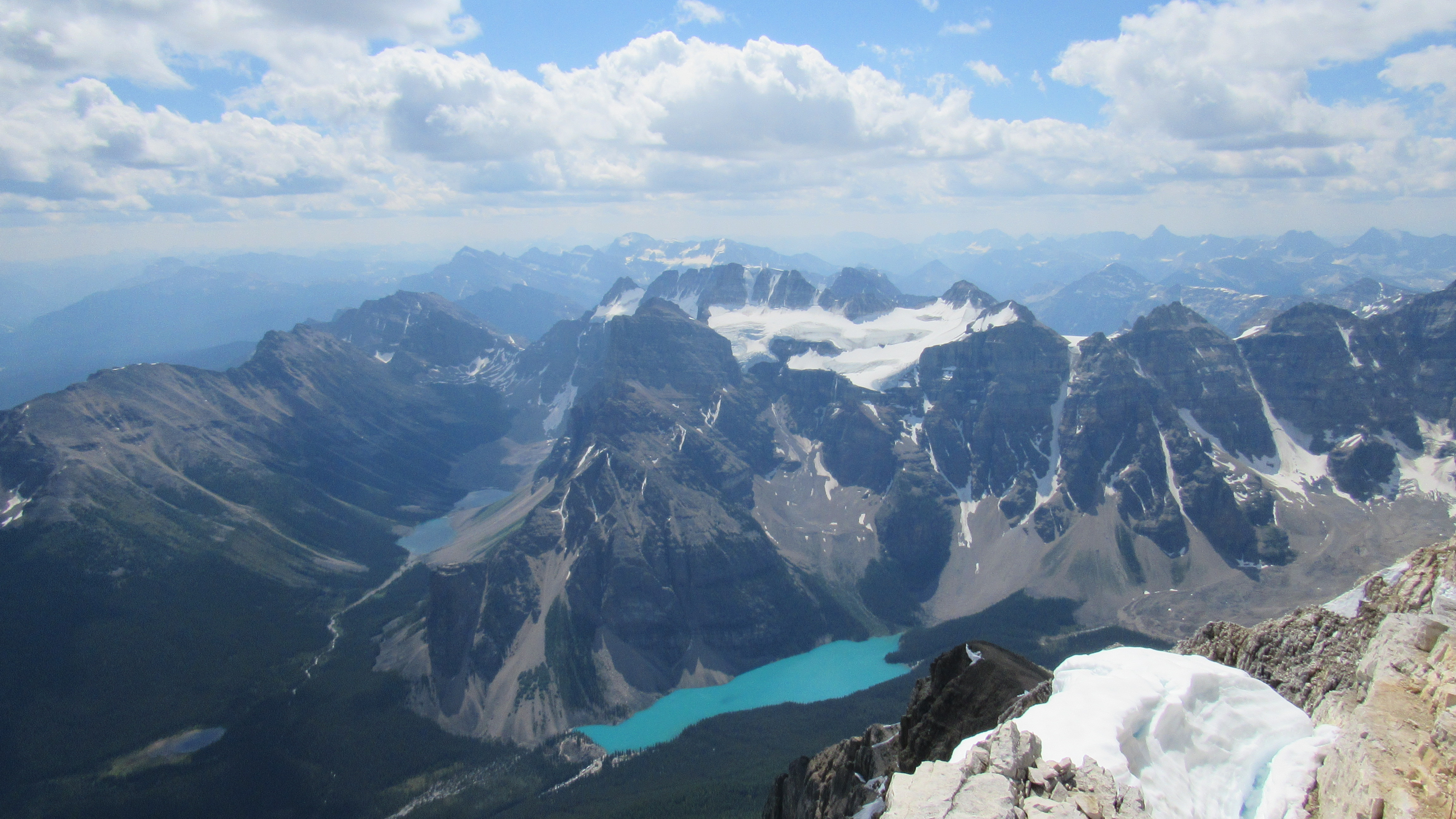
Moraine Lake seen from Mount Temple Summit

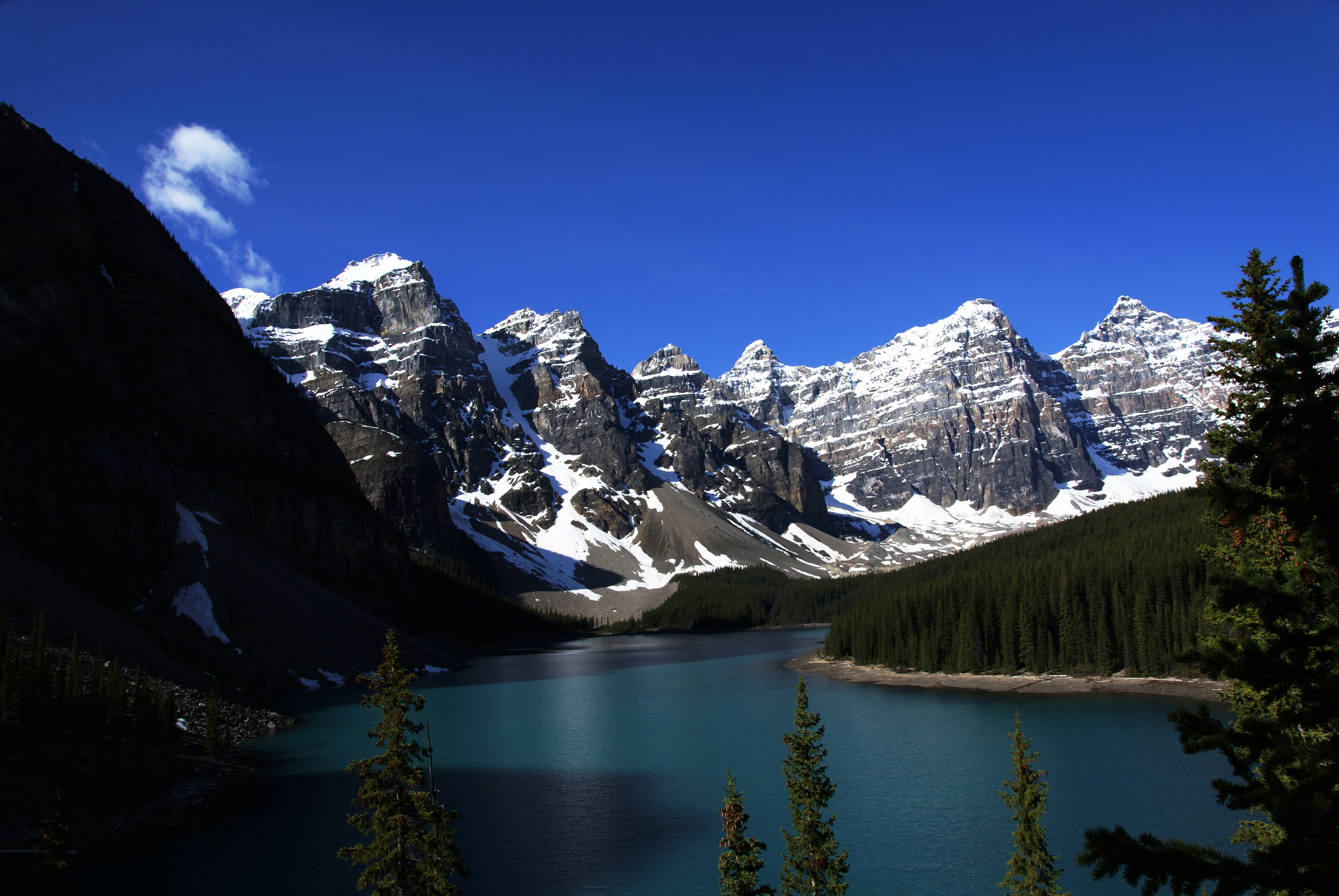
Moraine Lake from the Rockpile

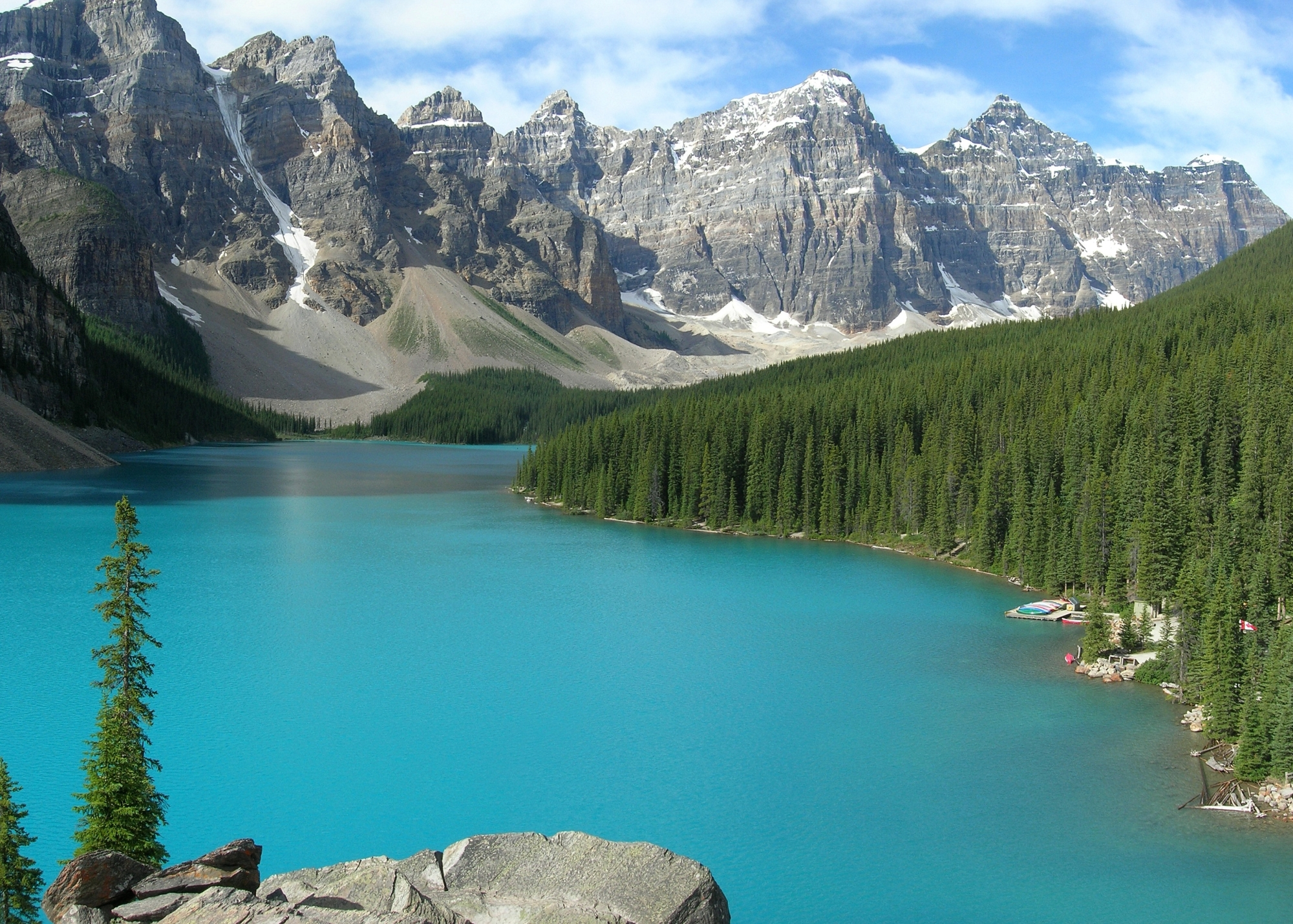
The blue-green colour of the lake is due to glacial rock flour.

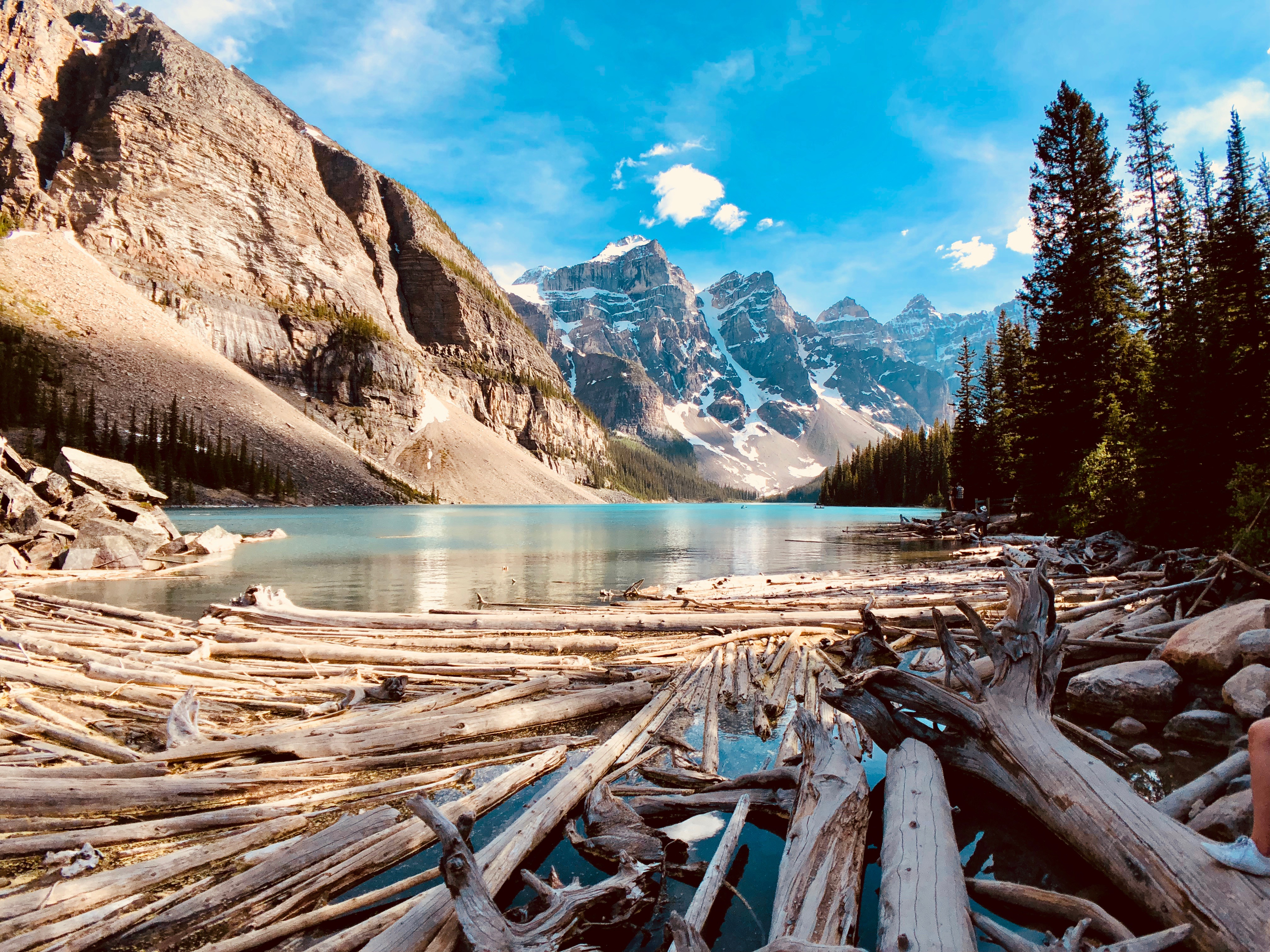
Moraine Lake in Banff National Park with floating timber

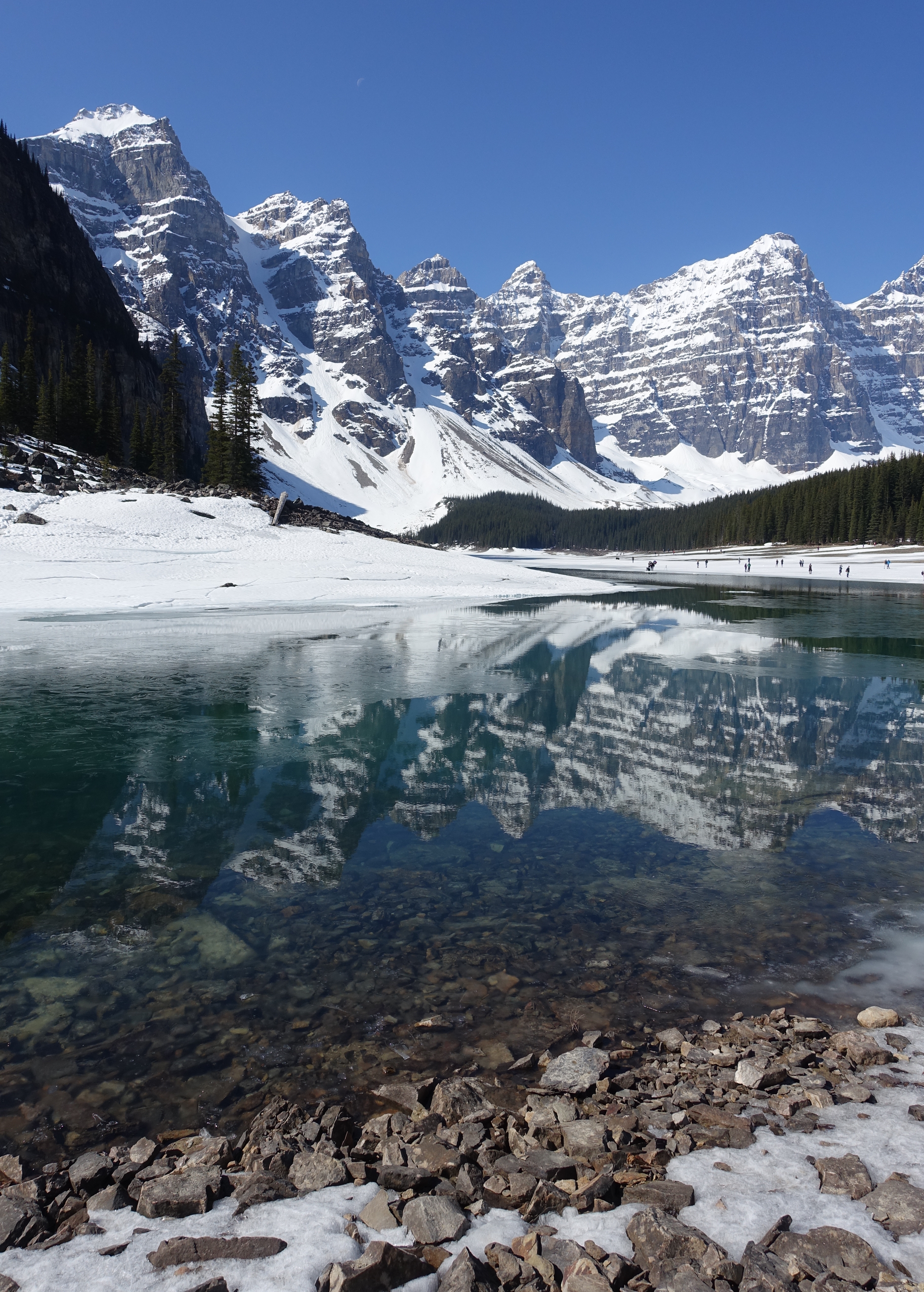
Moraine Lake is still mostly frozen in May and a considerable amount of snow is still in the area and the surrounding mountains.

== See also ==
- List of lakes
- Natural environment
- Nature
