= Haddo (disambiguation) =

Haddo is another name for pink salmon. It may also refer to:

- USS Haddo, two US Navy submarines
- Haddo, a community in South Dundas, Ontario, Canada
- Haddo Peak, Alberta, Canada
- Earl of Haddo, a subsidiary title of the Marquess of Aberdeen and Temair
- Oliver Haddo, a character (a caricature of Aleister Crowley) in the 1908 novel The Magician by W. Somerset Maugham
- Oliver Haddo, a pen name used by Aleister Crowley for a critique of the novel, as well as other writings

== See also ==
- Haddo House, a Scottish stately home near Tarves in Aberdeenshire
