= Mount Wilcox =

Mount Wilcox may refer to:

- Mount Wilcox (Alberta), Canada
- Mount Wilcox (Antarctica)
