= Mount Fairview =

Mount Fairview can refer to:

- Fairview Mountain (Alberta), Canada
- Mount Fairview (Colorado) in Custer County, Colorado
