= Mount Metcalfe =

Mountain in Graham Land, Antarctica

Mount Metcalfe (67°59′S 66°57′W) is a mountain at the south side of the head of McMorrin Glacier, 1.5 nautical miles (3 km) south of Mount Wilcox, in Graham Land, Antarctica. It was named by the UK Antarctic Place-Names Committee for Robert John Metcalfe, a British Antarctic Survey surveyor at Stonington Island, 1960–62, who surveyed the area in 1962.
