= McMorrin =

McMorrin may refer to:

- Anna McMorrin (born 1971), Welsh Labour Party politician
- McMorrin Glacier, glacier in Antarctica
