= Little Temple =

Mountain in Banff NP, Alberta, Canada

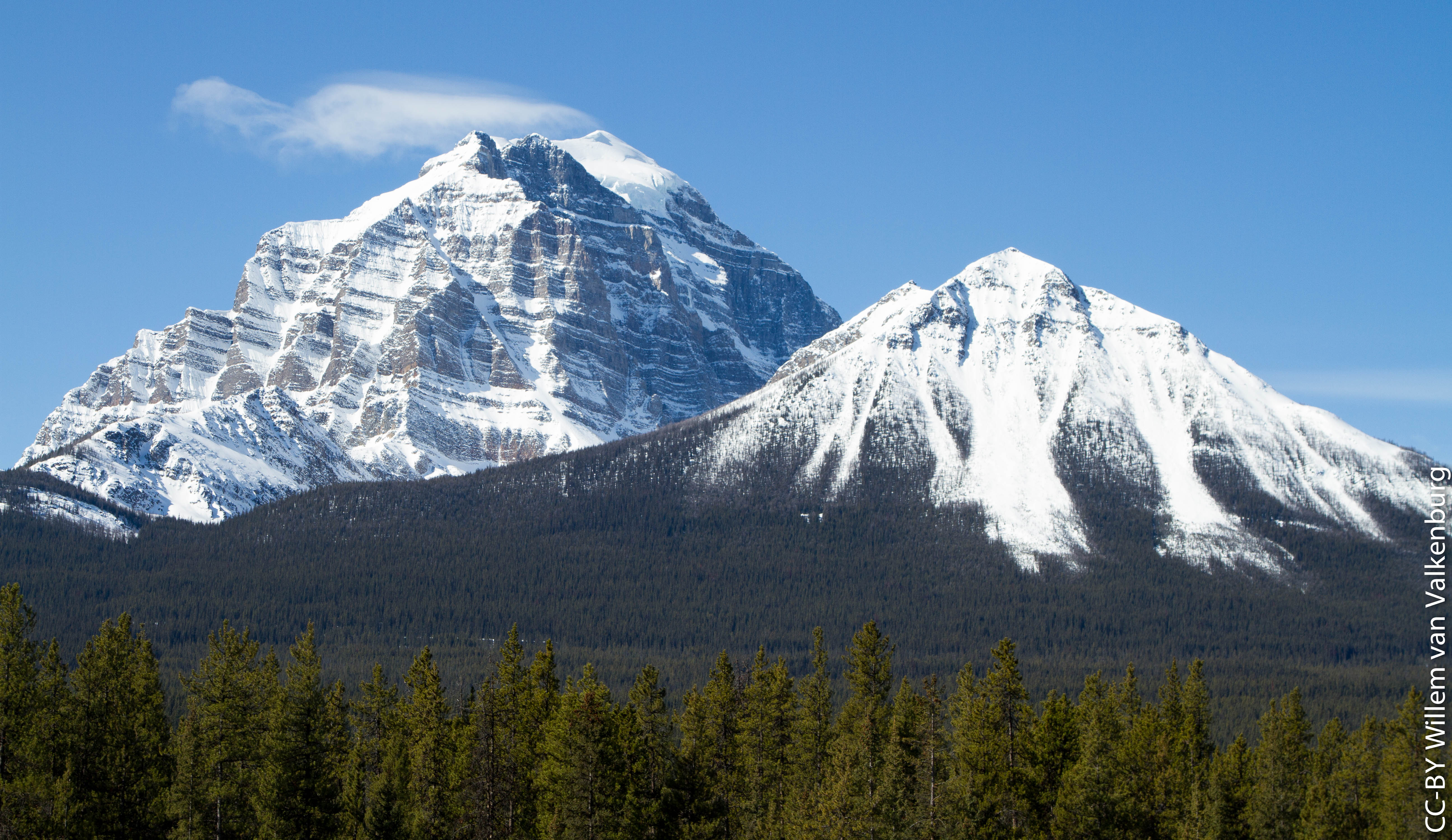
- Little Temple (right) seen with Mount Temple

Highest point
- Elevation: 2,653 m (8,704 ft)
- Prominence: 233 m (764 ft)
- Listing: Mountains of Alberta
- Coordinates: 51°22′12″N 116°11′12″W

Geography
- Location within Alberta Location within Canada
- Interactive map of Little Temple
- Location: Banff National Park; Alberta, Canada
- Parent range: Bow Range; Canadian Rockies
- Topo map: NTS 82N8 Lake Louise

Climbing
- Easiest route: Scramble

Little Temple is a 2,653-metre (8,704-foot) mountain summit located in Banff National Park of the Canadian Rockies of Alberta, Canada. Little Temple is situated in the Bow River Valley between Paradise Creek and Moraine Creek, 6.0 km (3.7 mi) south of Lake Louise, Alberta. The mountain can be seen from the Icefields Parkway along with its nearest higher peak, Mount Temple, 1.07 km (0.66 mi) to the southwest.

== Geology ==
Like other mountains in Banff Park, Little Temple is composed of sedimentary rock laid down during the Precambrian to Jurassic periods. Formed in shallow seas, this sedimentary rock was pushed east and over the top of younger rock during the Laramide orogeny.

== Climate ==
Based on the Köppen climate classification, Little Temple is located in a subarctic climate with cold, snowy winters, and mild summers. Temperatures can drop below -20 °C with wind chill factors below -30 °C. Precipitation runoff from Little Temple drains into the Bow River which is a tributary of the Saskatchewan River.

== Gallery ==
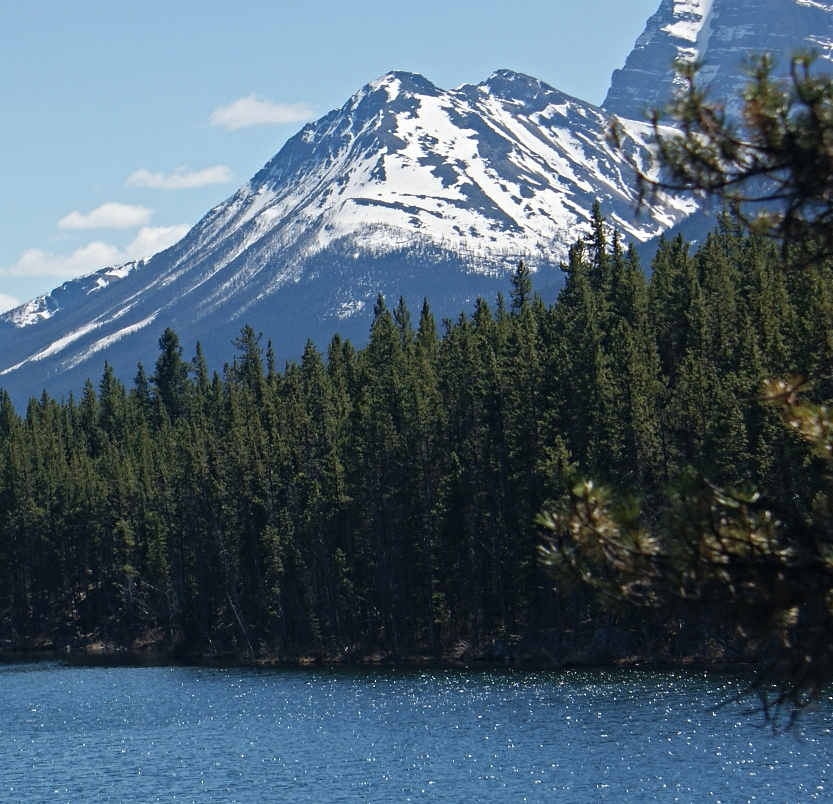
Little Temple from Herbert Lake

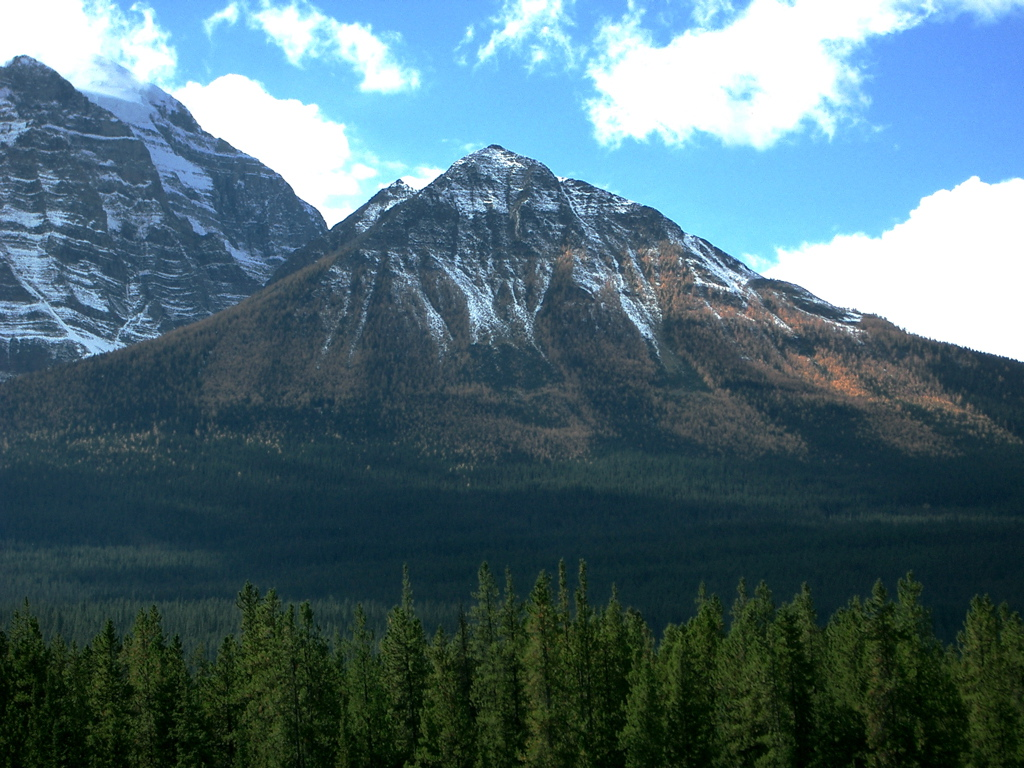
Little Temple

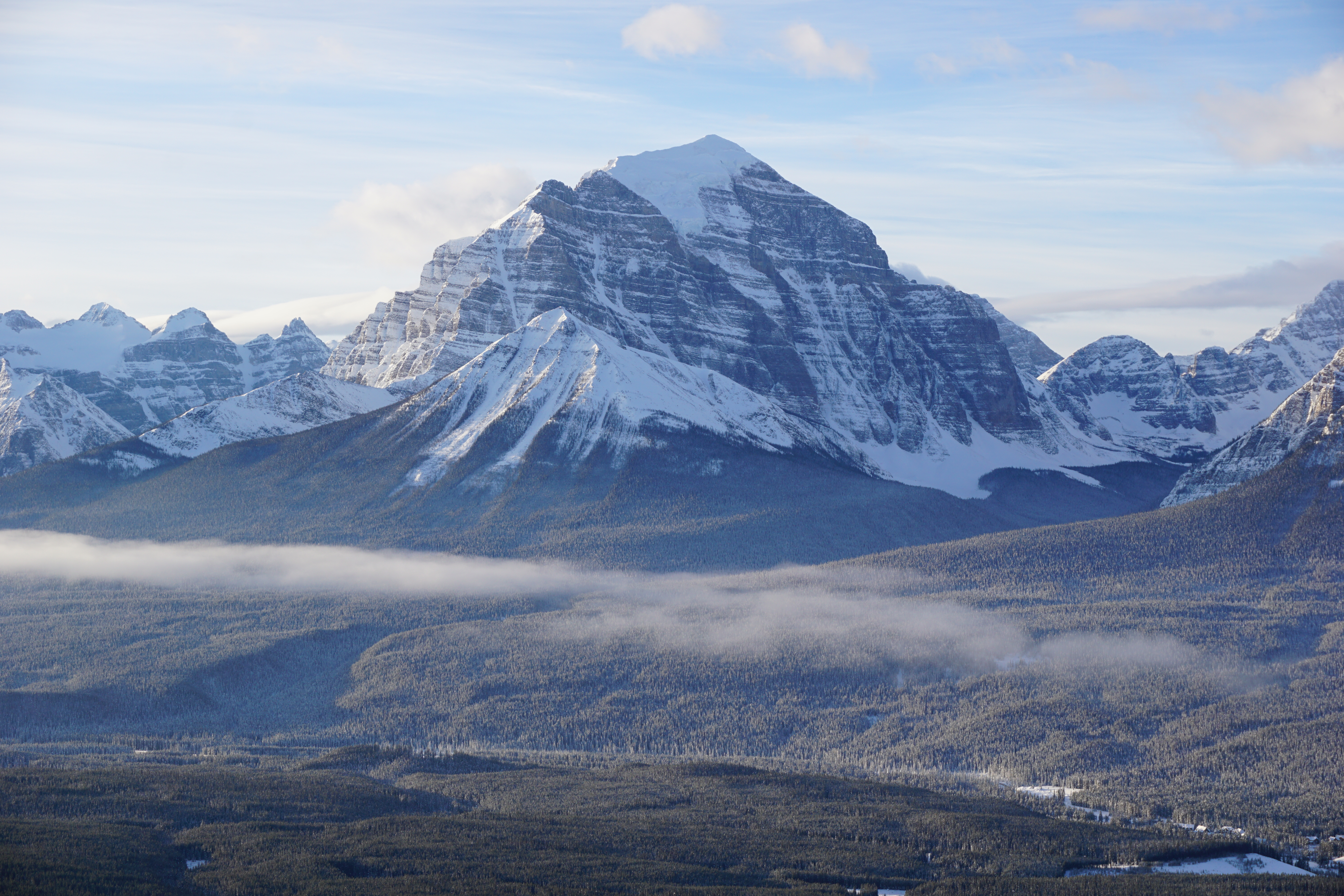
Little Temple in front of Mount Temple

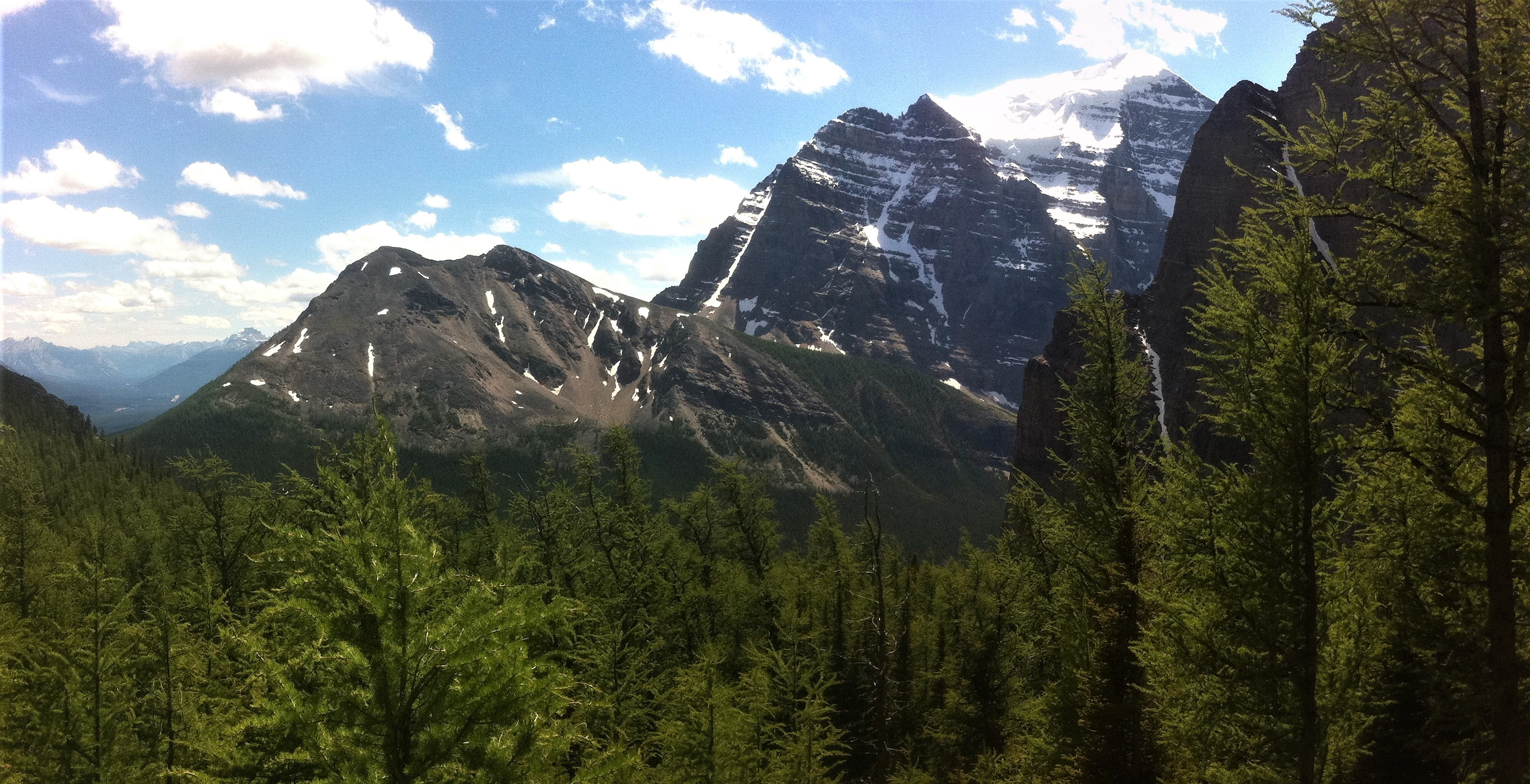
North aspect of Little Temple (left) and Mount Temple

== See also ==
- Mountain peaks of Canada
- Geography of Alberta
