= Fairview Mountain (Alberta) =

Mountain in Banff National Park, Alberta, Canada

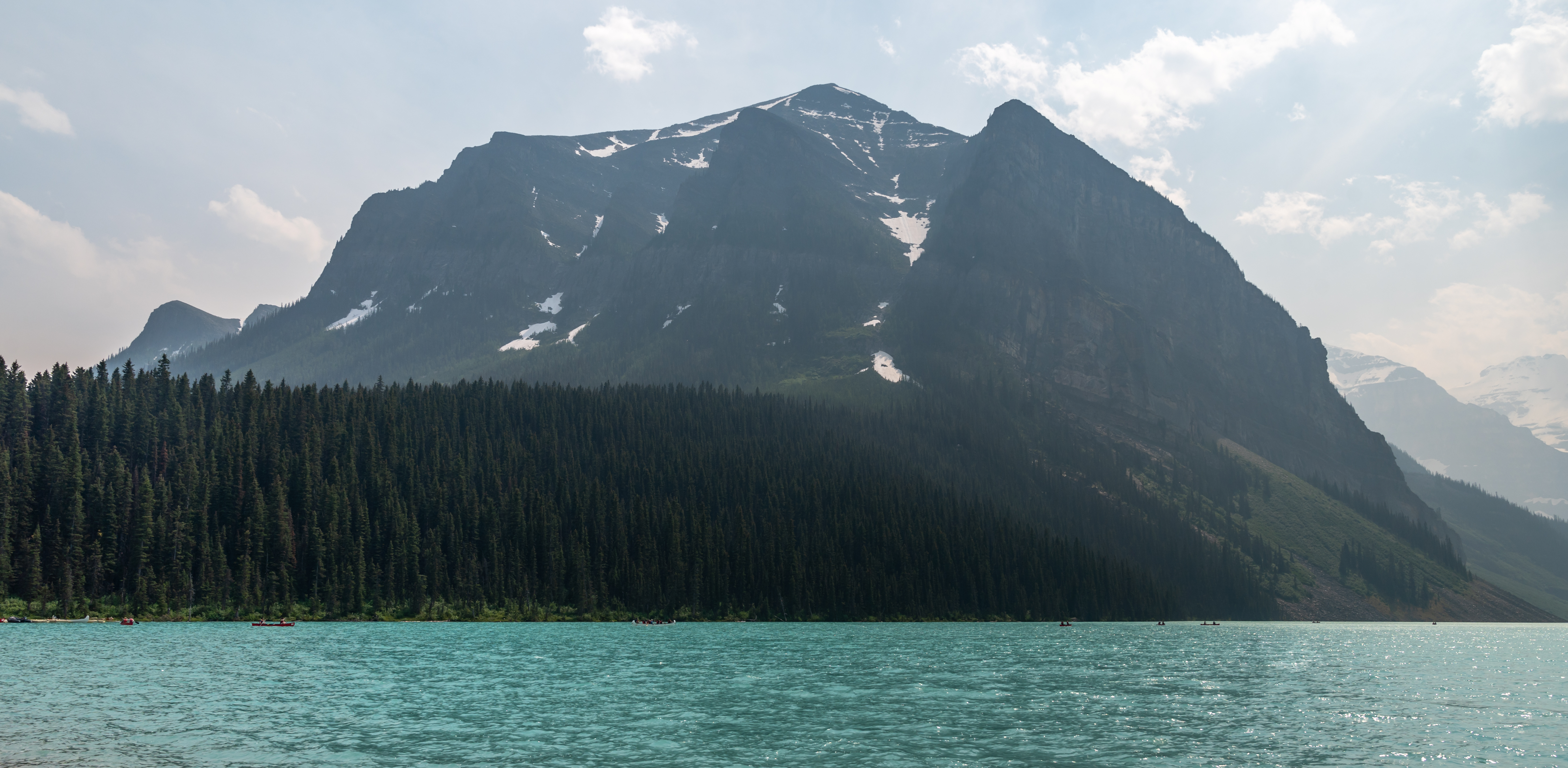
- Fairview Mountain from the shoreline of Lake Louise

Highest point
- Elevation: 2,744 m (9,003 ft)
- Prominence: 275 m (902 ft)
- Parent peak: Mount Aberdeen (3152 m)
- Listing: Mountains of Alberta
- Coordinates: 51°23′58″N 116°13′24″W

Geography
- Location within Alberta Location within Canada
- Interactive map of Fairview Mountain
- Country: Canada
- Province: Alberta
- Protected area: Banff National Park
- Parent range: Bow Range (Canadian Rockies)
- Topo map: NTS 82N8 Lake Louise

Climbing
- First ascent: 1893 by Walter Wilcox and Samuel Allen (first recorded)
- Easiest route: Easy scramble

Fairview Mountain (sometimes called Mount Fairview) is a mountain in Banff National Park situated along the southeastern shoreline of Lake Louise. The mountain was named in 1894 by Walter Wilcox, which reflects the view from the top. An alternate name for the peak is Goat Mountain although it is rarely referred to as such.

While imposing cliffs seen from Lake Louise may indicate a difficult climb, the mountain is easily ascended by experienced hikers via a trail around the backside on the southern slopes of the mountain.

== Geology ==
Fairview Mountain is composed of sedimentary rock laid down during the Cambrian period. Formed in shallow seas, this sedimentary rock was pushed east and over the top of younger rock during the Laramide orogeny.

== Climate ==
Based on the Köppen climate classification, Fairview is located in a subarctic climate zone with cold, snowy winters, and mild summers. Winter temperatures can drop below −20 °C with wind chill factors below −30 °C.

== Gallery ==
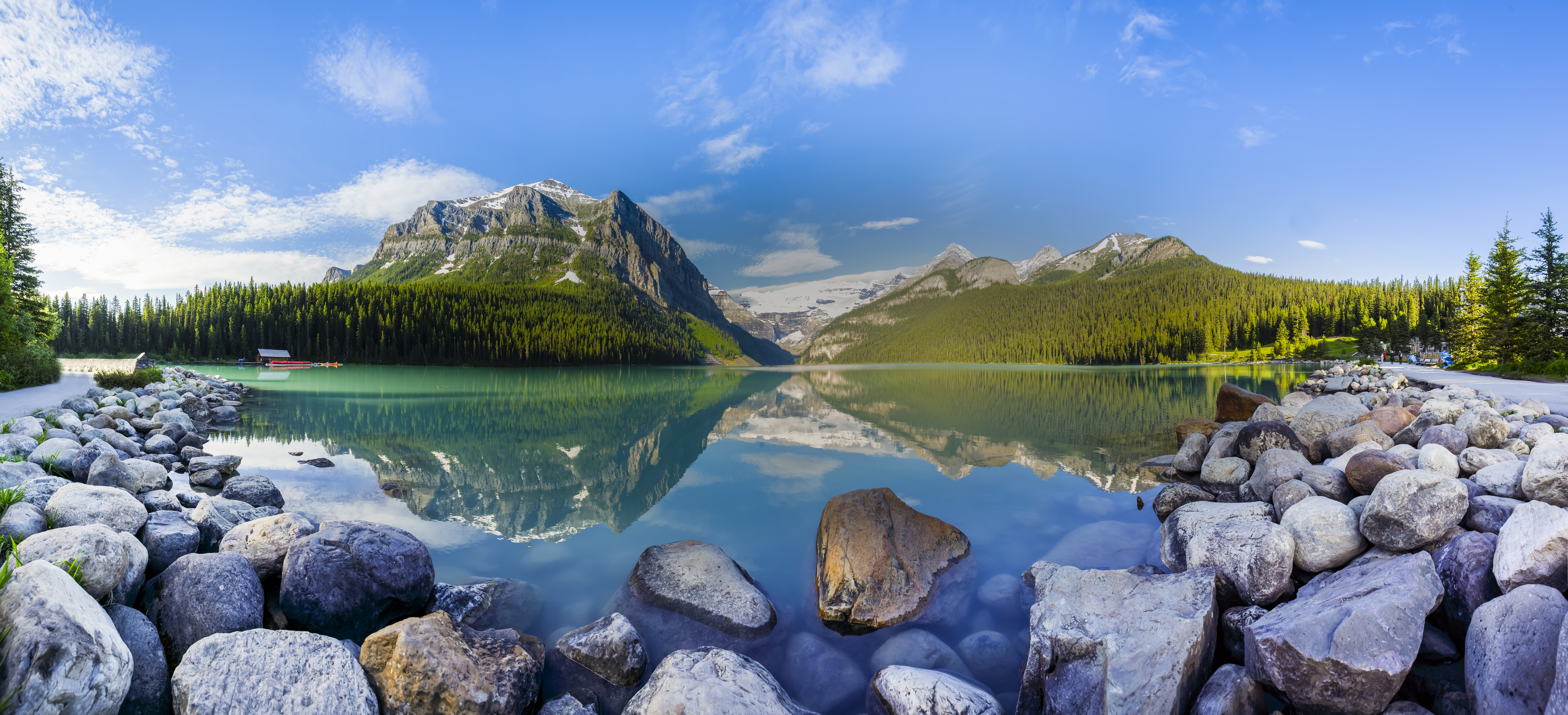
Fairview Mountain (left) reflected in Lake Louise

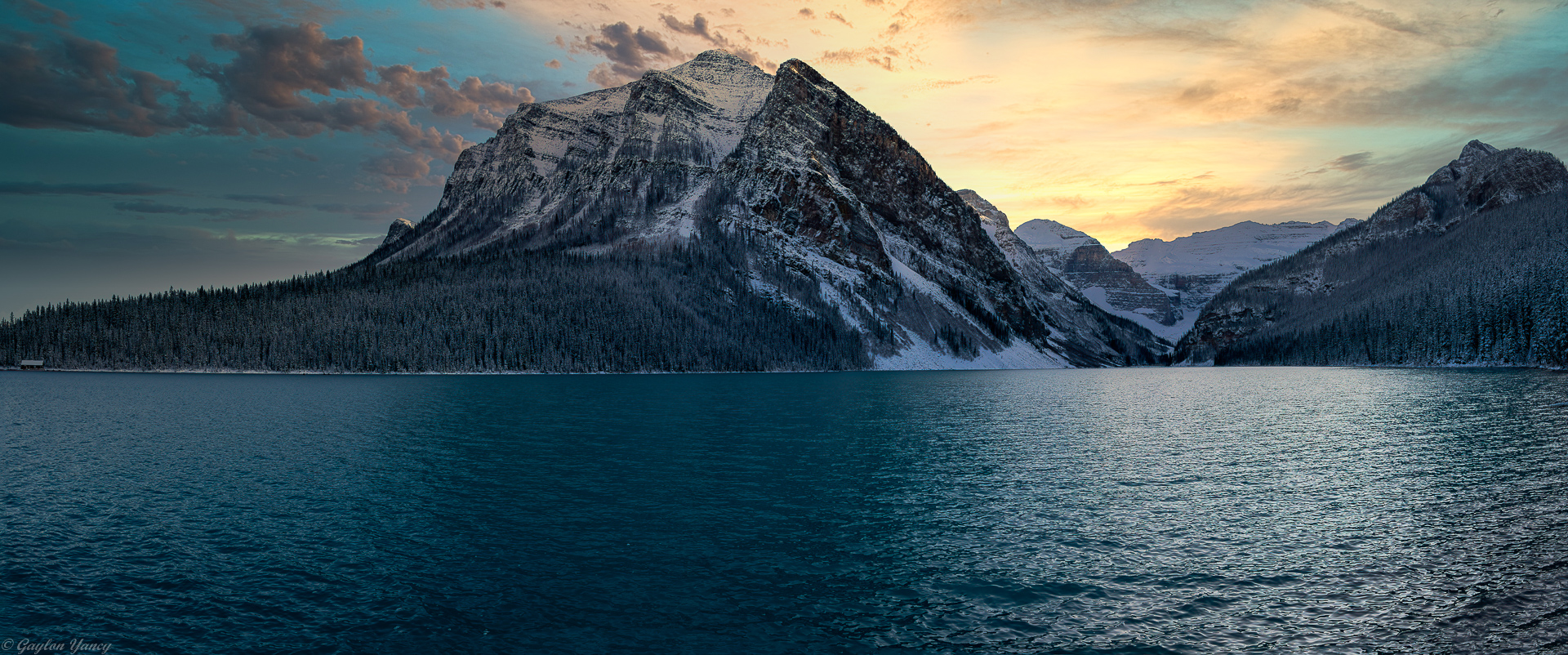

Lake Louise from Fairview Mtn

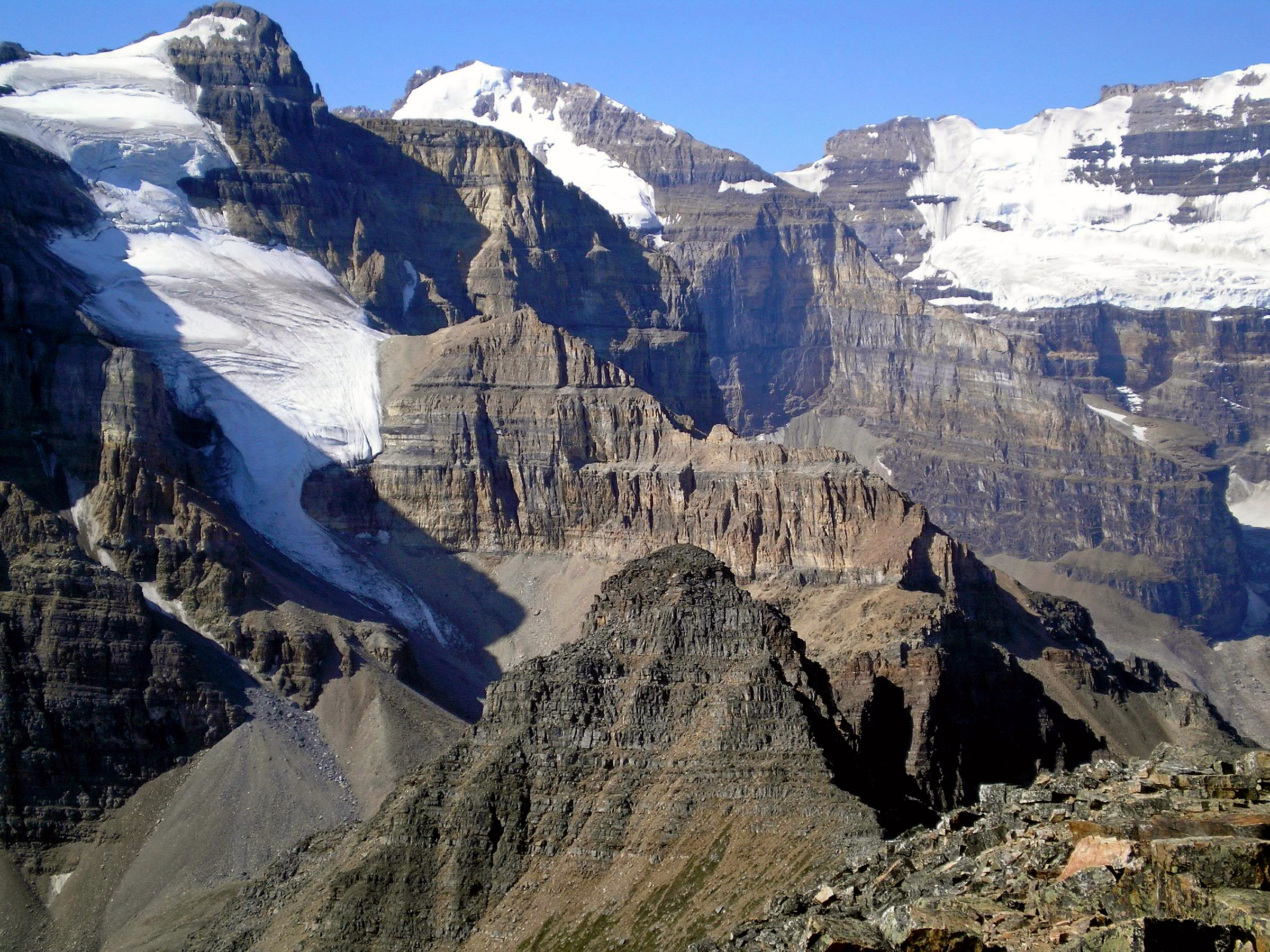
View from Fairview's summit

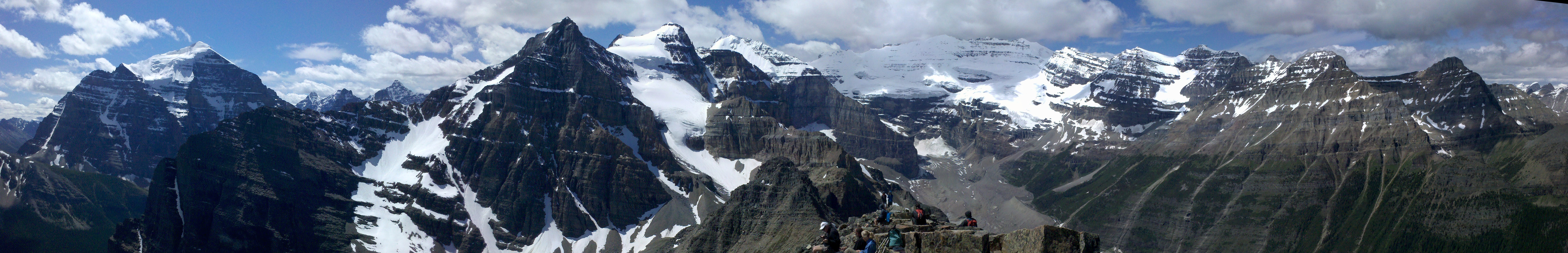
View from Fairview's summit

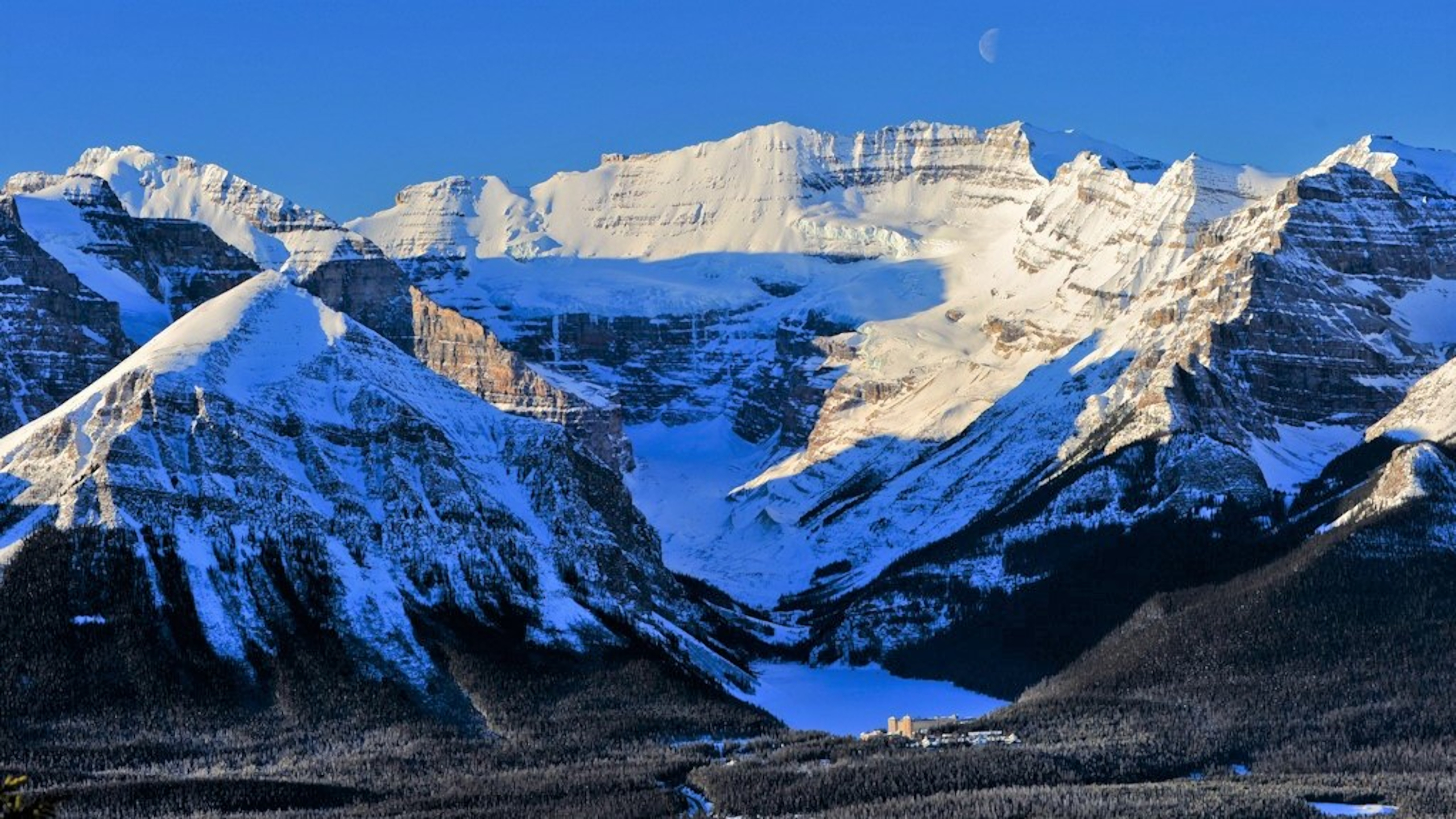
Fairview in lower left

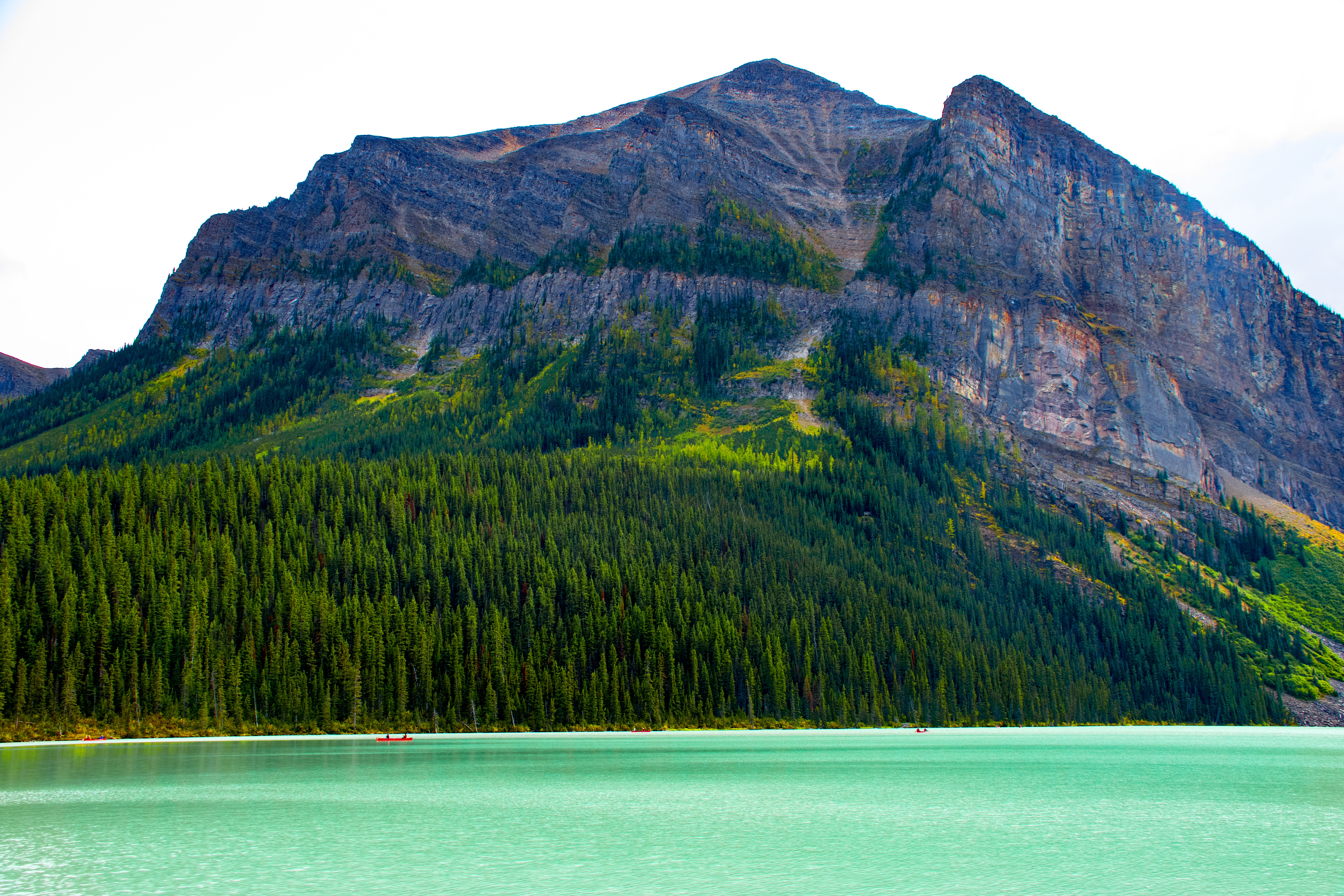

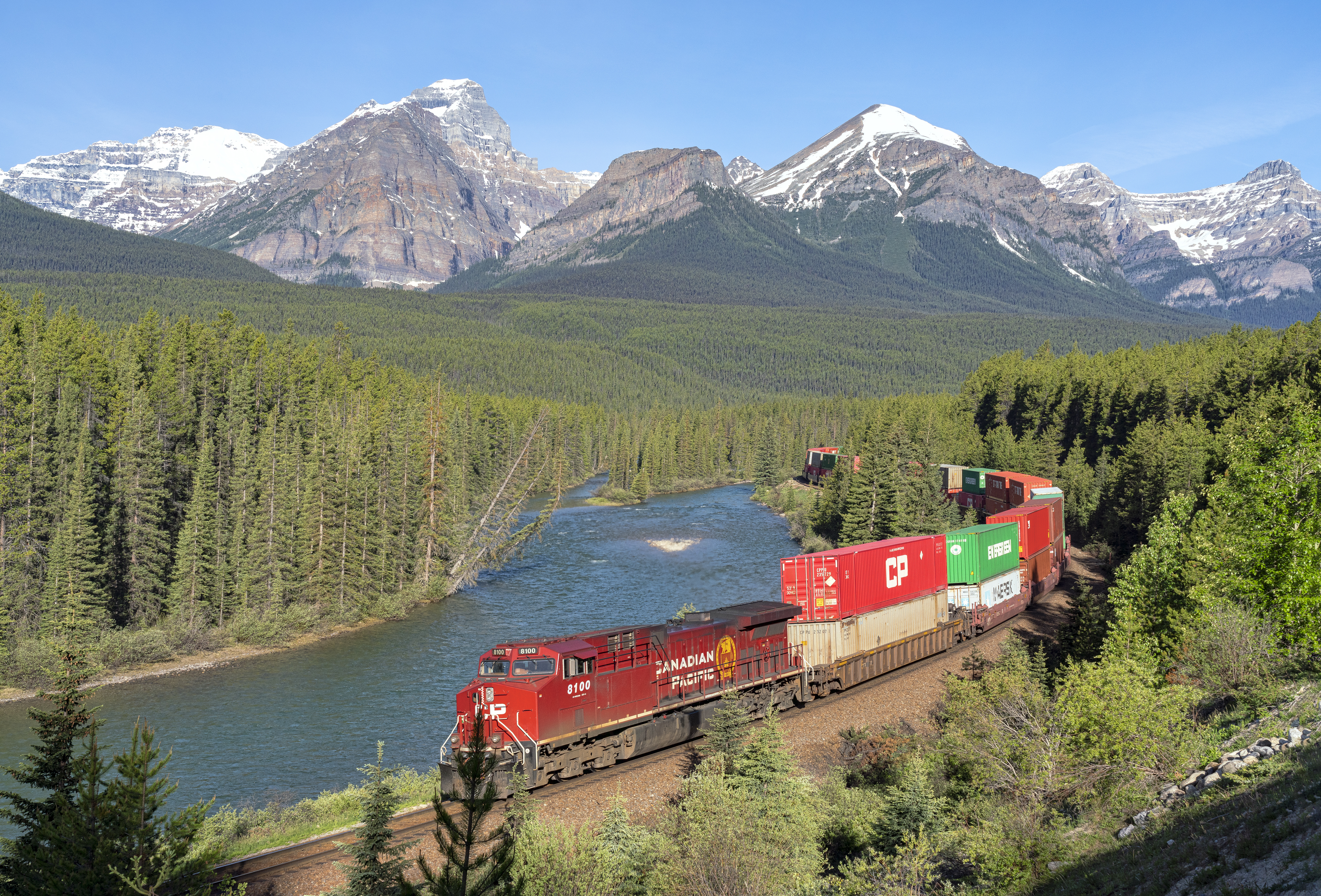
Morant's Curve in Banff National Park
L→R Lefroy, Haddo, Saddle Mountain, Fairview, Whyte, Niblock

== See also ==
- Media related to Fairview Mountain at Wikimedia Commons
