= Haddo Peak =

Mountain peak in Banff NP, Canada

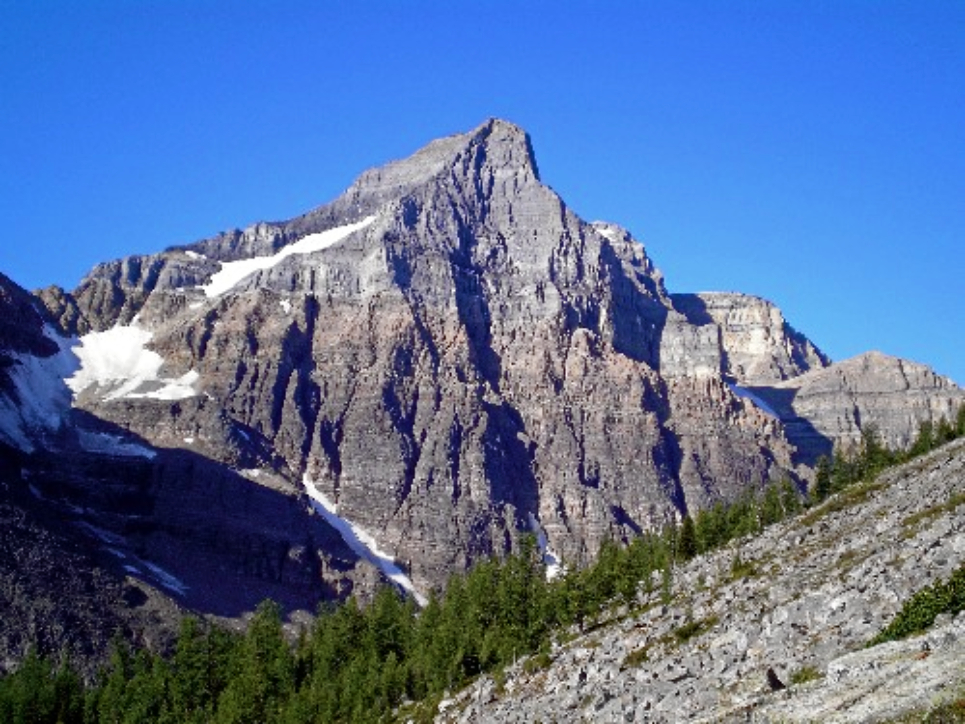
- Haddo Peak

Highest point
- Elevation: 3,070 m (10,070 ft)
- Prominence: 83 m (272 ft)
- Parent peak: Mount Aberdeen (3152 m)
- Listing: Mountains of Alberta
- Coordinates: 51°23′00″N 116°14′12″W

Geography
- Location within Alberta Location within Canada
- Country: Canada
- Province: Alberta
- Protected area: Banff National Park
- Parent range: Bow Range; Canadian Rockies
- Topo map: NTS 82N8 Lake Louise

Geology
- Rock type: Sedimentary

Climbing
- First ascent: 1903 by E. Tewes, C. Bohren
- Easiest route: Technical climb via Southwest Ridge

Haddo Peak is a summit in Alberta, Canada. Haddo Peak is located in the Lake Louise area of Banff National Park.

Haddo Peak honors the name of George Gordon, Lord Haddo. Named in 1916, the name became official in 1952.

== Geology ==
Like other mountains in Banff Park, Haddo Peak is composed of sedimentary rock laid down from the Precambrian to Jurassic periods. Formed in shallow seas, this sedimentary rock was pushed east and over the top of younger rock during the Laramide orogeny.

== Climate ==
Based on the Köppen climate classification, Haddo Peak is located in a subarctic climate zone with cold, snowy winters, and mild summers. Winter temperatures can drop below −20 °C (−4 °F) with wind chill factors below −30 °C (−22 °F). Weather conditions during summer months are optimum for climbing.

== See also ==
- List of mountains in the Canadian Rockies
- Geology of Alberta

== Gallery ==
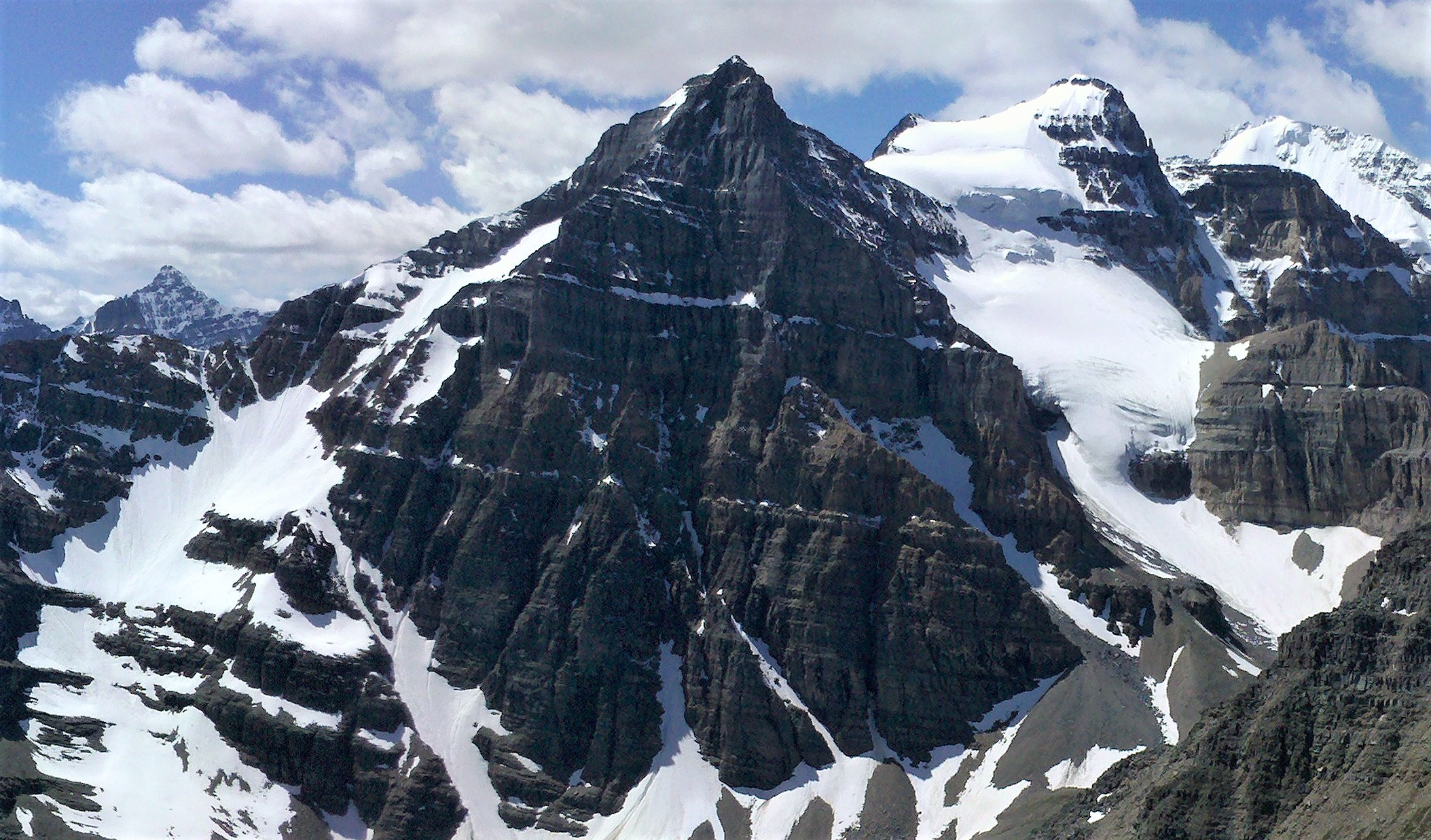
Haddo Peak (centered) seen from summit of Fairview Mountain. Mt. Aberdeen and Mt. Lefroy to right.

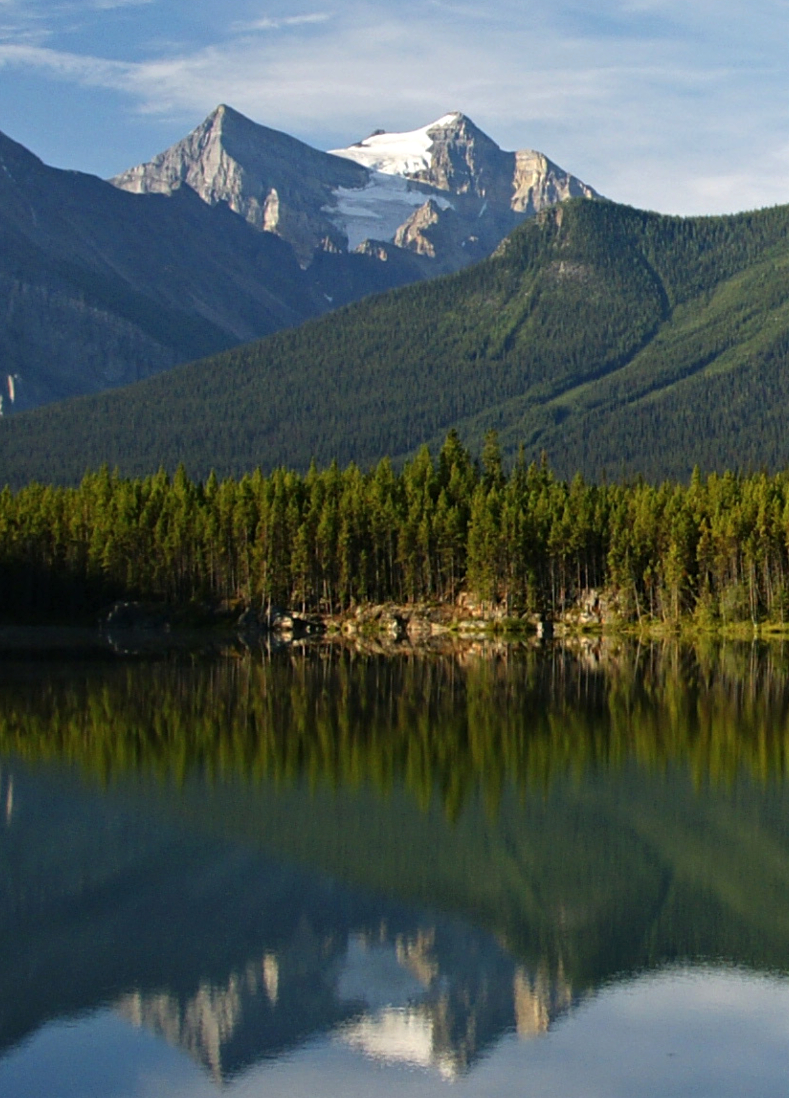
Haddo and Mount Aberdeen reflected in Lake Herbert

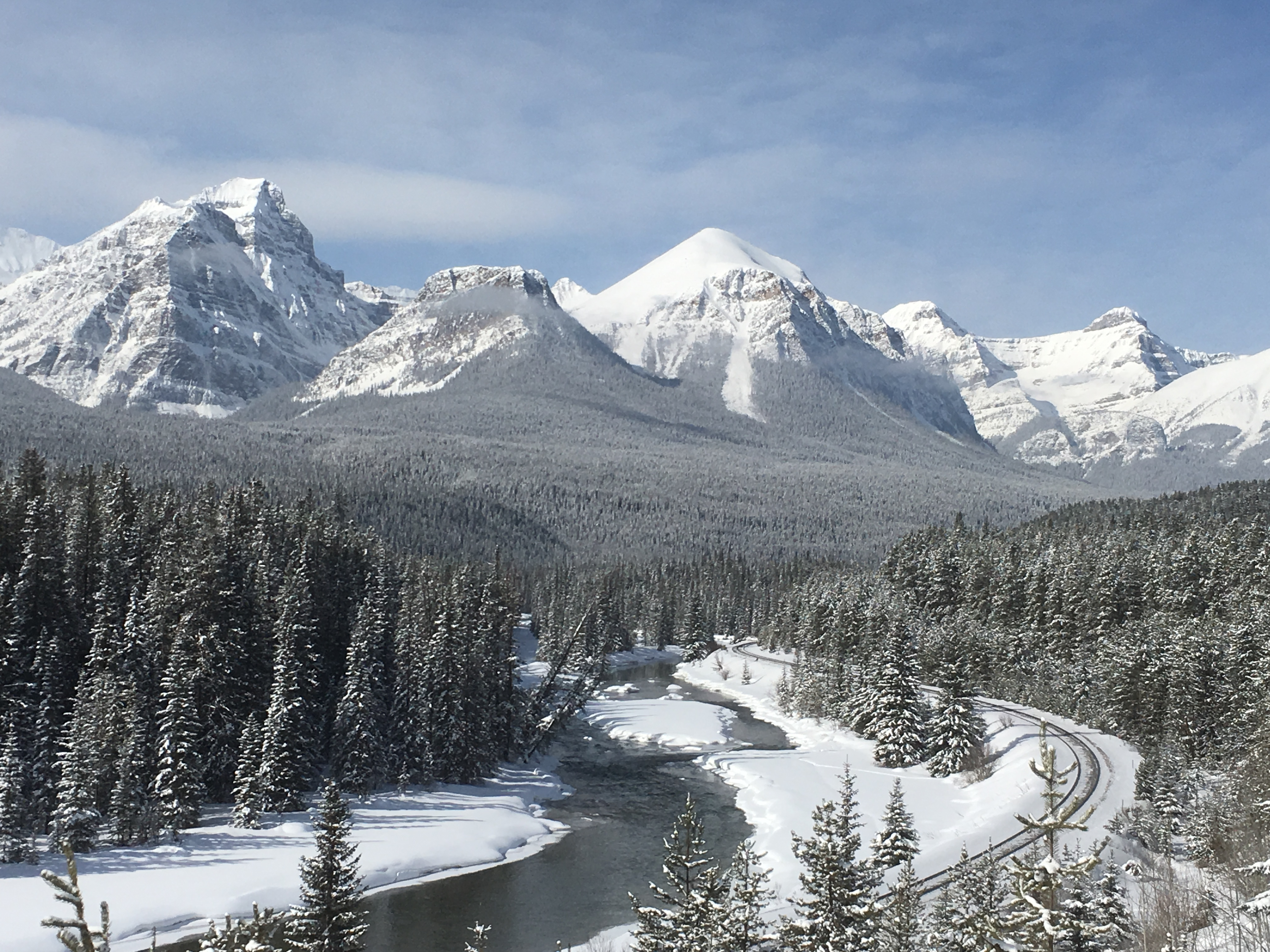
Haddo Peak, highest peak to left, from Morants Curve in winter
L→R Haddo, Saddle Mountain, Fairview, Whyte, Niblock

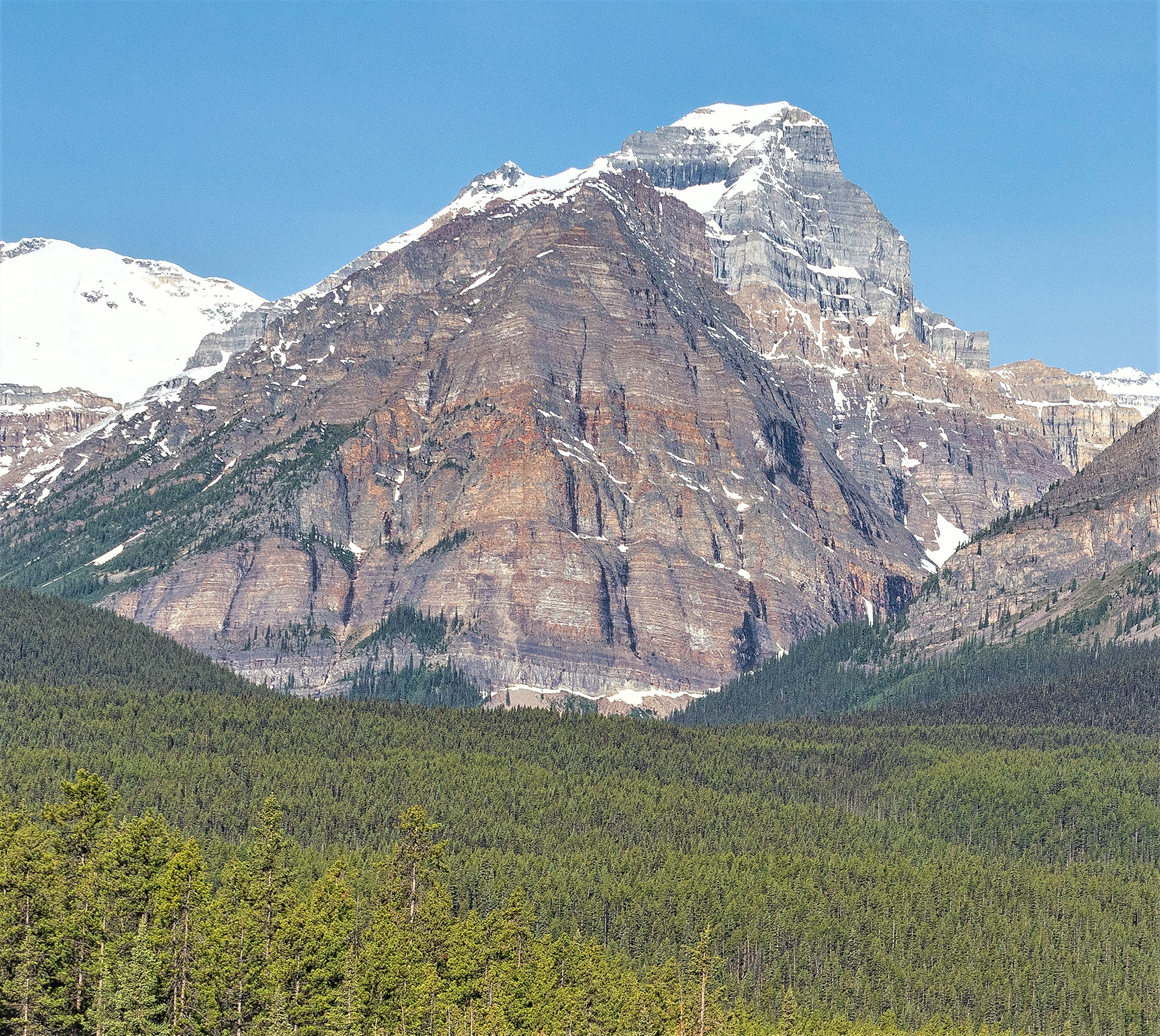
East aspect viewed from Morant's Curve
