= Saddle Mountain (Alberta) =

Mountain in Alberta, Canada

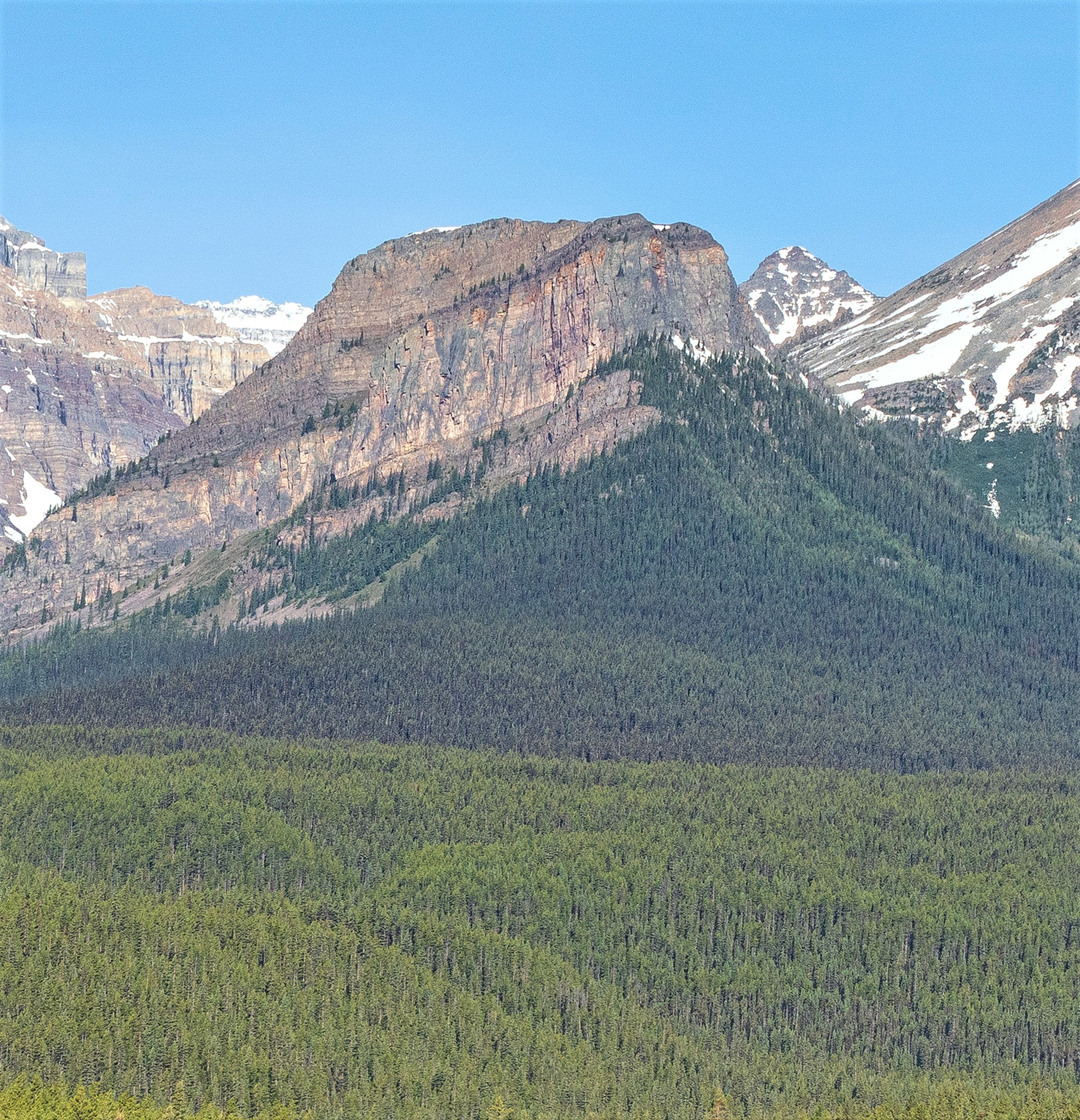
- East aspect

Highest point
- Elevation: 2,433 m (7,982 ft)
- Prominence: 107 m (351 ft)
- Parent peak: Fairview Mountain (2,744 m)
- Isolation: 0.74 km (0.46 mi)
- Listing: Mountains of Alberta
- Coordinates: 51°23′35″N 116°12′31″W

Geography
- Location within Alberta Location within Canada
- Interactive map of Saddle Mountain
- Country: Canada
- Province: Alberta
- Protected area: Banff National Park
- Parent range: Bow Range; Canadian Rockies
- Topo map: NTS 82N8 Lake Louise

Geology
- Rock age: Cambrian
- Rock type: Gog quartzite

Climbing
- Easiest route: Trail + scrambling

Saddle Mountain is a 2,433-metre (7,982 ft) summit in Alberta, Canada.

== Description ==
Saddle Mountain is located in the Bow Valley within Banff National Park, and it is part of the Bow Range of the Canadian Rockies. Lake Louise townsite is situated 4 kilometres (2.5 mi) to the northeast and the Continental Divide is 6 kilometres (3.7 mi) to the west. The nearest higher neighbor is Fairview Mountain, 1.2 km (0.75 mi) to the northwest. Precipitation runoff from Saddle Mountain drains into tributaries of the Bow River. Topographic relief is modest as the summit rises over 600 meters (1,968 ft) above Paradise Creek in one kilometer (0.6 mile) and nearly 900 meters (2,953 ft) above Bow River in 3 km (1.9 mi). The peak is visible from Alberta Highway 1 to the east, and is prominent in the iconic photographs taken from Morant's Curve.

== Access ==
The Paradise Valley Trail leads from Lake Louise to Saddleback Pass, and from the pass an off-trail scramble leads to the top of Saddle Mountain. The summit offers one of the finest views of the area, including the Bow Valley and a close view of the impressive north face of Mount Temple.

== History ==
The mountain's descriptive name was applied in 1894 by Samuel E.S. Allen. The mountain's toponym was officially adopted on April 3, 1952, by the Geographical Names Board of Canada.

== Geology ==
Like other mountains in Banff Park, Saddle Mountain is composed of sedimentary rock laid down during the Precambrian to Jurassic periods. Formed in shallow seas, this sedimentary rock was pushed east and over the top of younger rock during the Laramide orogeny.

== Climate ==
Based on the Köppen climate classification, Saddle Mountain is located in a subarctic climate zone with cold, snowy winters, and mild summers. Winter temperatures can drop below -20 °C with wind chill factors below -30 °C.

== Gallery ==
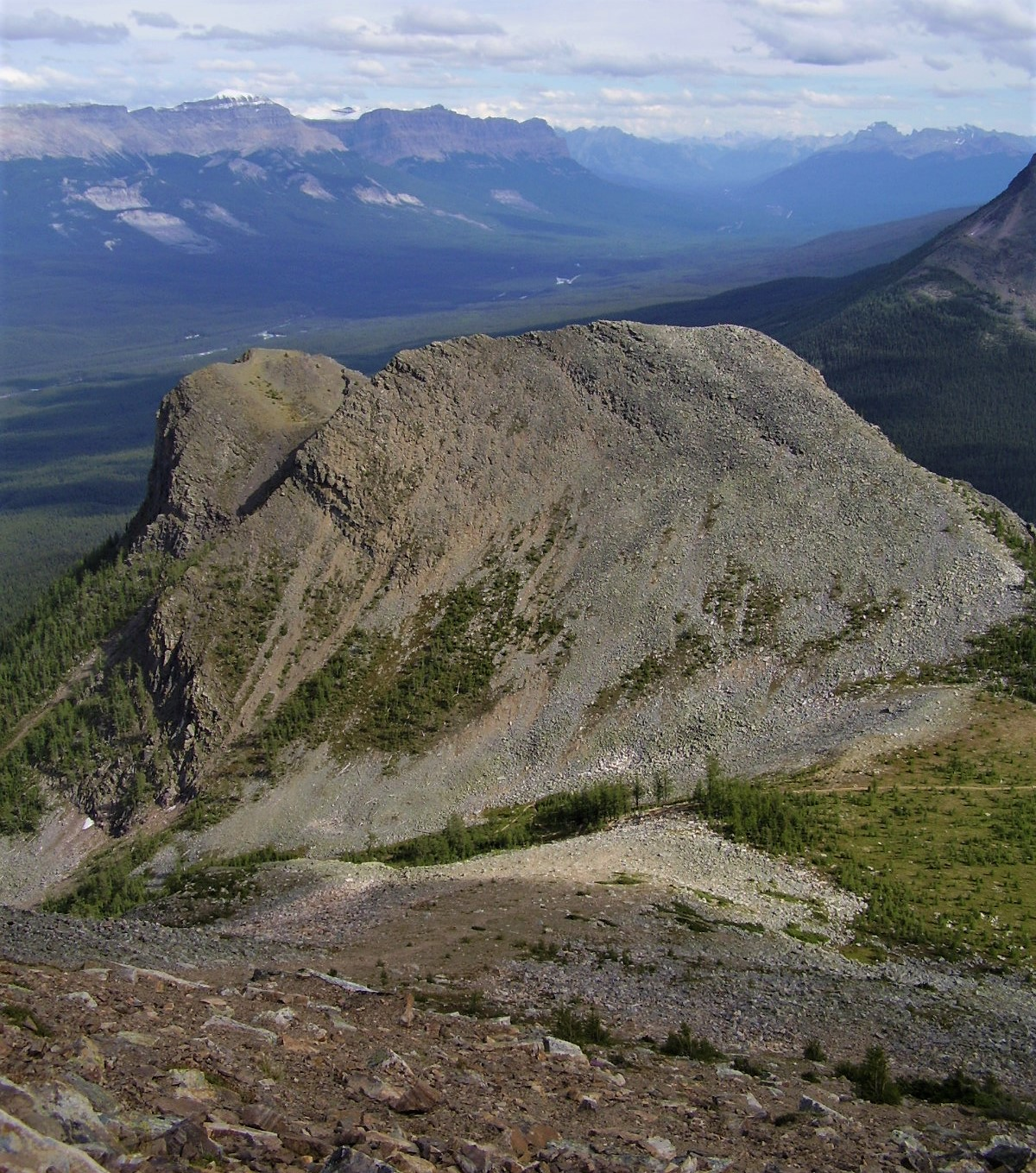
Saddle Mountain seen from the southeast side of Fairview Mountain.
Saddleback Pass in lower right.

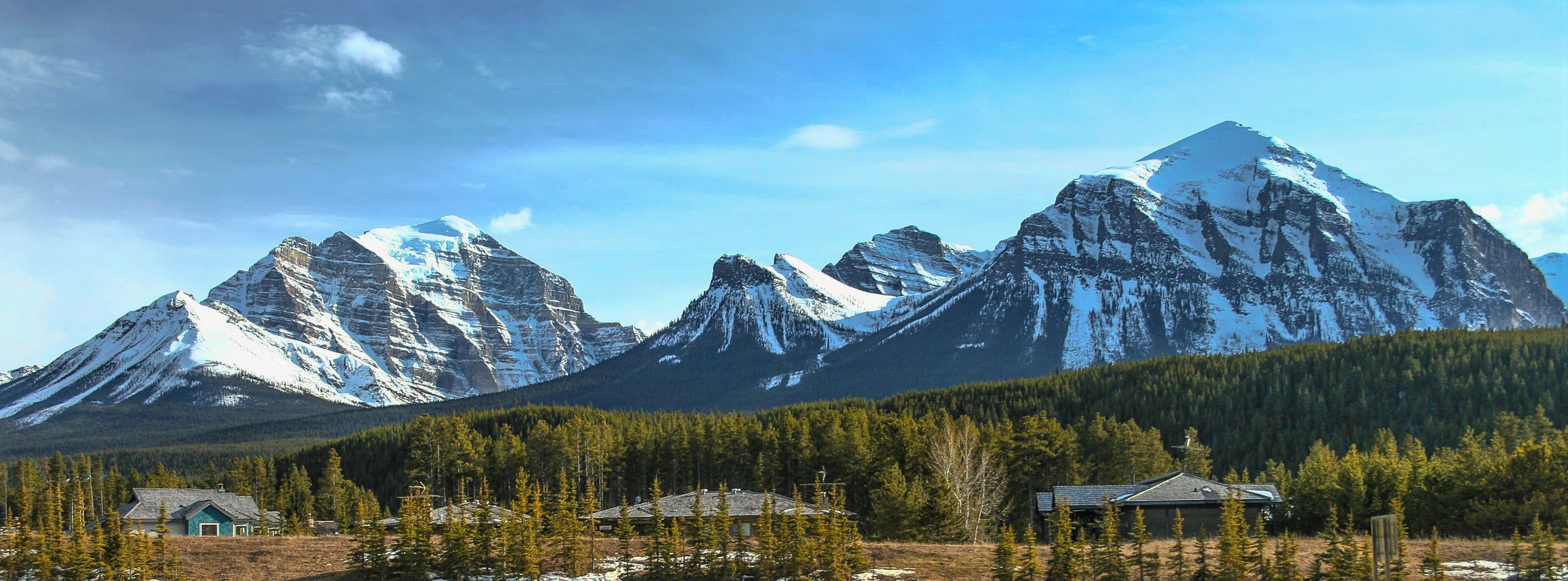
Mt. Temple (left), Saddle Mountain (centre), Fairview Mountain (right).

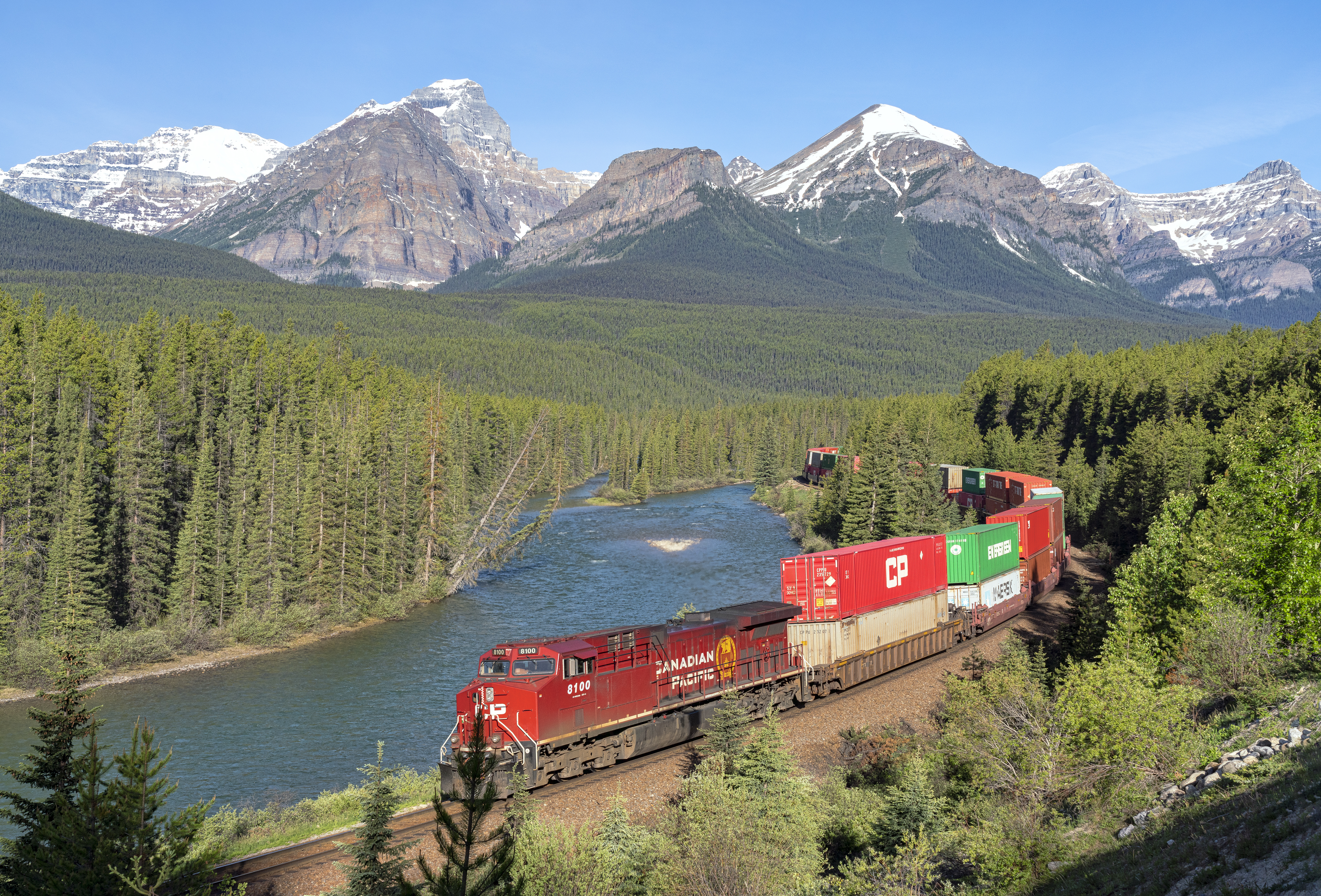
Saddle Mountain (centre) seen from Morant's Curve

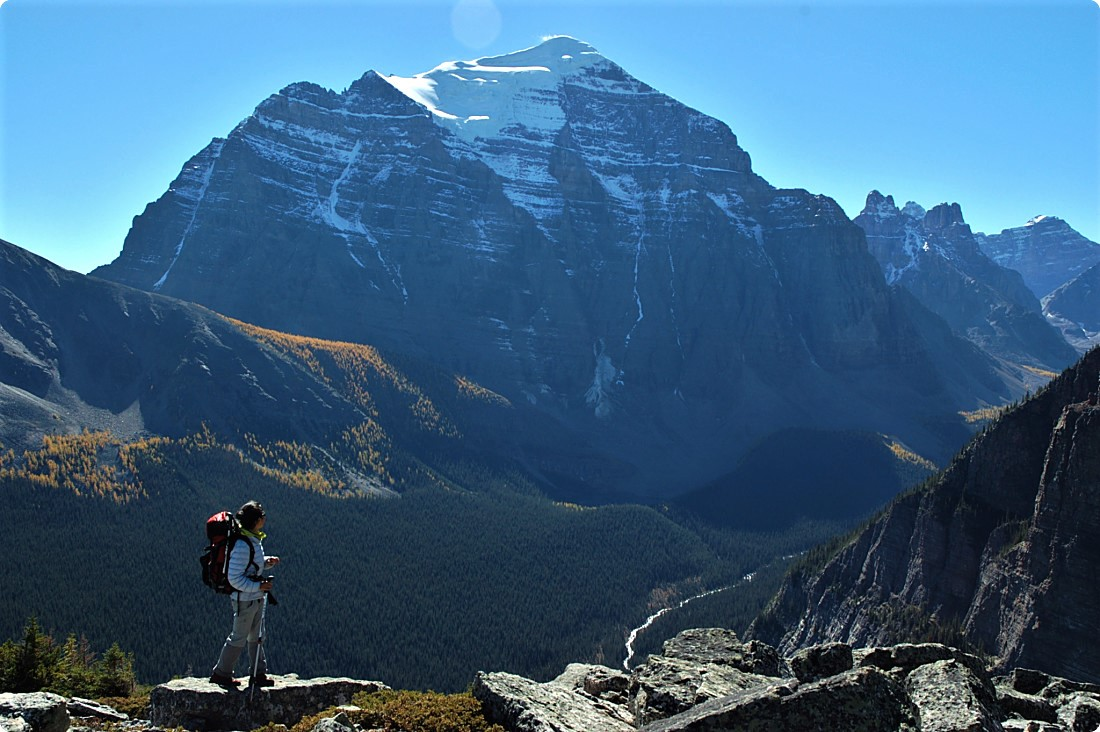
Mount Temple from the summit of Saddle Mountain

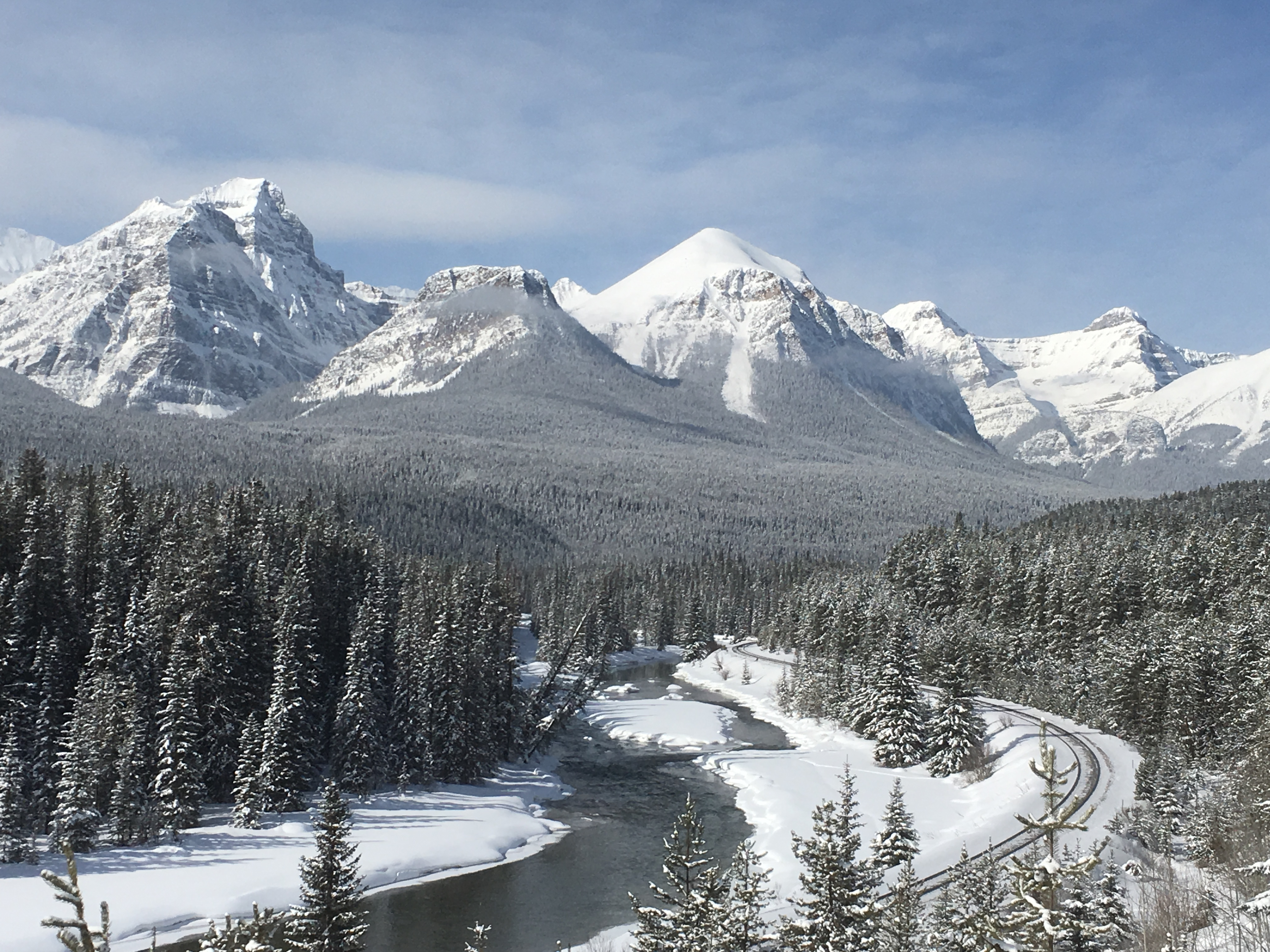
Winter scene from Morant's Curve.
Saddle Mountain left of center.

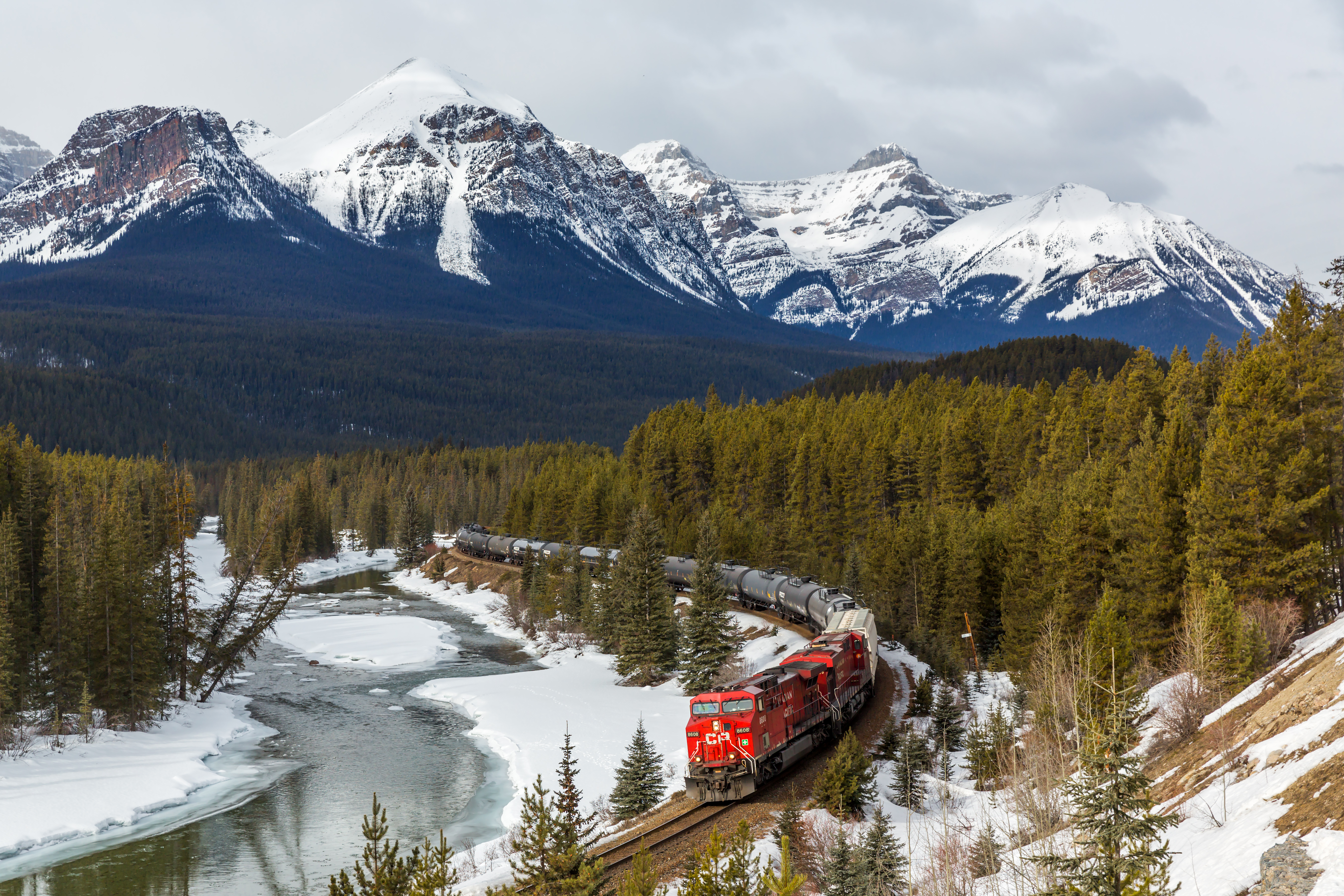
Saddle Mountain (upper left) from Morant's Curve

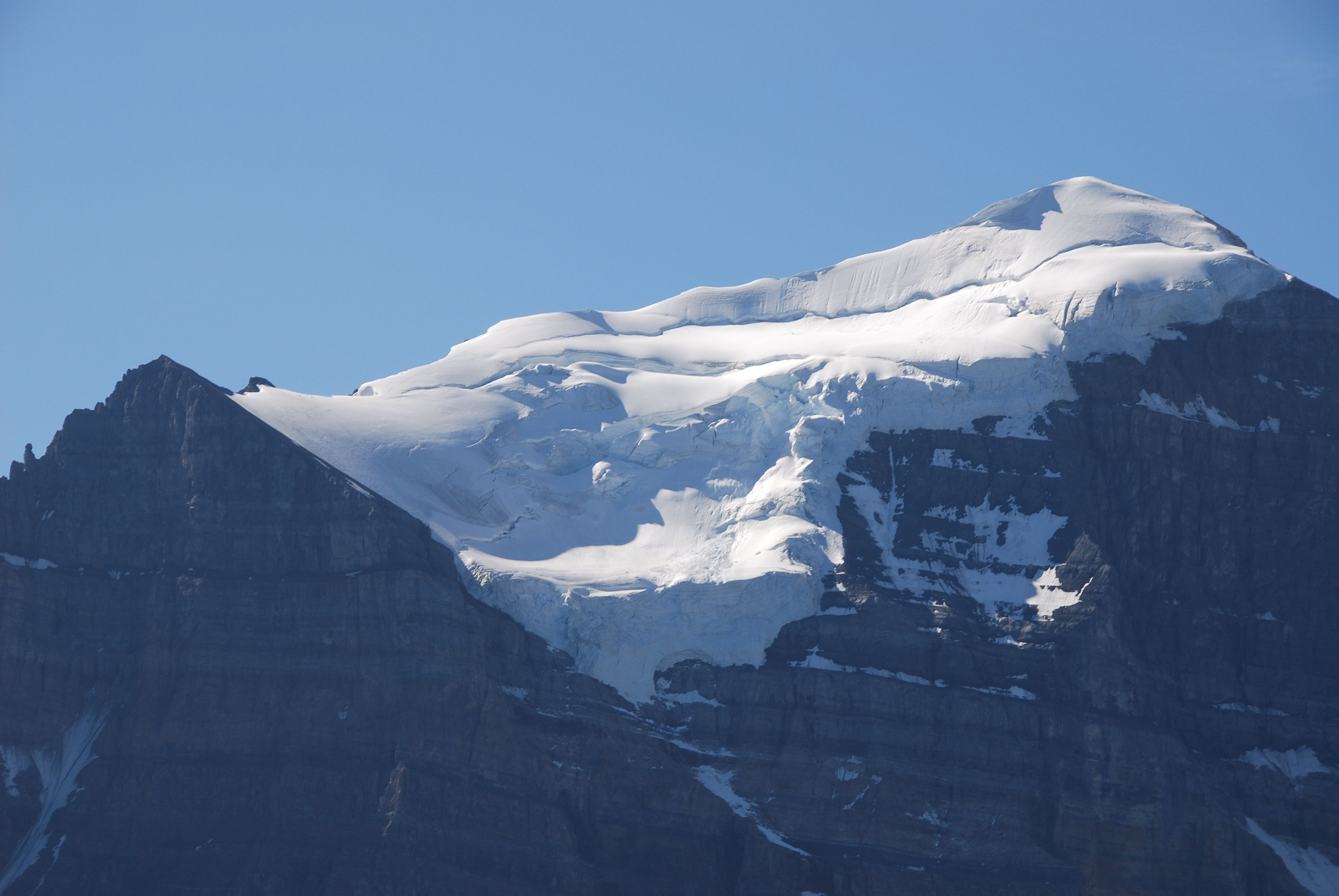
Mount Temple from Saddle Mountain

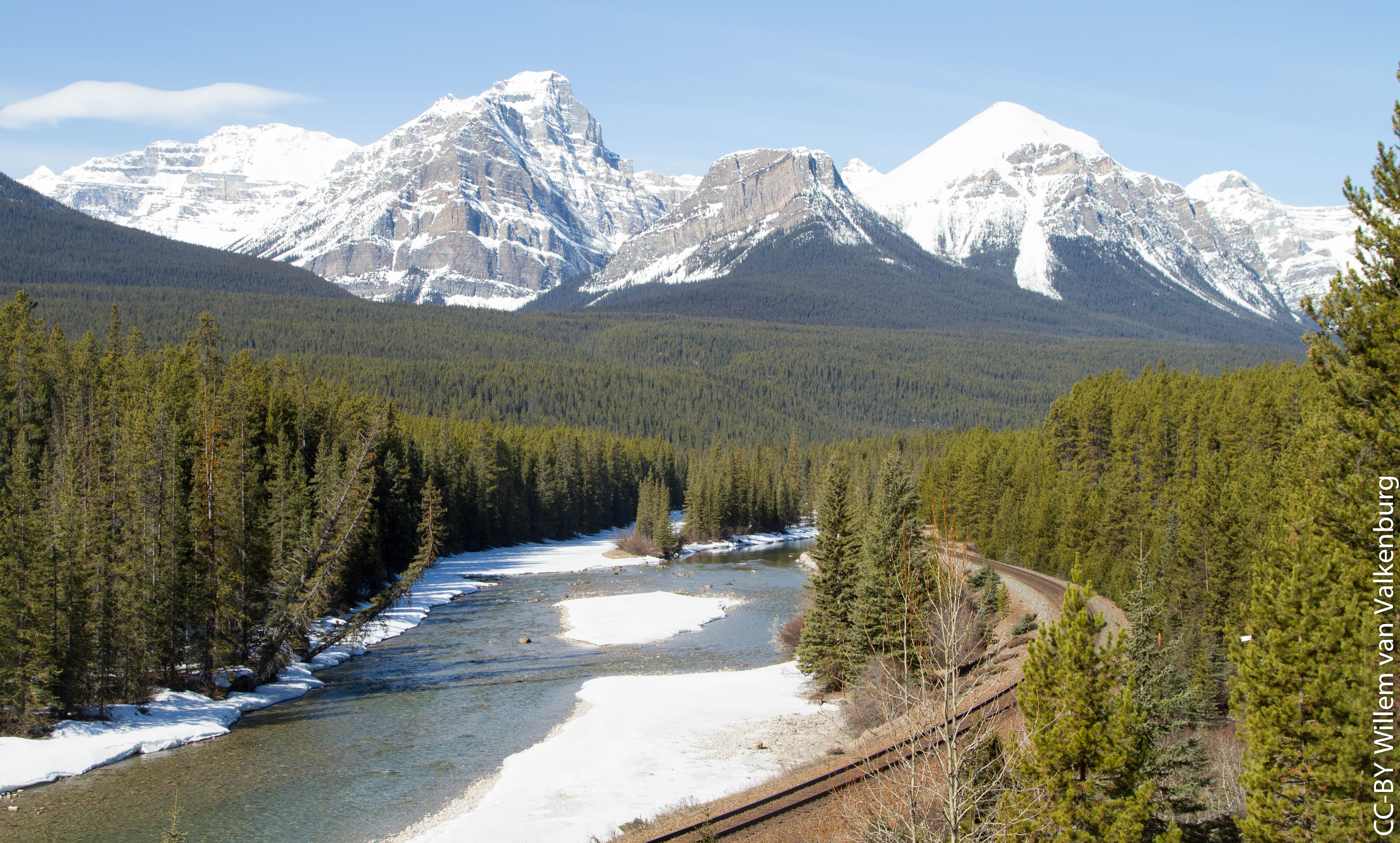
Haddo (left), Saddle Mountain (centre), Fairview Mountain (right), from Morant's Curve

== See also ==
- Geography of Alberta
