= Mount Aberdeen (Alberta) =

Mountain in Alberta, Canada

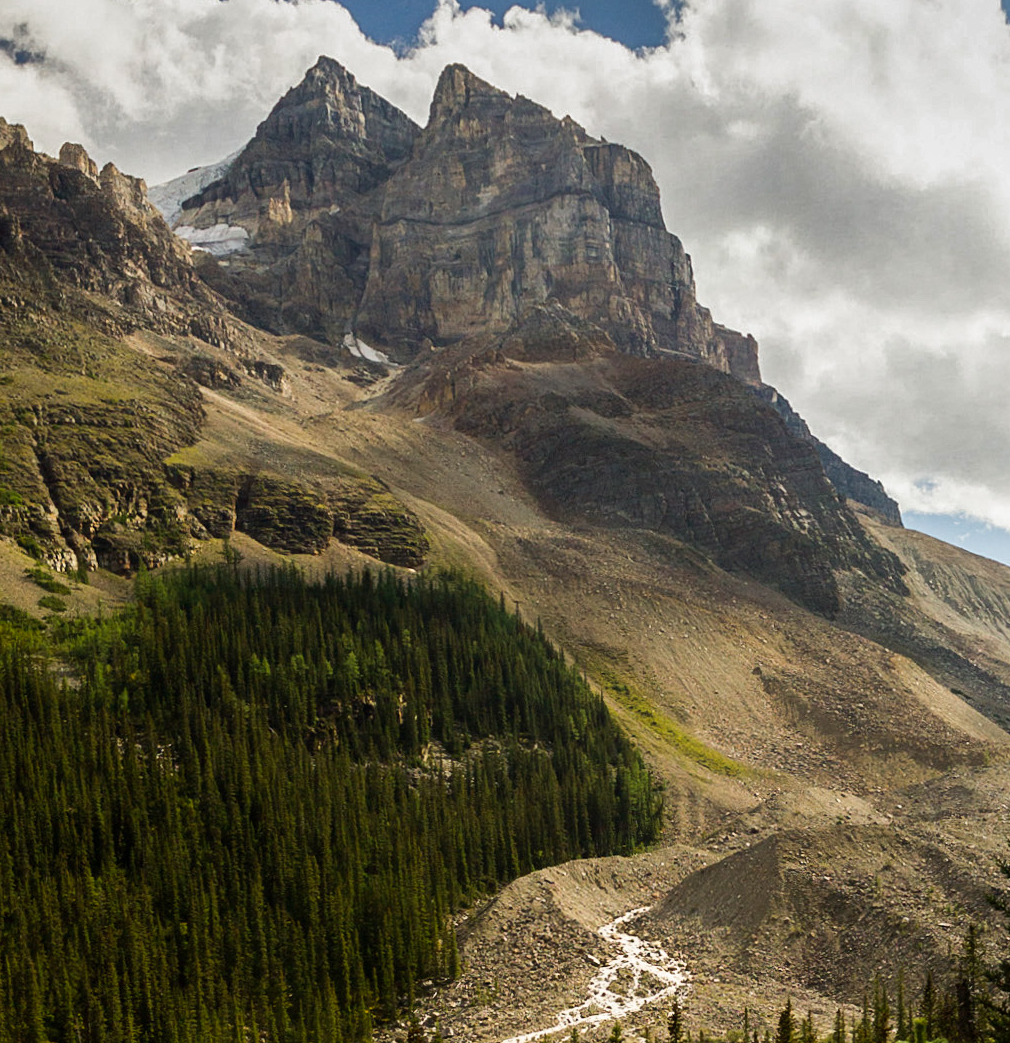
- Mount Aberdeen as seen from the Plain of the Six Glaciers trail

Highest point
- Elevation: 3,152 m (10,341 ft) (Note: Other sources state 3157 m.)
- Prominence: 566 m (1,857 ft) (Note: Based on summit elevation of 3157 m.)
- Parent peak: Mount Lefroy (3442 m)
- Listing: Mountains of Alberta
- Coordinates: 51°22′48″N 116°14′51″W

Geography
- Location within Alberta Location within Canada
- Country: Canada
- Province: Alberta
- Protected area: Banff National Park
- Parent range: Bow Range
- Topo map: NTS 82N8 Lake Louise

Geology
- Rock age: Cambrian
- Rock type: Sedimentary rock

Climbing
- First ascent: 1894 Samuel E.S. Allen, L.F. Frissel, Walter Wilcox

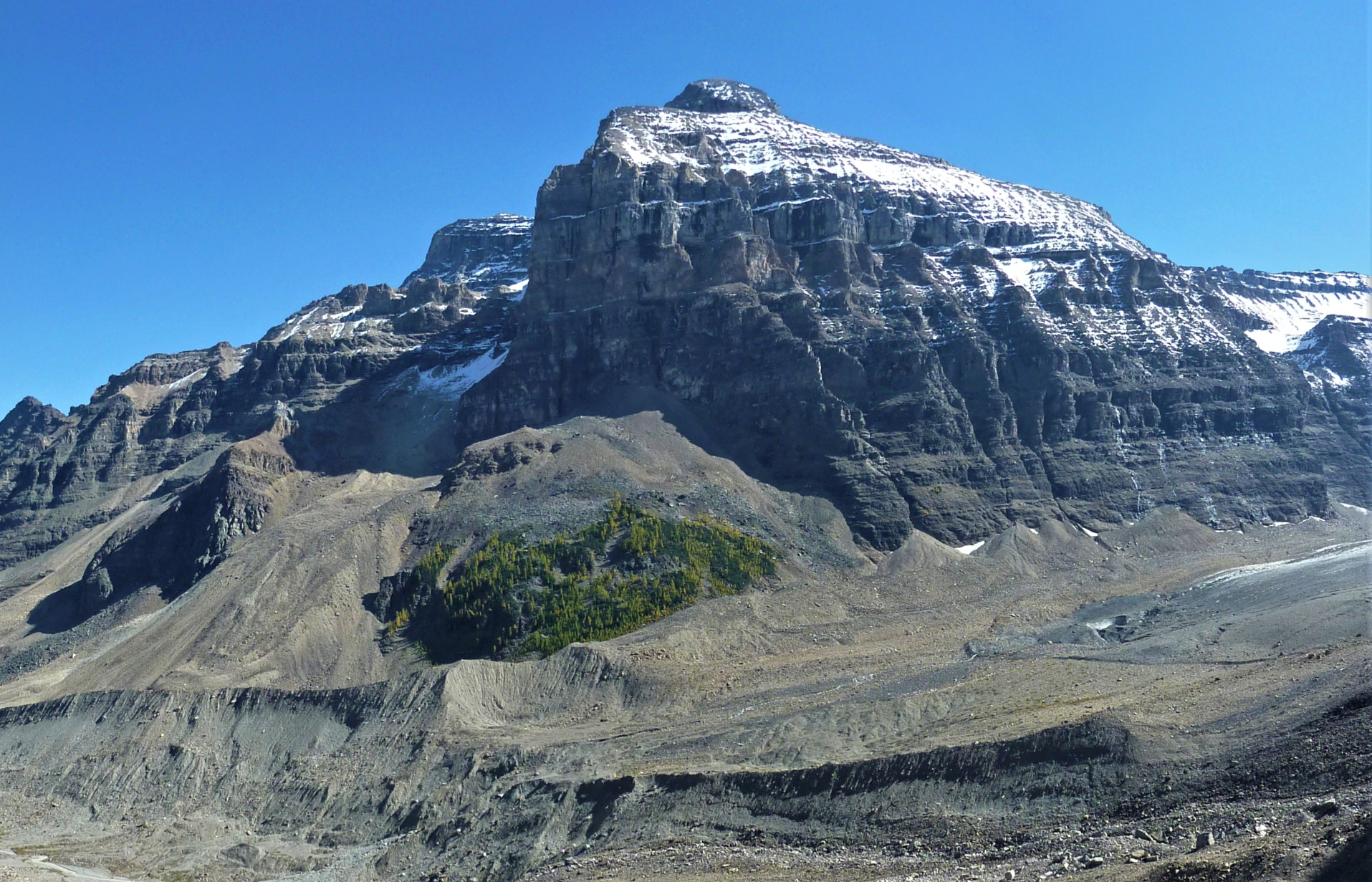
Mount Aberdeen from Plain of Six Glaciers Trail

Mount Aberdeen is a 3,152-metre (10,341-foot) mountain summit located in the Lake Louise area of Banff National Park, in the Canadian Rockies of Alberta, Canada. Its nearest higher peak is Mount Lefroy, 2.9 km (1.8 mi) to the southwest. Haddo Peak is on the same massif with Mount Aberdeen, and the Aberdeen Glacier is between the two peaks.

== History ==
Mount Aberdeen was named by James J. McArthur in 1897 for Lord Aberdeen, 7th Governor General of Canada. Prior to 1897 it was known as Hazel Peak, but there is no record of who Hazel was.

The first ascent of the peak was made in 1894 by Samuel E.S. Allen, L.F. Frissel, and Walter D. Wilcox. In 1917, V.A. Flynn reached the summit by traversing from the top of Haddo Peak with a descent to the Aberdeen Glacier and then up over steep snow and an ice arête.

The mountain's name was made official in 1952 by the Geographical Names Board of Canada.

== Geology ==
Like other mountains in Banff Park, Mount Aberdeen is composed of sedimentary rock laid down during the Precambrian to Jurassic periods. Formed in shallow seas, this sedimentary rock was pushed east and over the top of younger rock during the Laramide orogeny.

== Climate ==
Based on the Köppen climate classification, this mountain is located in a subarctic climate zone with cold, snowy winters, and mild summers. Temperatures can drop below −20 °C (−4 °F) with wind chill factors below −30 °C (−22 °F).

== See also ==
- List of mountains in the Canadian Rockies
- Geology of Alberta
