= Walter Wilcox =

Walter Dwight Wilcox (1869–1949) was an early explorer of the Canadian Rockies, especially in the Lake Louise region.

== Life ==
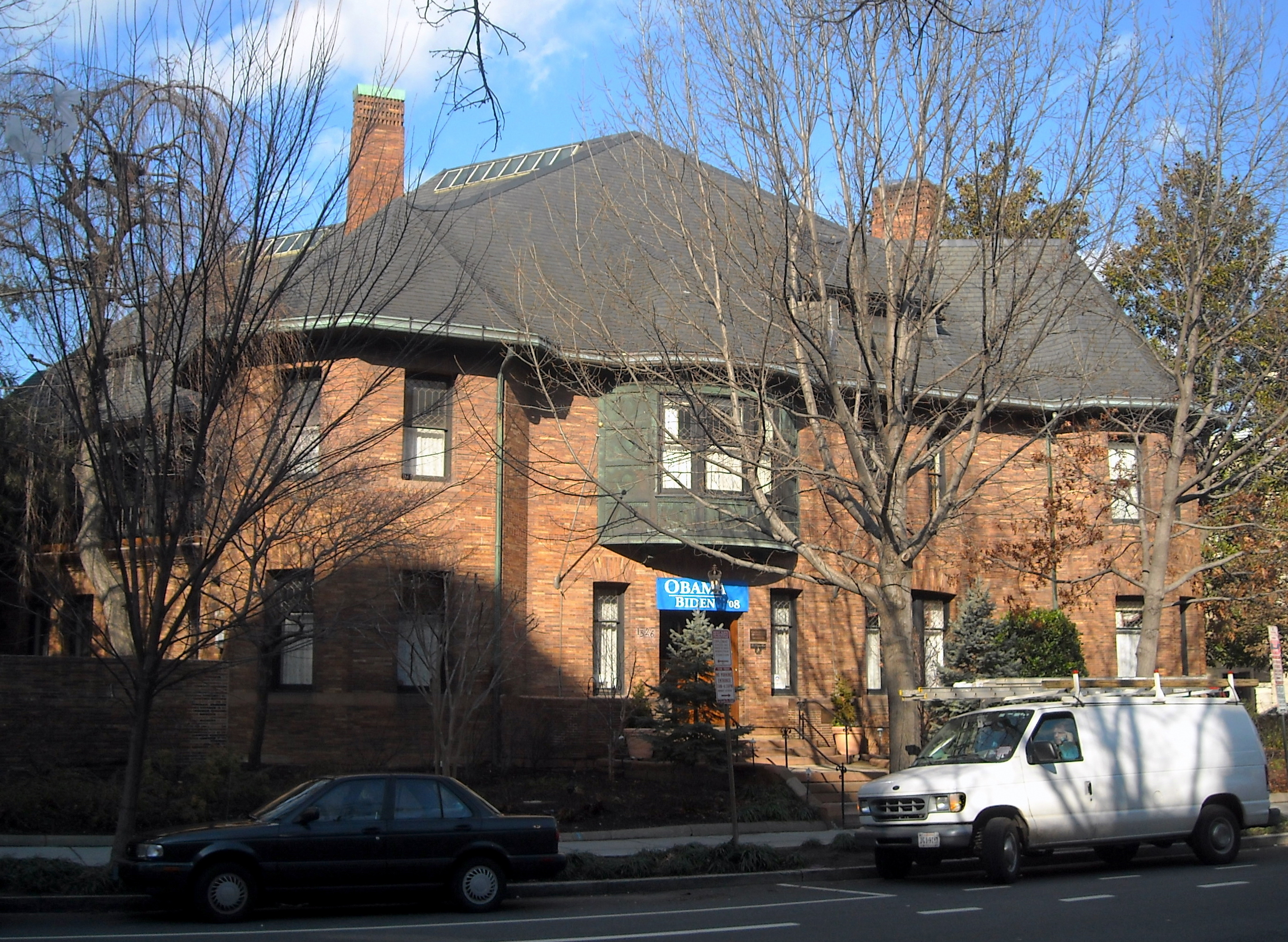
From 1911 to 1926, Wilcox lived in this Washington, D.C. home, better known as the Whittemore House.

Wilcox was educated at Phillips Academy, Andover (Class of 1889) and Yale University (1893).

Walter Wilcox is known for his 1890s discovery and exploration of Paradise Valley, Desolation Valley and Prospector Valley near Lake Louise. He is accredited with the first ascents of Mount Temple (3,543m), on Aug. 17, 1894 with Samuel E. S. Allen and Lewis Frissell. Walter Wilcox made the first ascent on Mount Aberdeen (3,152m), Mount Niblock (2,976m), Mount Indefatigable (2,670m), and Cheops Mountain (2581m).

In 1898, Mount Wilcox (2,884m) in the Columbia Icefield area of Jasper National Park was named in Wilcox's honour by J. Norman Collie. The pass that provides easy access to Mt. Wilcox was also named Wilcox Pass.

== Works ==
- Camping in the Canadian Rockies: An Account of Camp Life in the Wilder Parts of the Canadian Rocky Mountains, Together with a Description of the Region About Banff, Lake Louise and Glacier, and a Sketch of the Early Explorations. G.P. Putnam's Sons, 1896
- The Rockies of Canada. G.P. Putnam's Sons, 1900
- "Among the Mahogany Forests of Cuba," Walter D. Wilcox, National Geographic, July 1908, Vol. XIX No. 7.
