= USS Haddo =

USS Haddo may refer to more than one United States Navy ship:

- USS Haddo (SS-255), a submarine in commission from 1942 to 1946
- USS Haddo (SSN-604), a submarine in commission from 1964 to 1991
