= McMorrin Glacier =

Glacier in Antarctica

Coordinates: 67°59′S 67°10′W

McMorrin Glacier is a glacier flowing west from Mount Metcalfe to Marguerite Bay in Graham Land, Antarctica. it was named by the UK Antarctic Place-Names Committee for Ian McMorrin, a British Antarctic Survey general assistant at Stonington Island, 1961–63, who helped survey this area in 1962.
