= Mount Wilcox (Alberta) =

Mountain in Jasper NP, Alberta, Canada

- Wilcox Peak
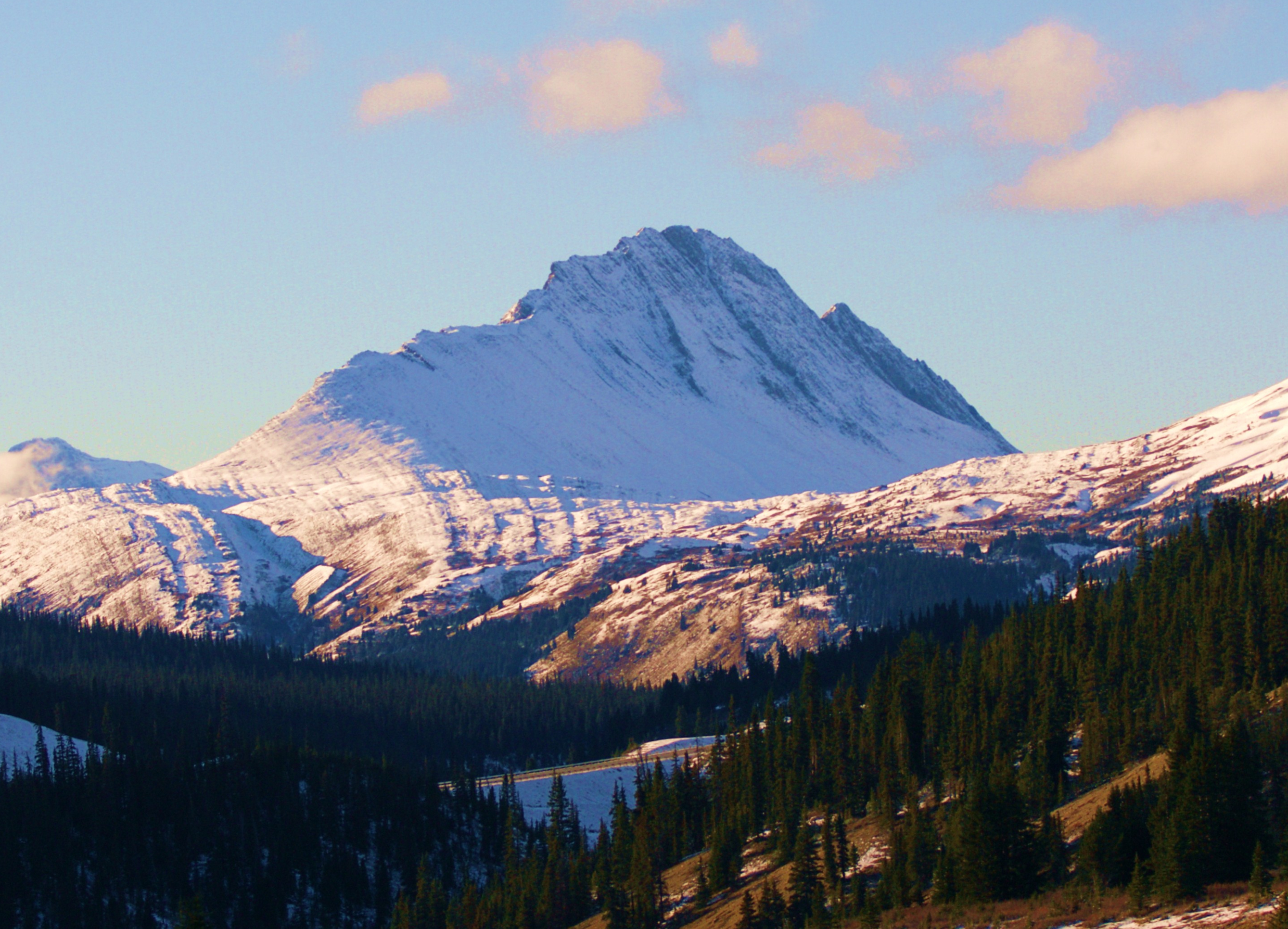
- Looking northwest to Mount Wilcox

Highest point
- Elevation: 2,884 m (9,462 ft)
- Prominence: 509 m (1,670 ft)
- Parent peak: Nigel Peak (3211 m)
- Listing: Mountains of Alberta
- Coordinates: 52°14′42″N 117°14′29″W

Geography
- Location within Alberta Location within Canada
- Interactive map of Mount Wilcox
- Country: Canada
- Province: Alberta
- Protected area: Jasper National Park
- Parent range: Columbia Icefield; Canadian Rockies
- Topo map: NTS 83C3 Columbia Icefield

Climbing
- First ascent: 1896 R.L. Barrett, Walter D. Wilcox
- Easiest route: Scramble

Mount Wilcox (also known as Wilcox Peak) is a 2,884-metre (9,462-foot) mountain summit located in the Canadian Rockies of Alberta, Canada. It is located in Jasper National Park right beside the Columbia Icefield visitor centre with the Icefields Parkway traversing the western base of the mountain. Its nearest higher peak is Nigel Peak, 3.35 km (2.08 mi) to the northeast. Mount Wilcox is a moderate scramble from Wilcox Pass. Due to its location, it provides one of the best views of the Athabasca Glacier.

== History ==
The mountain was named Wilcox Peak by J. Norman Collie in 1899 after Walter D. Wilcox, an early explorer of the Canadian Rockies who also made the first ascent of the peak in 1896. The mountain's Wilcox Peak name was officially adopted in 1924 by the Geographical Names Board of Canada. The Board changed it to Mount Wilcox in 1928, until ultimately reverting to Wilcox Peak in 1956.

== Climate ==
Based on the Köppen climate classification, Wilcox Peak is located in a subarctic climate with cold, snowy winters, and mild summers. Temperatures can drop below -20 °C with wind chill factors below -30 °C. In terms of favorable weather, June through September are the best months to climb. Precipitation runoff from the peak flows into the Sunwapta River which in turn is a tributary of the Athabasca River.

== Gallery ==
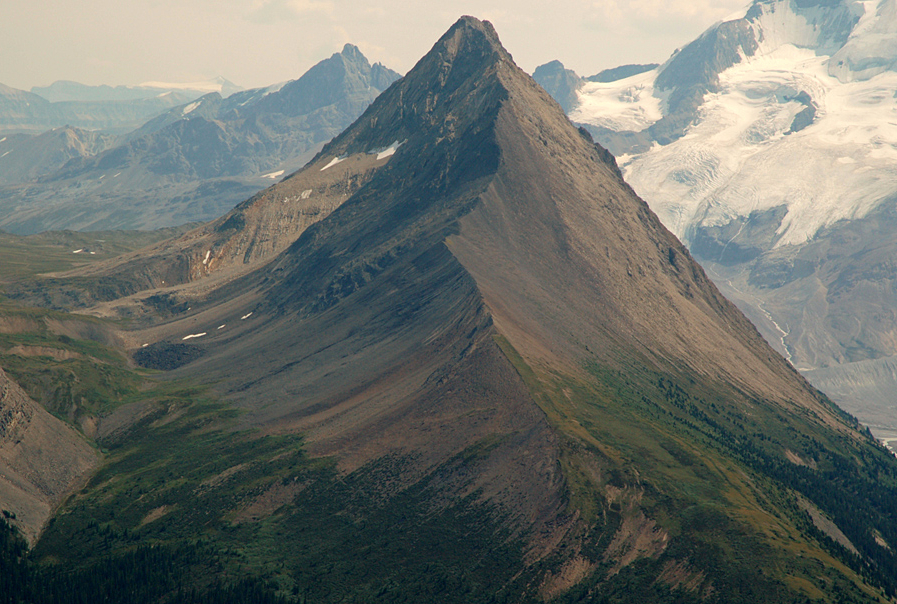
Wilcox's north ridge seen from Tangle Ridge

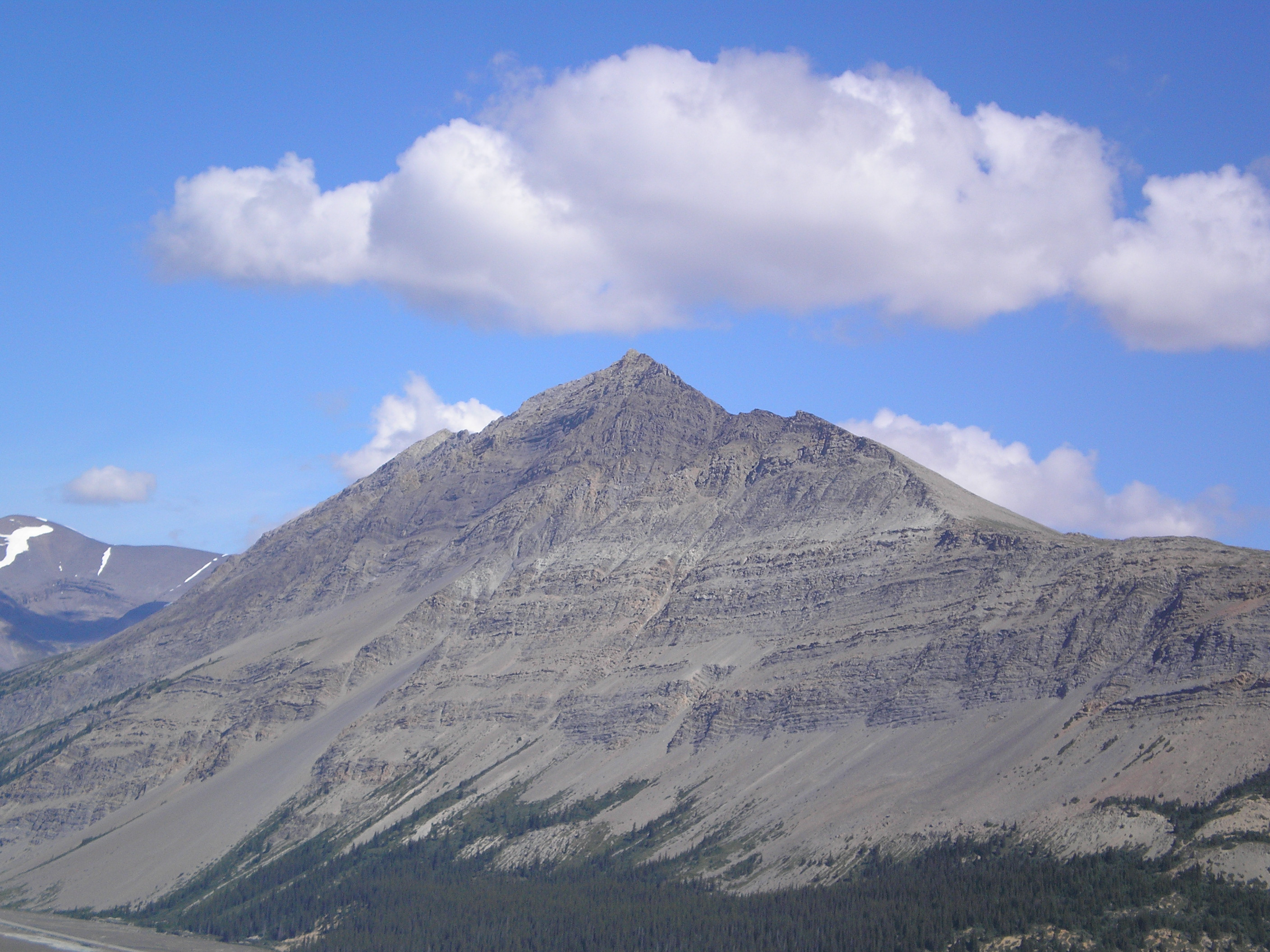
Mount Wilcox seen from Athabasca Glacier.

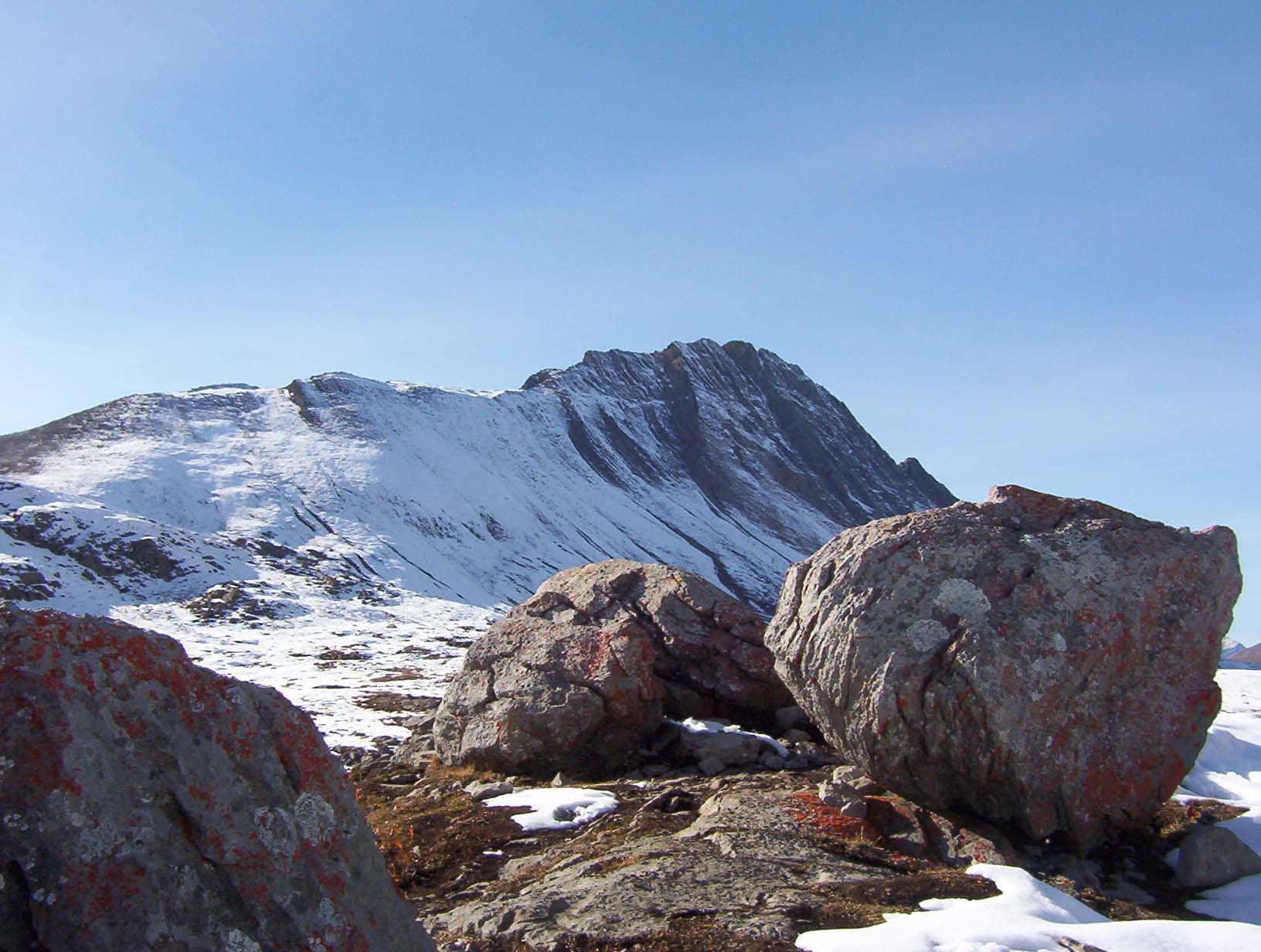
Mount Wilcox seen from Wilcox Pass

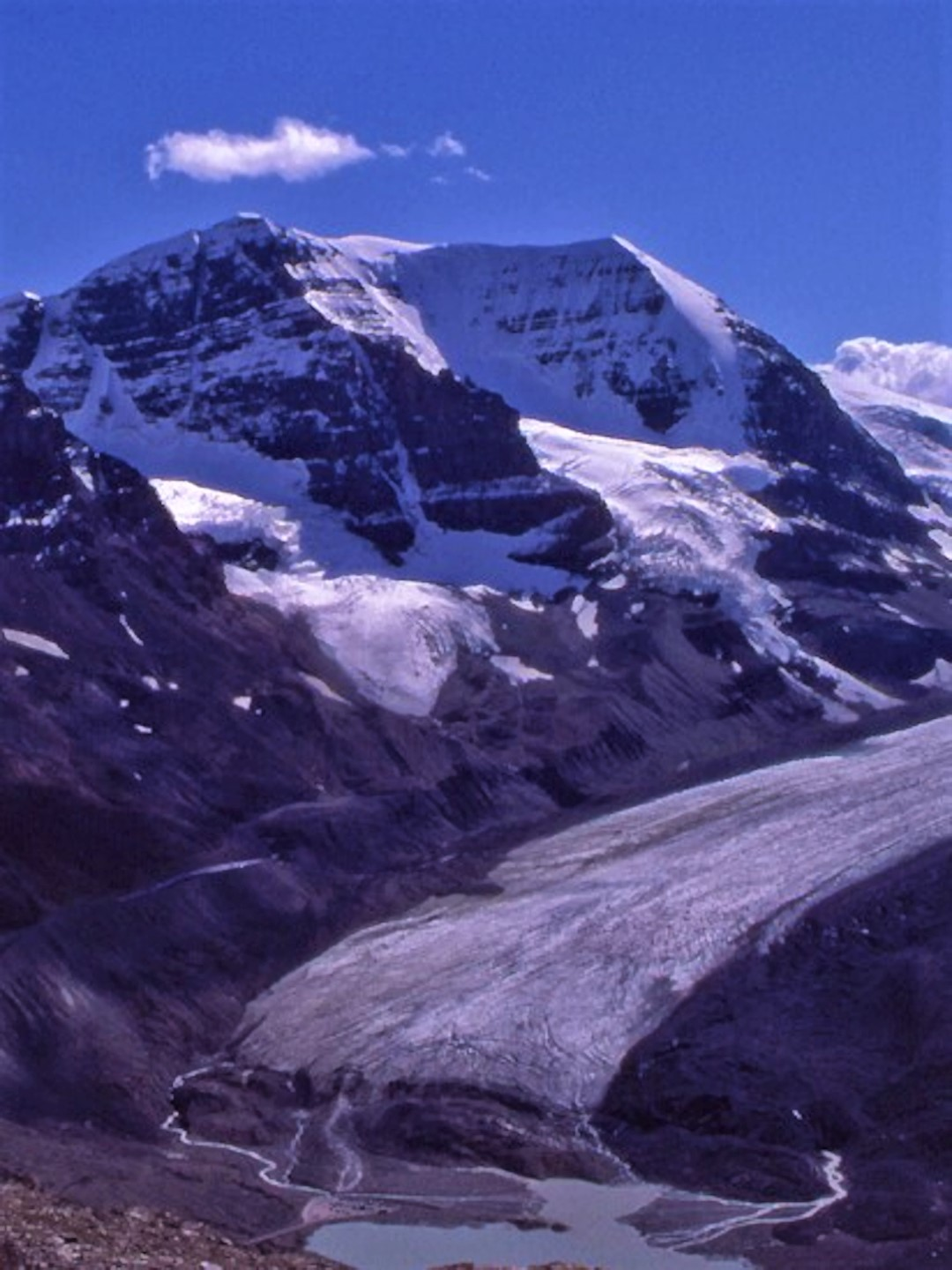
Mt. Andromeda as seen from Wilcox Pass

== See also ==
- Geography of Alberta
- List of mountains in the Canadian Rockies
