= Mount Temple (Alberta) =

Mountain in Banff NP, Canada

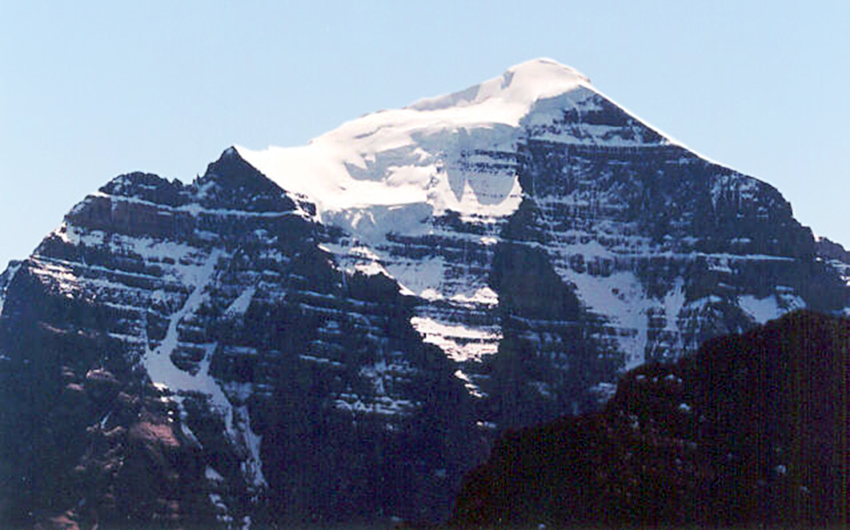
- North face of Mt. Temple from Mt. Fairview

Highest point
- Elevation: 3,544 m (11,627 ft)
- Prominence: 1,544 m (5,066 ft)
- Listing: Mountains of Alberta; Canada highest major peaks 37th; Canada prominent peaks 128th; Ultra
- Coordinates: 51°21′02″N 116°12′24″W

Geography
- Location within Alberta
- Interactive map of Mount Temple
- Country: Canada
- Province: Alberta
- Parent range: Bow Range
- Topo map: NTS 82N8 Lake Louise

Geology
- Rock age: 550 million years
- Mountain type(s): Quartzite and limestone

Climbing
- First ascent: 1894 by Walter Wilcox, Samuel Allen and L.F. Frissel
- Easiest route: Scramble (SW)

Mount Temple is a mountain in Banff National Park of the Canadian Rockies of Alberta, Canada.

Mt. Temple is located in the Bow River Valley between Paradise Creek and Moraine Creek and is the highest peak in the Lake Louise area. The peak dominates the western landscape along the Trans-Canada Highway from Castle Junction to Lake Louise.

== History ==
The mountain was named by George Mercer Dawson in 1884 after Sir Richard Temple who visited the Canadian Rockies that same year. Mt. Temple was the first 11,000-foot (3,400 m) peak to be climbed in the Canadian segment of the Rocky Mountains.

== Climbing ==
Accidents

- On July 11, 1955, in one of Canada's most tragic mountaineering accidents, seven American male teenagers were killed on the southwest ridge route. A warm summer day had caused several nearby avalanches. They finally decided to turn back and during the descent, an avalanche swept 10 members of the party 200 m (656 ft) down the snowfield through a bottleneck of rocks. The entire party only had one ice axe among them and were not well prepared for the seriousness of the route. The party had also gone up the route without either of their two group leaders.
- On Sept. 25, 2015, Jen Kunze, an avid runner and hiker from Calgary, Ab. fell to her death.
- On July 11, 2022, Matt Miller, a man from Edmonton fell to his death while hiking with a group of experienced hikers.

Routes

The mountain offers several routes for climbers and the normal route on the southwest side offers a moderate class scrambling route. See Scrambles in the Canadian Rockies for a description of that route.

- South-West Ridge (Normal Route) (I)
  - By late July or early August, the southwest ridge is generally free of snow and is a moderate scramble for experienced parties.
- East Ridge (IV 5.7)
- North Face, Elzinga/Miller (IV 5.7)
- North Face, Geenwood/Locke (V, AI 2, 5.8, A2 or 5.10+ R or M6)
- North East Buttress, Greenwood/Jones (V, 5.7, A3 or 5.10) One of the most secure routes on the north side of the mountain. Free climbed in August 1983, René Boisselle and Bernard Faure.

Current route conditions can be obtained from a climbing warden at the park information centre in Lake Louise. A climber's log outside the centre may also provide comments from other climbers.

First Ascent

- August 17, 1894 Walter D. Wilcox, Samuel E. S. Allen and Lewis Frissell This was the first ascent of a peak above 11,000 feet (3,353 m) in the Canadian Rockies.

First Winter Ascent

- January 2, 1969 James Jones and Dave Haley via the Southwest Ridge

== Gallery ==
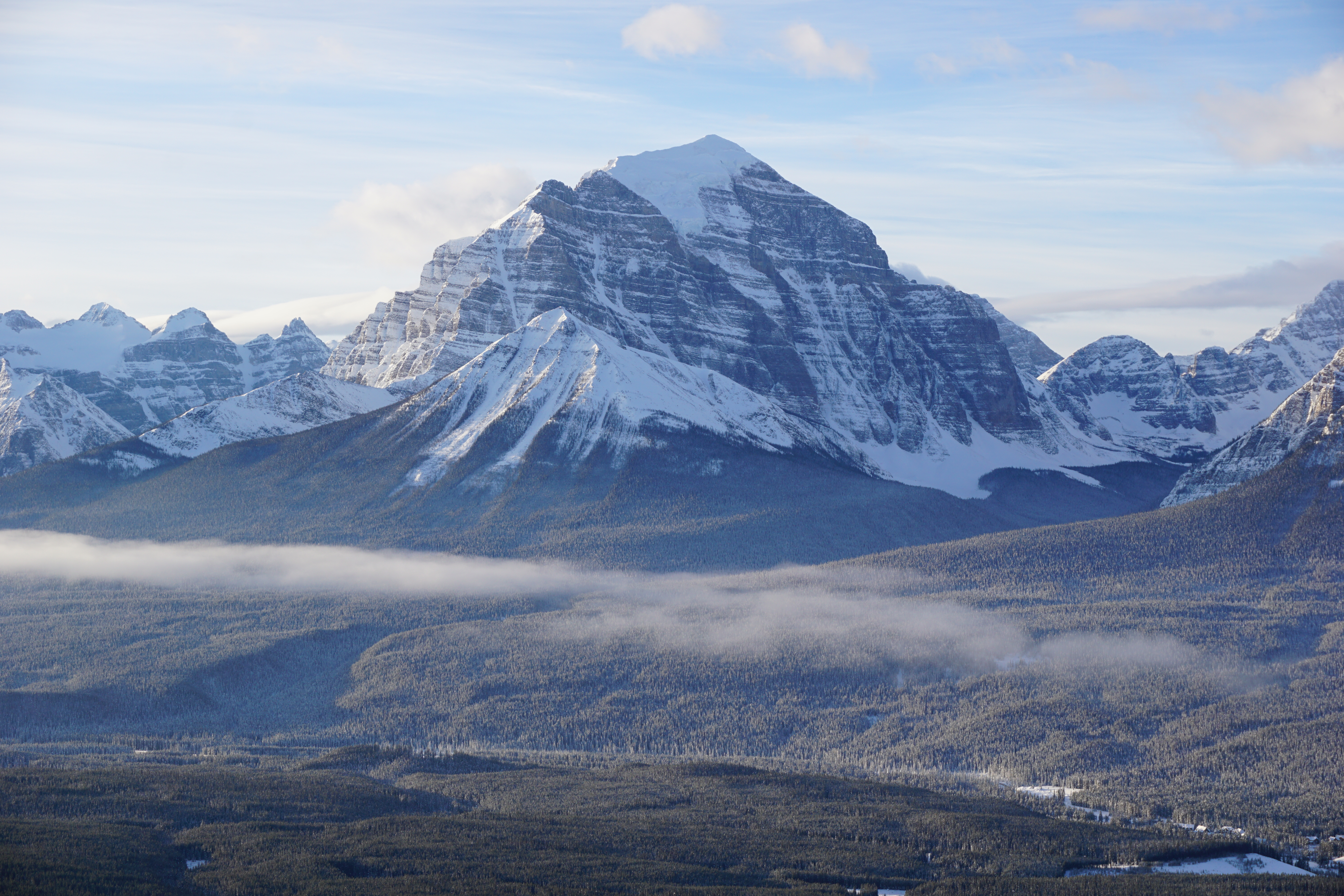
Mount Temple in winter

== See also ==
- Mountain peaks of Canada
- List of mountains in the Canadian Rockies
- List of mountain peaks of North America
- List of mountain peaks of the Rocky Mountains
