= Mount Wilcox (Antarctica) =

Mountain in Graham Land, Antarctica

Mount Wilcox (67°57′S 66°56′W) is a mountain with a sharp, rocky, triangular peak surmounting the southeast corner of Square Bay, 13 kilometres (8 mi) east of Camp Point on the west coast of Graham Land, Antarctica. The mountain was apparently first seen and roughly charted in 1909 by the French Antarctic Expedition under Charcot. It was surveyed in 1936 by the British Graham Land Expedition (BGLE) under John Rymill and was photographed from the air in 1940 by the United States Antarctic Service (USAS). The name, proposed by Colonel Lawrence Martin, is for Phineas Wilcox, mate on the Hero, in which Captain Nathaniel Palmer explored the Antarctic mainland south of Deception Island in 1820.
