= Beverley Cochrane Cayley =

Canadian lawyer and mountaineer (1898-1928)

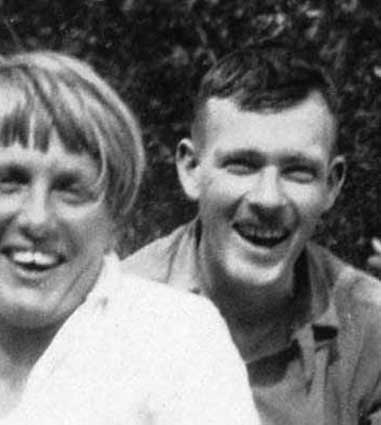
- Beverley Cayley (right) and woman.
- Born: Beverley Cochrane Cayley; October 25, 1898; Grand Forks, British Columbia, Canada
- Died: June 8, 1928 (aged 29); Vancouver, British Columbia, Canada
- Education: University of British Columbia
- Occupations: Mountaineer; Lawyer

Beverley Cochrane Cayley (October 25, 1898 – June 8, 1928) was a Canadian lawyer and mountaineer.

== Early life ==
Cayley was born on October 25, 1898, in Grand Forks, British Columbia. He was the only child of Canadian politician and County Court judge Hugh S. Cayley and Leonora Adelaide Cochrane.

He attended the University of British Columbia, where he was interested in literature and was one of the first editors of The Ubyssey. Cayley graduated from the Arts faculty in 1918. He was called to the BC bar in 1921.

== Mountaineering ==
Cayley was an ardent mountaineer and a member of the executive committees of the British Columbia Mountaineering Club (BCMC) and the Vancouver section of the Alpine Club of Canada.

He made one of the first winter ascents of the West Lion in February 1924, and one of the first ascents of Foley Peak (Easter 1924) and Mount Robie Read (May 1925).

He also climbed Mount Victoria, Ringrose Peak, Mount Huber, Pinnacle Mountain, Mount Temple and other peaks of the southern Rockies. He made several ascents in the Robson District. He climbed Mount Sir Donald in the Selkirk Mountains, Mount Baker in Washington State, Mount Garibaldi and other peaks of Garibaldi Provincial Park, and made numerous excursions to the mountains around Vancouver.

Cayley's last climb was Mount Garibaldi in 1926.

== Death and legacy ==
In 1926, Cayley became terminally ill with tuberculosis. He died in Vancouver on June 8, 1928.

From July 7 – 14, 1928, a group of Cayley's friends from the Alpine Club of Canada – E.C. Brooks, W.G. Wheatley, B. Clegg, R.E. Knight, and T. Fyles – completed an expedition in honour of Beverley, becoming the first to climb a volcanic mountain peak between the Cheakamus and Squamish rivers, which they named Mount Cayley.

His obituary was the first to appear in the BCMC monthly newsletter: “The passing of Mr BC Cayley, who for many years was an active member of our organization, came as a great shock to us. Possessed with the true spirit of the Mountaineer, Bev was one whose genial personality made for him a great circle of friends, who held him high in their esteem...”

The Beverley Cayley Prize at UBC was endowed through a bequest of his mother. The $200 prize is awarded to the male student obtaining the highest standing in a first year course in English.

He is buried in Ocean View Cemetery.
