= Narao Peak =

Summit in British Columbia, Canada

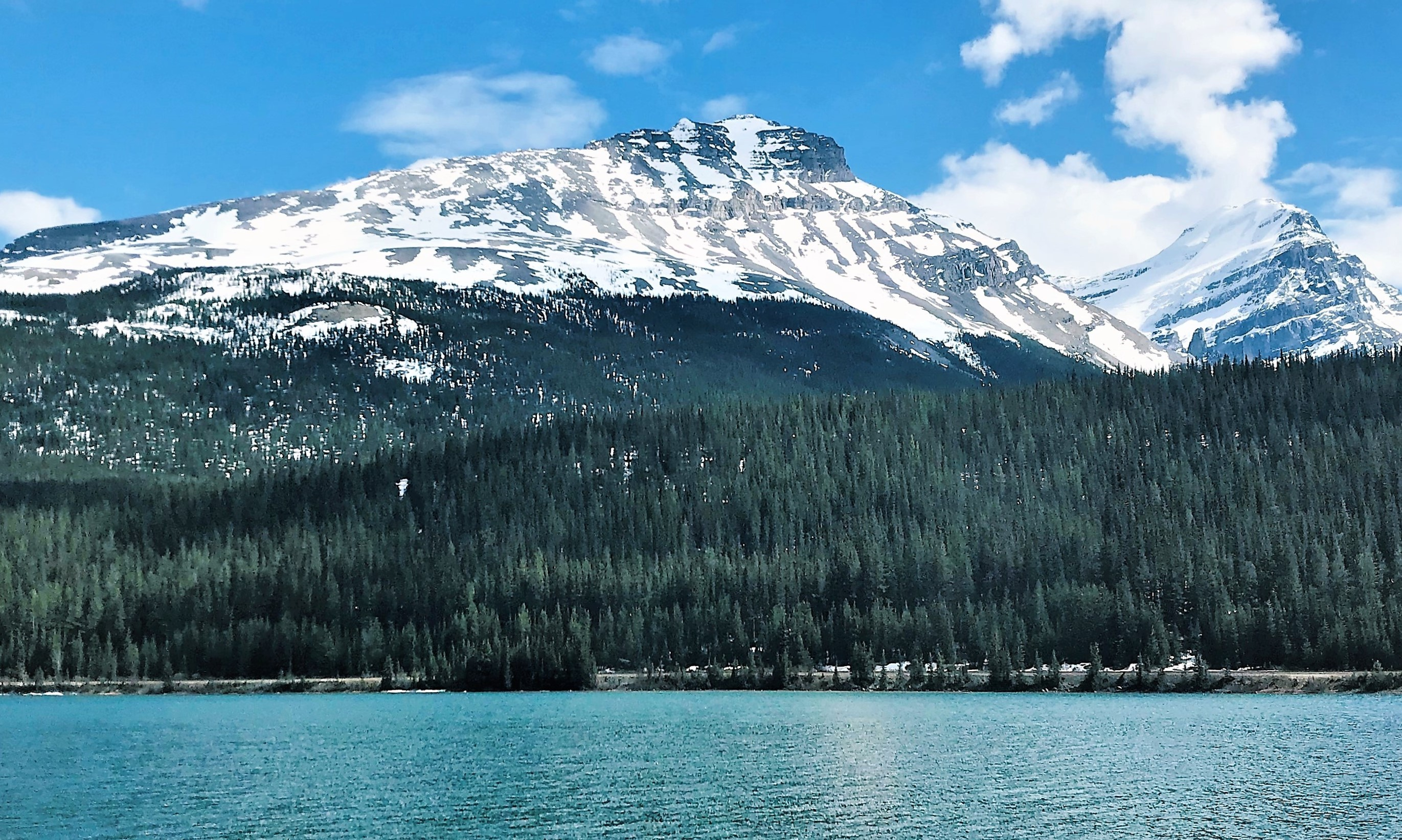
- Northwest aspect, from Wapta Lake. (Mount Victoria to the right.)

Highest point
- Elevation: 2,974 m (9,757 ft)
- Prominence: 108 m (354 ft)
- Isolation: 0.51 km (0.32 mi)
- Listing: Mountains of British Columbia
- Coordinates: 51°24′45″N 116°18′56″W

Geography
- Location within British Columbia Location within Canada
- Interactive map of Narao Peak
- Country: Canada
- Province: British Columbia
- District: Kootenay Land District
- Protected area: Yoho National Park
- Parent range: Bow Range → Canadian Rockies
- Topo map: NTS 82N8 Lake Louise

Geology
- Rock age: Cambrian
- Mountain type: Fault block
- Rock type: Sedimentary rock

Climbing
- First ascent: 1913
- Easiest route: Scrambling via North ridge

Narao Peak is a 2,974-metre (9,757-foot) summit located in British Columbia, Canada.

== Description ==
Narao Peak is situated immediately south-southwest of Kicking Horse Pass and within Yoho National Park. It is part of the Bow Range which is a subrange of the Canadian Rockies. Topographic relief is significant as the summit rises 1,240 meters (4,070 ft) above the Narao Lakes in 2 km (1.2 mi). The nearest higher neighbor is Popes Peak, 1.61 km (1.00 mi) to the southeast on the Continental Divide. Precipitation runoff from Narao Peak drains into tributaries of the Kicking Horse River. The peak is visible from Highway 1 (the Trans-Canada Highway), and tourists en route to Lake O'Hara pass below the western base of the mountain.

== History ==
The first ascent of the summit was made in 1913 by the Interprovincial Boundary Survey which subsequently applied the toponym in 1916 based on the name given to the mountain by Samuel E.S. Allen. Samuel Evans Stokes Allen was a cartographer who mapped this area of the Rockies in the late 1800s and named many peaks. Mount Allen was named after him.

The word "narao" translated from the Stoney language means "hit in the stomach", which may be related to an incident during the 1858 Palliser expedition when a spooked horse kicked James Hector unconscious near here, which also led to the name of Kicking Horse Pass.

The mountain's toponym was officially adopted April 3, 1952, by the Geographical Names Board of Canada.

== Geology ==
Narao Peak is composed of sedimentary rock laid down during the Precambrian to Jurassic periods. Formed in shallow seas, this sedimentary rock was pushed east and over the top of younger rock during the Laramide orogeny.

== Climate ==
Based on the Köppen climate classification, Narao Peak is located in a subarctic climate zone with cold, snowy winters, and mild summers. Temperatures can drop below −20 °C (−4 °F) with wind chill factors below −30 °C (−22 °F).

== Gallery ==
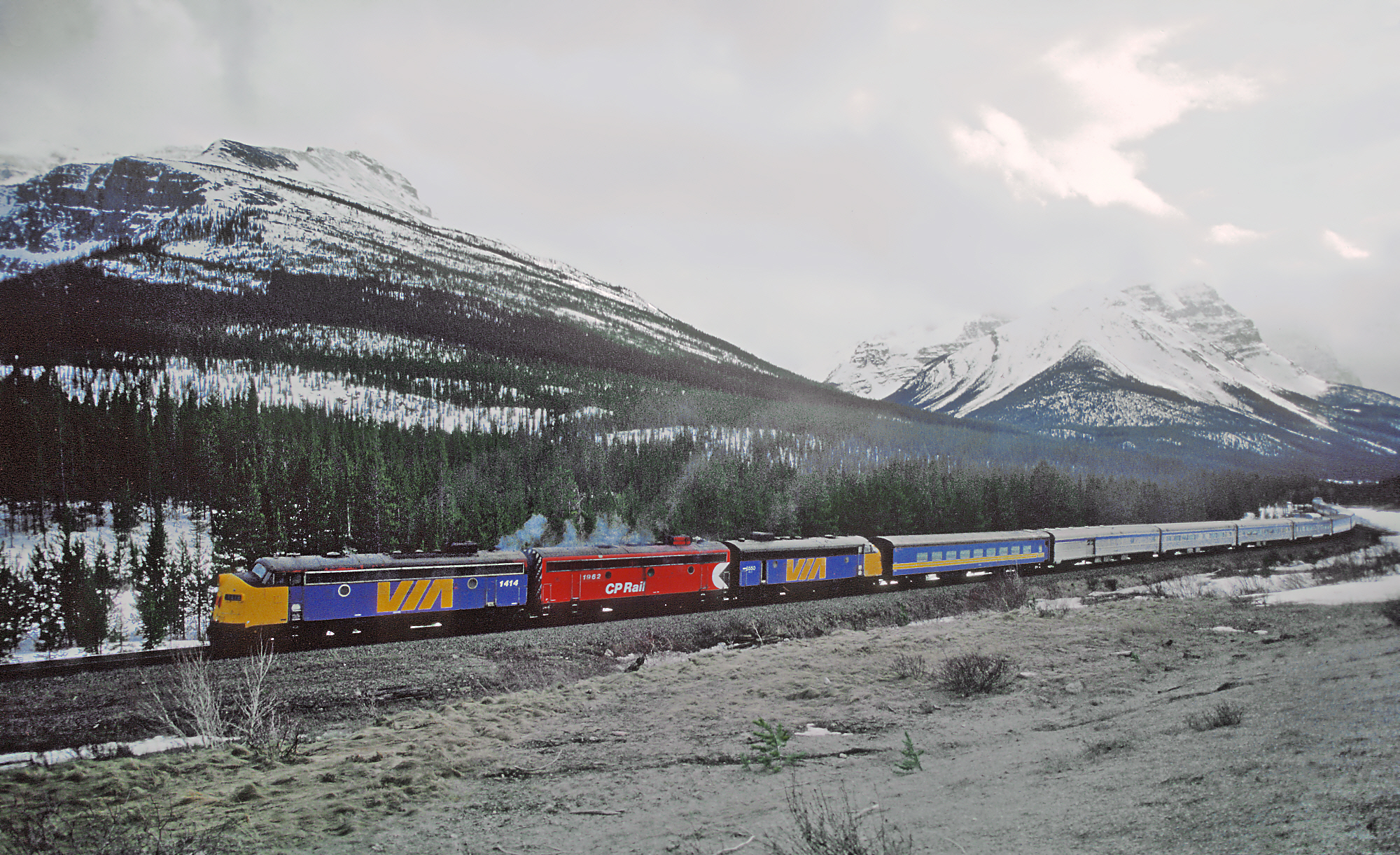
Narao Peak in upper left corner

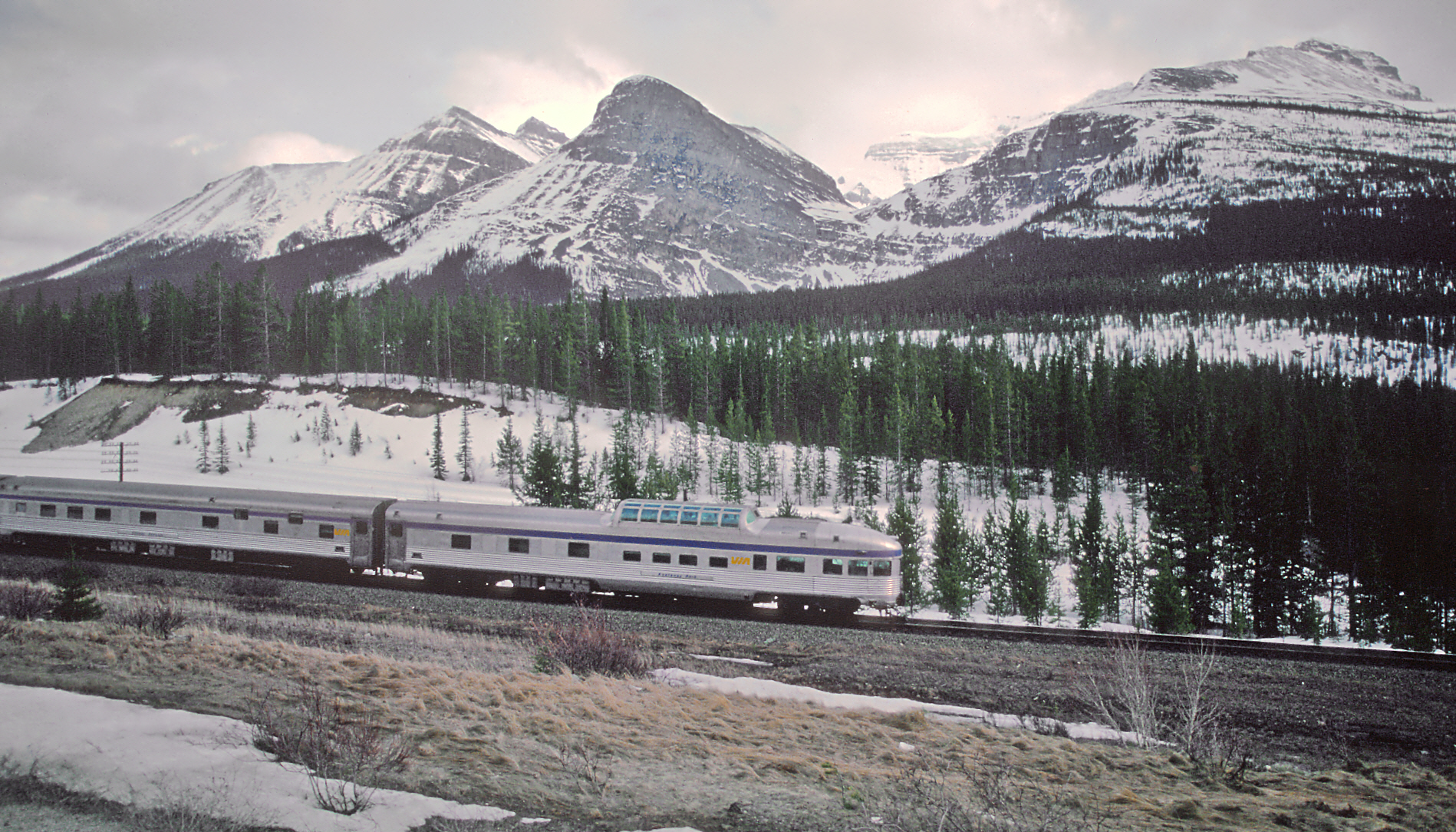
Narao Peak in upper right corner

== See also ==
- Geography of British Columbia
