= Glacier Peak (Bow Range) =

Mountain in Alberta and British Columbia, Canada

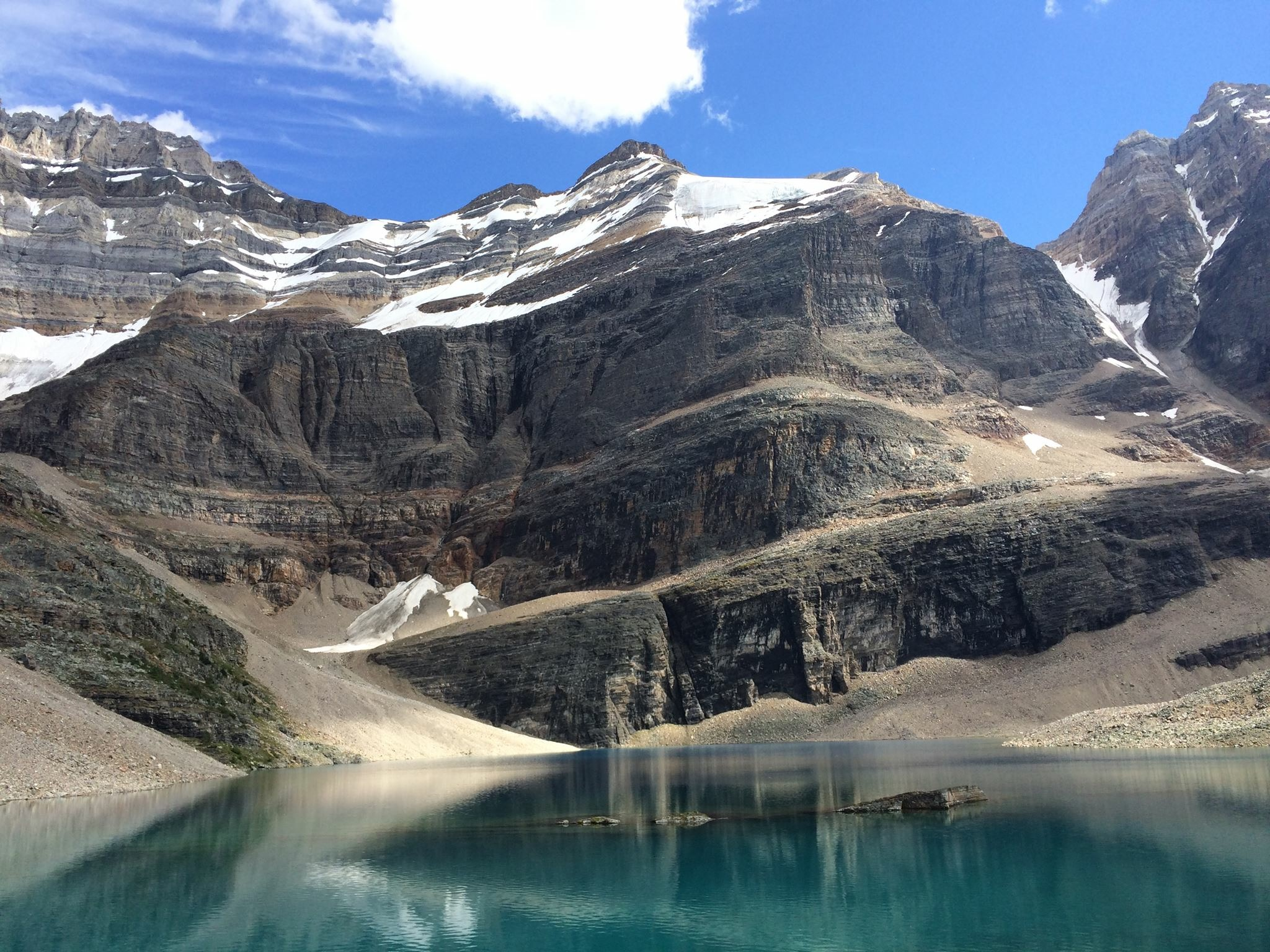
- Glacier Peak (centered) with Mount Lefroy in upper left and Ringrose Peak in upper right as seen from Lake Oesa

Highest point
- Elevation: 3,302 m (10,833 ft)
- Prominence: 72 m (236 ft)
- Listing: Mountains of Alberta; Mountains of British Columbia
- Coordinates: 51°21′03″N 116°17′04″W

Geography
- Location within Alberta Location within British Columbia Location within Canada
- Country: Canada
- Provinces: Alberta and British Columbia
- Protected area: Banff National Park
- Parent range: Bow Range
- Topo map: NTS 82N8 Lake Louise

Climbing
- First ascent: 1909 V. Fynn; A. Hart; C. Richardson; L. Wilson

Glacier Peak is a mountain in Banff National Park and straddles the Continental Divide marking the Alberta-British Columbia border. It is situated between Mount Lefroy and Ringrose Peak in the Bow Range of the Canadian Rockies. It was named in 1894 by Samuel E.S. Allen in reference to the glacier on the northern side of the mountain.

== Geology ==
Glacier Peak is composed of sedimentary rock laid down during the Precambrian to Jurassic periods. Formed in shallow seas, this sedimentary rock was pushed east and over the top of younger rock during the Laramide orogeny.

== Climate ==
Based on the Köppen climate classification, Glacier Peak is located in a subarctic climate zone with cold, snowy winters, and mild summers. Temperatures can drop below −20 °C with wind chill factors below −30 °C.

== Gallery ==
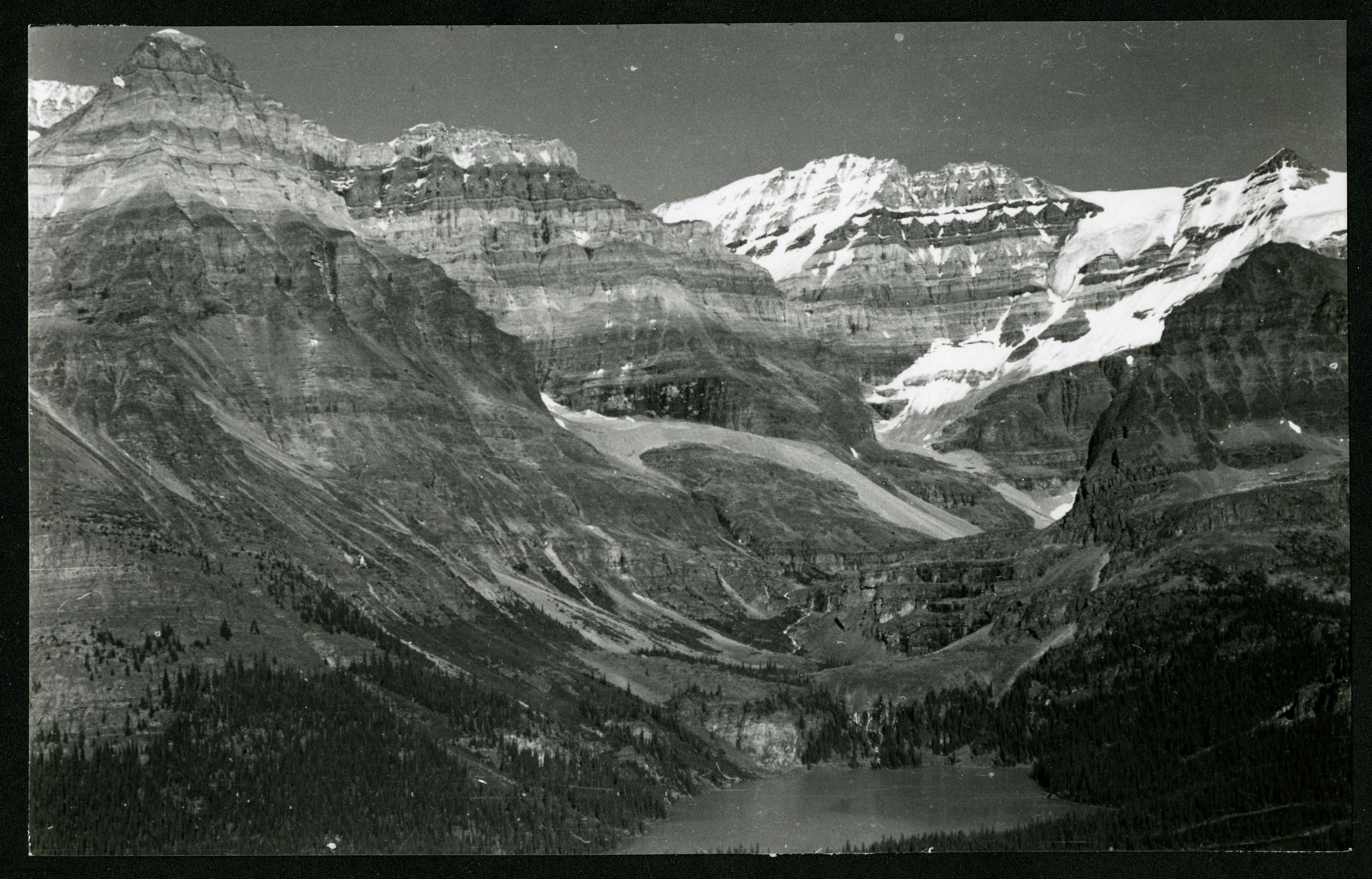
Glacier Peak in upper right corner

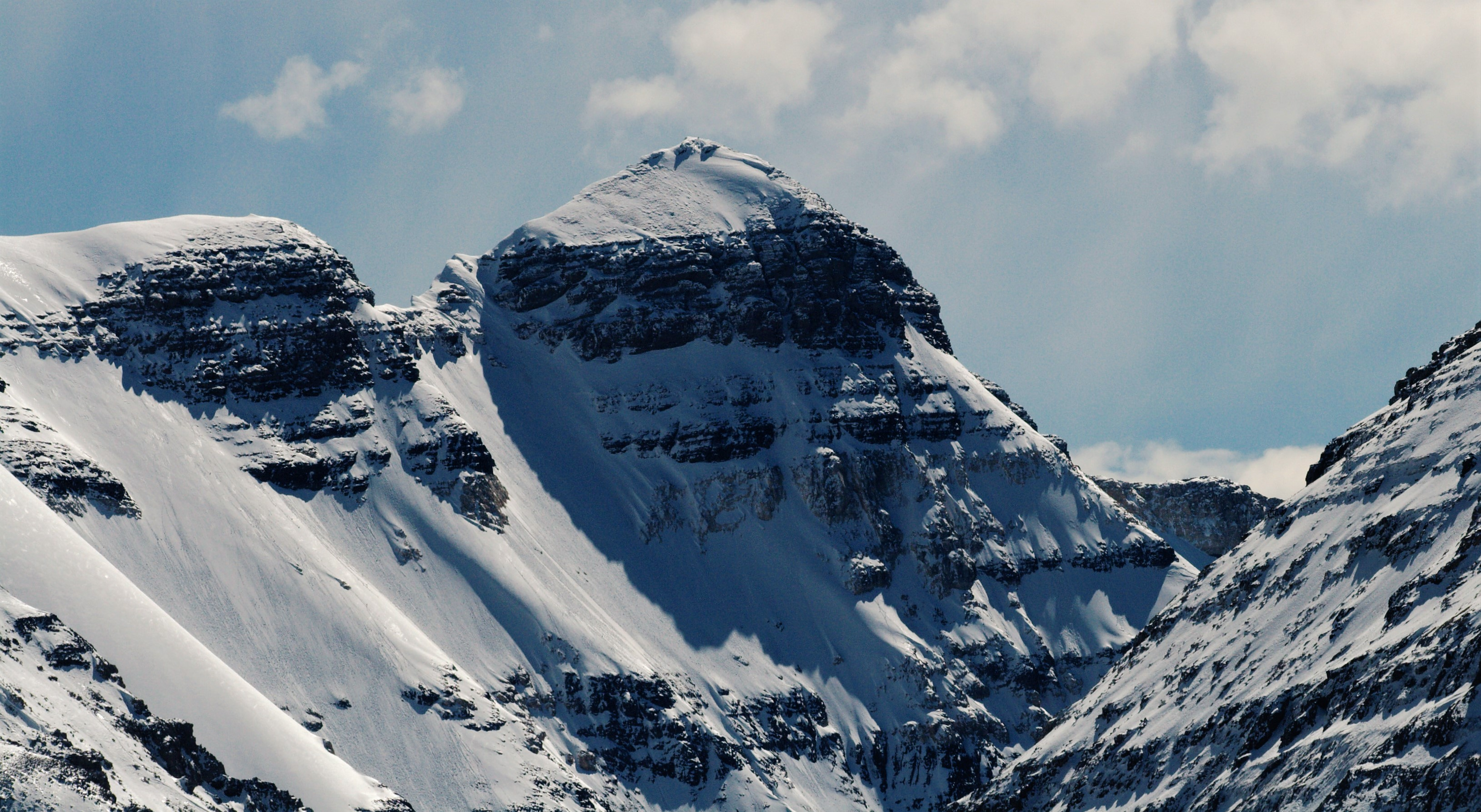
Glacier Peak, north aspect

== See also ==
- List of mountains in the Canadian Rockies
- List of peaks on the British Columbia–Alberta border
