= Yukness Mountain =

Mountain in Yoho NP, BC, Canada

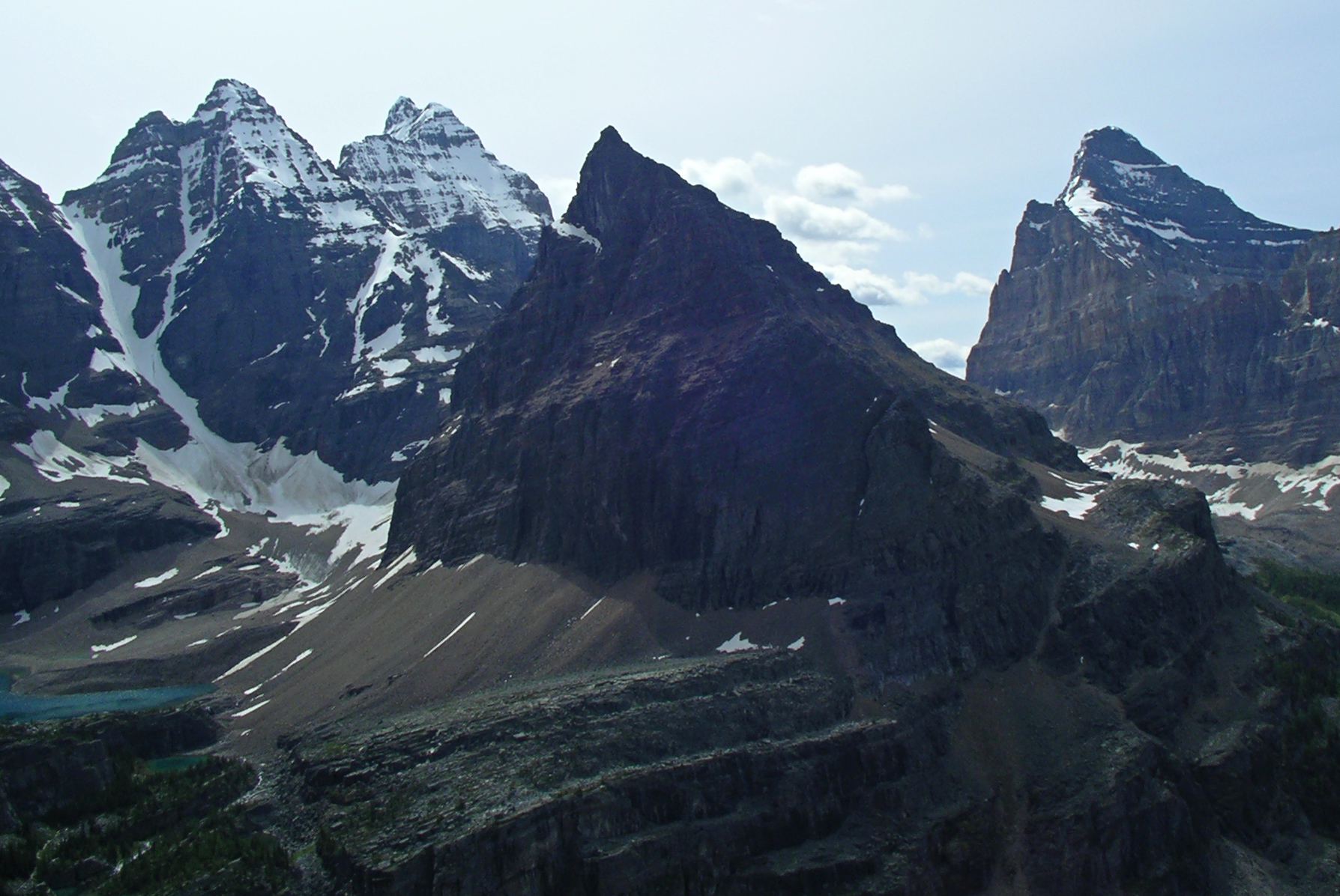
- Yukness Mountain (center) with Ringrose and Hungabee to left and Biddle to right

Highest point
- Elevation: 2,851 m (9,354 ft) (Note: Other sources state 2847 m.)
- Prominence: 161 m (528 ft)
- Parent peak: Ringrose Peak (3292 m)
- Listing: Mountains of British Columbia
- Coordinates: 51°20′41″N 116°18′18″W

Geography
- Location within British Columbia Location within Canada
- Interactive map of Yukness Mountain
- Country: Canada
- Province: British Columbia
- District: Kootenay Land District
- Protected area: Yoho National Park
- Parent range: Bow Range ← Canadian Rockies
- Topo map: NTS 82N8 Lake Louise

Geology
- Rock age: Cambrian
- Rock type: sedimentary rock

Climbing
- First ascent: 1918 Survey Party
- Easiest route: Scramble

Yukness Mountain is a 2,851-metre (9,354-foot) summit located southeast of Lake O'Hara in the Bow Range of Yoho National Park, in the Canadian Rockies of British Columbia, Canada. Its nearest higher peak is Ringrose Peak, 1.0 km (0.62 mi) to the east.

== History ==
In 1894 Samuel E.S. Allen named it "yukness" for the Stoney language expression for "sharpened with a knife" because it does appear as a knife-edge peak when viewed from Lake O'Hara.

Walter Wilcox wrote about Lake O'Hara and Yukness Mountain:

"Soon we came upon the western end of as beautiful a lake as I have ever seen. While showing neither glaciers nor snow upon the immediate peaks, the immense walls to the left and the cliffs and ideally pyramidal peak to the right formed a foreground of wonderful grandeur. The northwest end on which we stood fringed the emerald water with a growth of pine. The south east end facing us was encircled with cliffs five hundred feet in height, from whose summit, piled high with the rocks of an old moraine, three slender waterfalls leaped into the lake. This lake, about a mile in length and slightly less in width, I have known as Lake O'Hara. Ascending the cliffs upon our left by a gully we reached the glacial dam. The bed of an ancient glacier behind this is occupied by a very small lake, at the base of the sharp peak of which I spoke, and which I called by the Indian equivalent, Yukness."

The first ascent of the mountain was made in 1918 by a survey party.

The mountain's name was made official in 1952 by the Geographical Names Board of Canada after it had been incorrectly changed to Mount Yukness.

== Geology ==
Yukness Mountain is composed of sedimentary rock laid down during the Precambrian to Jurassic periods. Formed in shallow seas, this sedimentary rock was pushed east and over the top of younger rock during the Laramide orogeny.

== Climate ==
Based on the Köppen climate classification, Yukness Mountain is located in a subarctic climate zone with cold, snowy winters, and mild summers. Temperatures can drop below −20 °C (−4 °F) with wind chill factors below −30 °C (−22 °F). Precipitation runoff from Yukness Mountain drains into Lake O'Hara, thence into the Kicking Horse River which is a tributary of the Columbia River.

== Gallery ==
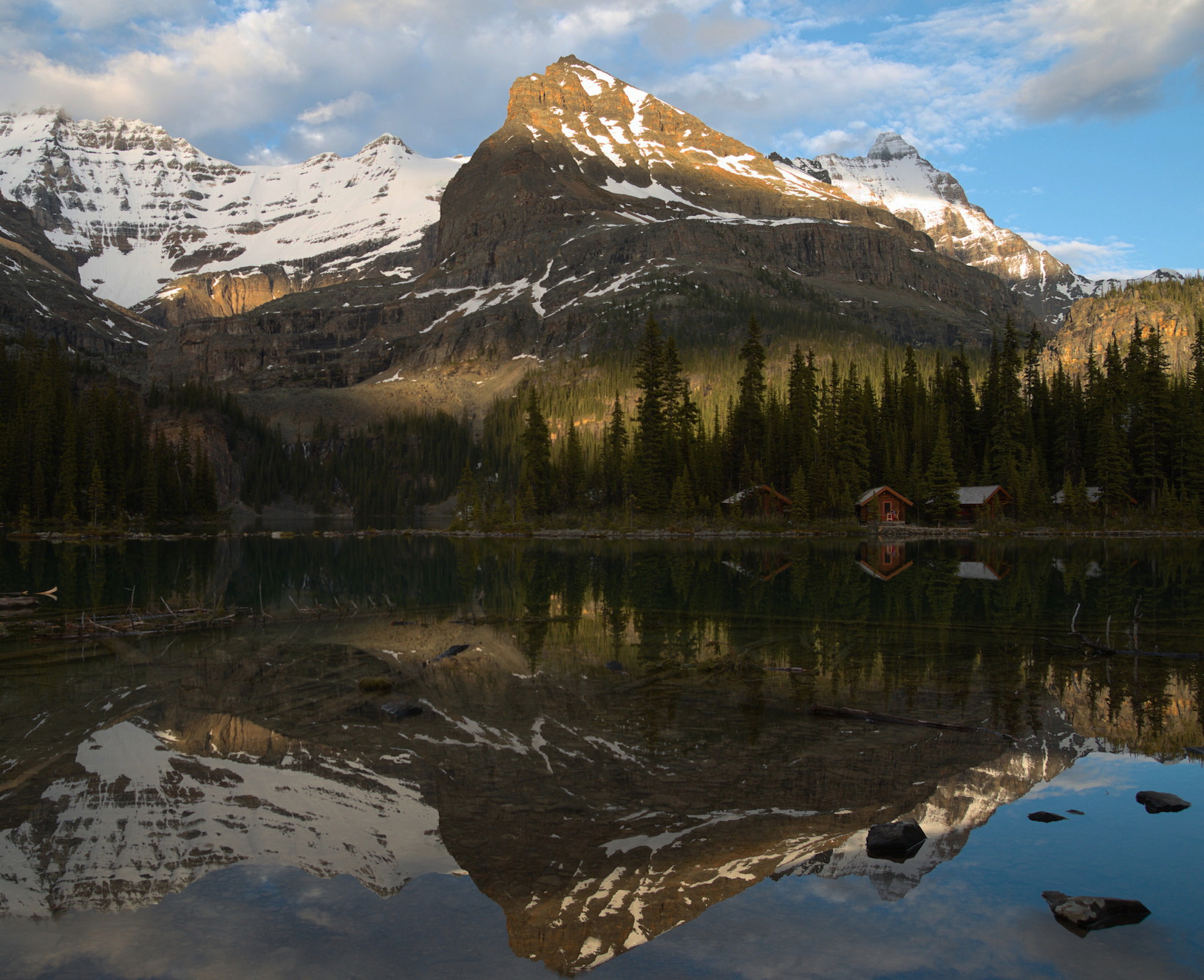
Yukness Mountain reflected in Lake O'Hara

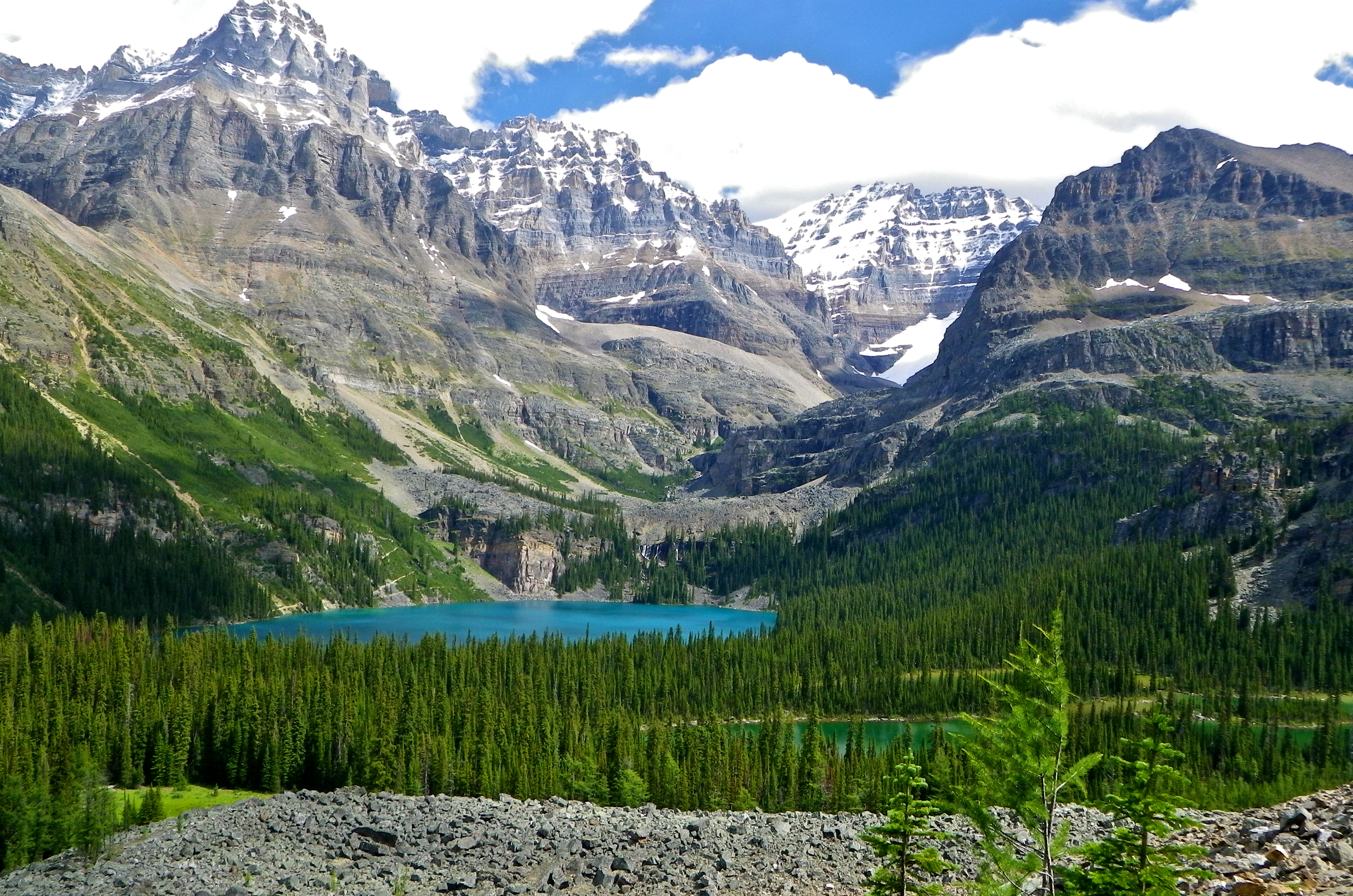
Lake O'Hara with Yukness to right

== See also ==
- Geography of British Columbia
