= Collier Peak =

Mountain on Alberta/British Columbia border in Canada

- Location within Alberta Location within British Columbia Location within Canada

Highest point
- Elevation: 3,232 m (10,604 ft) (Note: Other sources state 3215 m.)
- Prominence: 94 m (308 ft)
- Listing: Mountains of Alberta; Mountains of British Columbia
- Coordinates: 51°23′27″N 116°18′12″W

Geography
- Country: Canada
- Provinces: Alberta and British Columbia
- Parent range: Bow Range
- Topo map: NTS 82N8 Lake Louise

Climbing
- First ascent: 1893 H.P. Nichols, Samuel E.S. Allen

Collier Peak is located between Mount Victoria and Popes Peak and straddles the Continental Divide marking the Alberta-British Columbia border. It was named in 1903 after Dr. Joseph Collier.

== See also ==
- List of peaks on the Alberta–British Columbia border
