= Boom Mountain =

Mountain on Alberta/British Columbia border in Canada

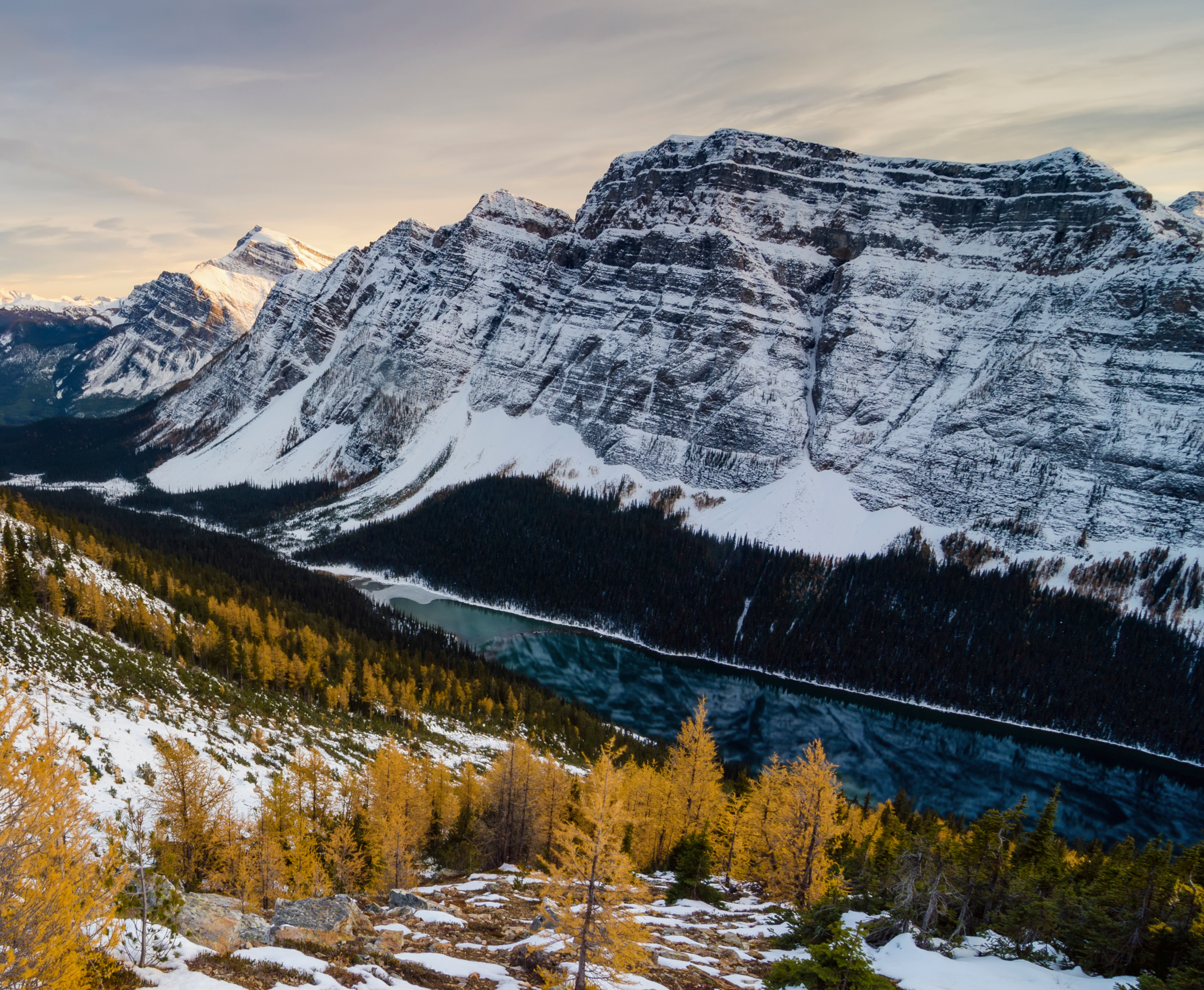
- Boom Mountain and Boom Lake

Highest point
- Elevation: 2,760 m (9,060 ft)
- Prominence: 458 m (1,503 ft)
- Listing: Mountains of Alberta; Mountains of British Columbia
- Coordinates: 51°15′03″N 116°04′43″W

Geography
- Location within Alberta Location within British Columbia Location within Canada
- Country: Canada
- Provinces: Alberta and British Columbia
- Protected area: Banff National Park
- Parent range: Bow Range; Canadian Rockies
- Topo map: NTS 82N8 Lake Louise

Geology
- Rock age: Cambrian
- Rock type: Sedimentary rock

Climbing
- First ascent: 1903 Dominion Survey Party

Boom Mountain is located north of Vermilion Pass and straddles the Continental Divide marking the Alberta-British Columbia border. It was named in 1908 after Boom Lake which is located right under the mountain. When viewed by an Alpine Club of Canada expedition, a buildup of logs on the lake resembled a log boom.

== Geology ==
Boom Mountain is composed of sedimentary rock laid down from the Precambrian to Jurassic periods. Formed in shallow seas, this sedimentary rock was pushed east and over the top of younger rock during the Laramide orogeny.

== Climate ==
Based on the Köppen climate classification, Boom Mountain is located in a subarctic climate with cold, snowy winters, and mild summers. Temperatures can drop below −20 °C (−4 °F) with wind chill factors below −30 °C (−22 °F).

== Gallery ==
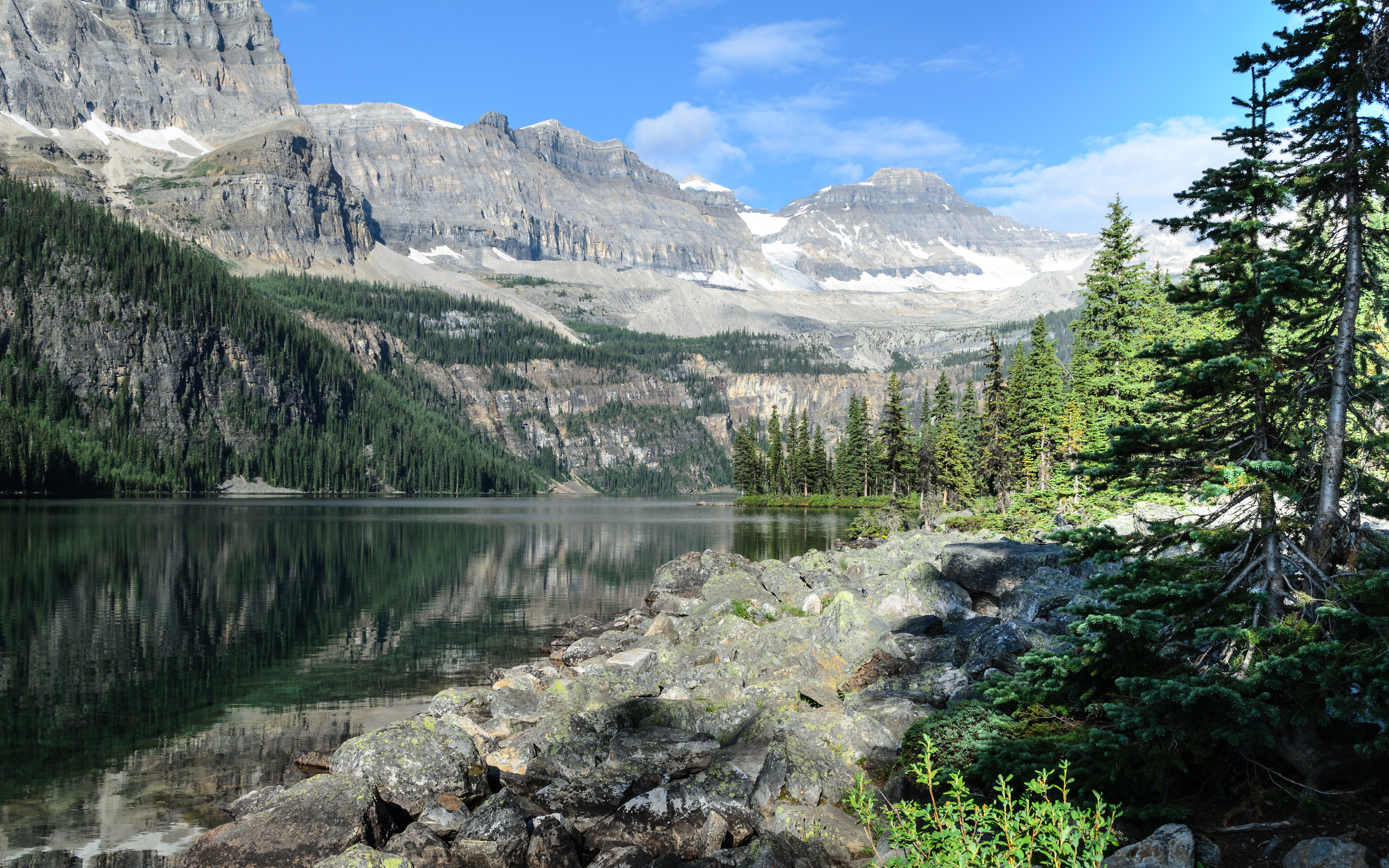
Boom Lake in Banff National Park. (A part of Boom Mountain in upper left corner of frame)

== See also ==
- List of peaks on the Alberta–British Columbia border
