= Mount Little =

Mountain peak in Canada

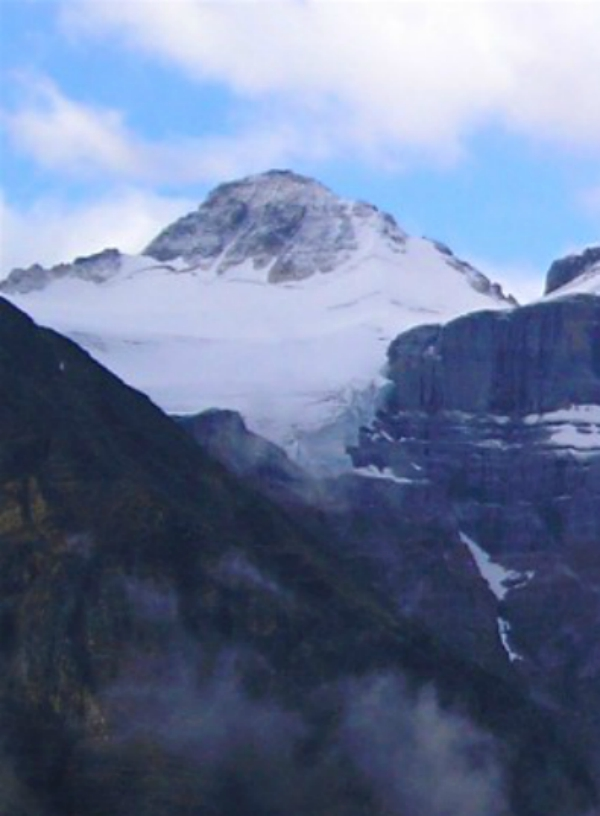
- Mount Little and Fay Glacier

Highest point
- Elevation: 3,134 m (10,282 ft) (Note: Other sources state 3088 m.)
- Prominence: 164 m (538 ft)
- Parent peak: Mount Fay (3234 m)
- Listing: Mountains of Alberta; Mountains of British Columbia
- Coordinates: 51°17′45″N 116°10′58″W

Geography
- Location within Alberta Location within British Columbia Location within Canada
- Country: Canada
- Provinces: Alberta and British Columbia
- District: Kootenay Land District
- Protected areas: Banff National Park; Kootenay National Park
- Parent range: Bow Range
- Topo map: NTS 82N8 Lake Louise

Climbing
- First ascent: 1901 G.T. Little, Charles S. Thompson, G.M. Weed, Christian Kaufmann
- Easiest route: North-West Ridge I

Mount Little is situated at the northern end of Kootenay National Park, and straddles the Continental Divide marking the Alberta-British Columbia border. It was named in 1916 after George F. Little, a member of the first ascent party.

== See also ==
- List of peaks on the Alberta–British Columbia border
- List of mountains in the Canadian Rockies
