= Bow Range =

Subrange of the Park Ranges in Alberta and British Columbia, Canada

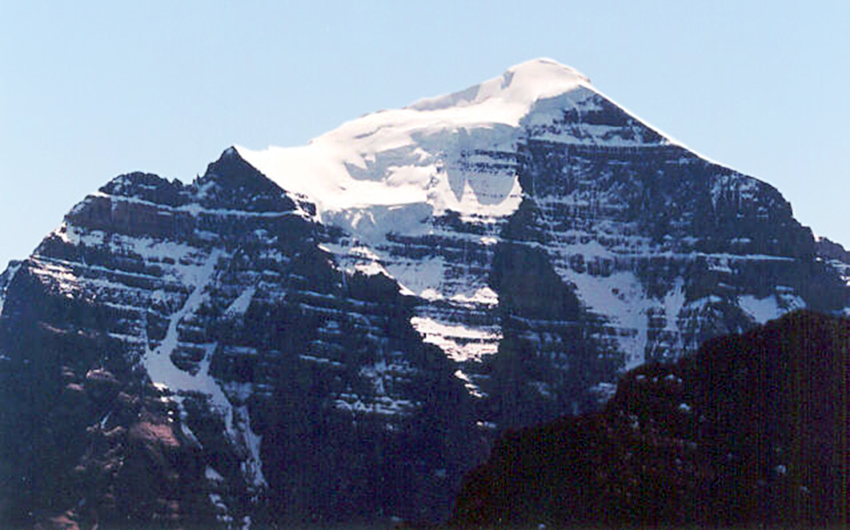
- North face of Mount Temple

Highest point
- Peak: Mount Temple, Alberta
- Elevation: 3,543 m (11,624 ft)
- Listing: Mountains of Alberta
- Coordinates: 51°21′02″N 116°12′24″W

Dimensions
- Length: 34 km (21 mi) N-S
- Width: 43 km (27 mi)
- Area: 717 km^{2} (277 mi^{2})

Geography
- Location within Alberta Location within British Columbia
- Country: Canada
- Provinces: Alberta and British Columbia
- Protected areas: Banff National Park; Kootenay National Park
- Range coordinates: 51°20′00″N 116°17′00″W
- Parent range: Canadian Rockies (Southern Continental Ranges)
- Borders on: Waputik Range, Slate Range, Ball Range and Ottertail Range

The Bow Range is a mountain range of the Park Ranges in Alberta and British Columbia, Canada. The range is named in association with the Bow River and was officially adopted on March 31, 1917 by the Geographic Board of Canada.

It is a part of the Banff-Lake Louise Core Area of the Southern Continental Ranges, located on the Continental Divide, west of the Bow River valley, in Banff National Park and Kootenay National Park.

The Bow Range covers a surface area of 717 km^{2} (277 sq mi), has a length of 34 km (from north to south) and a maximum width of 43 km. The highest peak is Mount Temple, with an elevation of 3,543 m (11,624 ft). The range also covers the Valley of the Ten Peaks, with the tallest of the ten being Mount Hungabee at 3492 metres. The range also has hiking areas such as the Consolation Lakes, Sentinel Pass-Larch Valley, Wenkchenma Pass-Eiffel Lake, the Beehive plain of the Six Glaciers system and Saddle Back Pass.

== Peaks and mountains ==
Rank	Mountain / Peak	Elevation		Prominence		FA	Coordinates	Easiest route
Rank	Mountain / Peak	m	ft	m	ft	FA	Coordinates	Easiest route
1	Mount Temple	3,543	11,624	1,544	5,066	1894	51°21′2″N 116°12′24″W	Moderate scramble on SW face
2	Hungabee Mountain	3,492	11,457	987	3,238	1903	51°19′58″N 116°17′2″W	UIAA III 5.4 on West ridge
3	Mount Victoria	3,464	11,365	547	1,795	1897	51°22′37″N 116°18′24″W	UIAA II on SE ridge, South Summit
4	Deltaform Mountain	3,424	11,234	822	2,697	1903	51°18′6″N 116°14′43″W	UIAA II 5.5 on NW ridge
5	Mount Lefroy	3,423	11,230	417	1,368	1897	51°21′44″N 116°16′47″W	UIAA II on West face
6	Mount Huber	3,348	10,984	158	518	1903	51°22′13″N 116°18′44″W	
7	Mount Biddle	3,320	10,890	731	2,398	1903	51°19′24″N 116°18′26″W	
8	Mount Allen	3,310	10,860	260	850	1904	51°17′33″N 116°13′12″W	
9	Glacier Peak	3,302	10,833	72	236	1909	51°21′2″N 116°17′1″W	
10	Ringrose Peak	3,292	10,801	137	449	1909	51°20′34″N 116°17′28″W	
11	Mount Tuzo	3,246	10,650	210	690	1906	51°18′6″N 116°13′42″W	
12	Neptuak Mountain	3,241	10,633	151	495	1902	51°18′29″N 116°15′28″W	
13	Mount Fay	3,235	10,614	389	1,276	1904	51°17′58″N 116°9′43″W	
14	Collier Peak	3,232	10,604	94	308	1893	51°23′27″N 116°18′12″W	
15	Wenkchemna Peak	3,206	10,518	16	52	1923	51°19′43″N 116°16′35″W	
16	Quadra Mountain	3,173	10,410	285	935	1910	51°17′13″N 116°9′12″W	
17	Popes Peak	3,163	10,377	81	266	1903	51°24′8″N 116°17′40″W	
18	Mount Aberdeen	3,152	10,341	566	1,857	1894	51°22′48″N 116°14′51″W	
19	Odaray Mountain	3,137	10,292	627	2,057	1887	51°21′37″N 116°23′3″W	
20	Mount Little	3,134	10,282	164	538	1916	51°17′45″N 116°10′58″W	
21	Mount Babel	3,103	10,180	200	660	1910	51°18′23″N 116°9′48″W	UIAA IV 5.10 A1 on East face
22	Bident Mountain	3,088	10,131	103	338	1903	51°17′15″N 116°8′28″W	
23	Mount Owen	3,083	10,115	903	2,963	1892	51°18′58″N 116°25′13″W	
24	Eiffel Peak	3,077	10,095	465	1,526	1901	51°19′56″N 116°14′7″W	Scramble
25	Mount Bowlen	3,072	10,079	170	560	1901	51°18′6″N 116°11′22″W	
26	Haddo Peak	3,070	10,070	83	272	1903	51°23′0″N 116°14′12″W	
26	Pinnacle Mountain	3,070	10,070	225	738	1909	51°20′20″N 116°13′39″W	
28	Mount Perren	3,051	10,010	113	371	1927	51°17′47″N 116°12′32″W	
29	Chimney Peak	3,001	9,846	137	449	1910	51°15′52″N 116°9′19″W	
30	Mount Whyte	2,983	9,787	140	460	1901	51°24′31″N 116°16′16″W	Difficult scramble or Perren Route II 5.6
31	Mount Niblock	2,976	9,764	142	466	1899	51°25′3″N 116°16′16″W	Moderate scramble
32	Narao Peak	2,974	9,757	90	300	1913	51°24′45″N 116°18′56″W	Moderate scramble
33	Mount Bell	2,910	9,550	445	1,460	1910	51°17′3″N 116°6′4″W	Moderate scramble
34	Yukness Mountain	2,851	9,354	161	528	1918	51°20′41″N 116°18′18″W	Scramble (South peak)
35	The Mitre	2,850	9,350	229	751	1901	51°21′48″N 116°15′44″W	
36	Mount Whymper	2,845	9,334	263	863	1901	51°13′27″N 116°5′54″W	Moderate scramble
37	Boom Mountain	2,760	9,060	458	1,503	1903	51°15′4″N 116°4′43″W	Moderate scramble
38	Fairview Mountain	2,744	9,003	275	902	1893	51°23′58″N 116°13′24″W	Easy scramble above Lake Louise
39	Mount Schaffer	2,691	8,829	48	157	1909	51°20′40″N 116°20′24″W	
40	Mount St. Piran	2,649	8,691	187	614	Unk	51°25′17″N 116°15′10″W	Hiking trail
41	Saddle Mountain	2,433	7,982	107	351	Unk	51°23′35″N 116°12′31″W	Hiking trail
42	Big Beehive	2,270	7,450			1891	51°24′51″N 116°14′38″W	Hiking trail

== Gallery ==
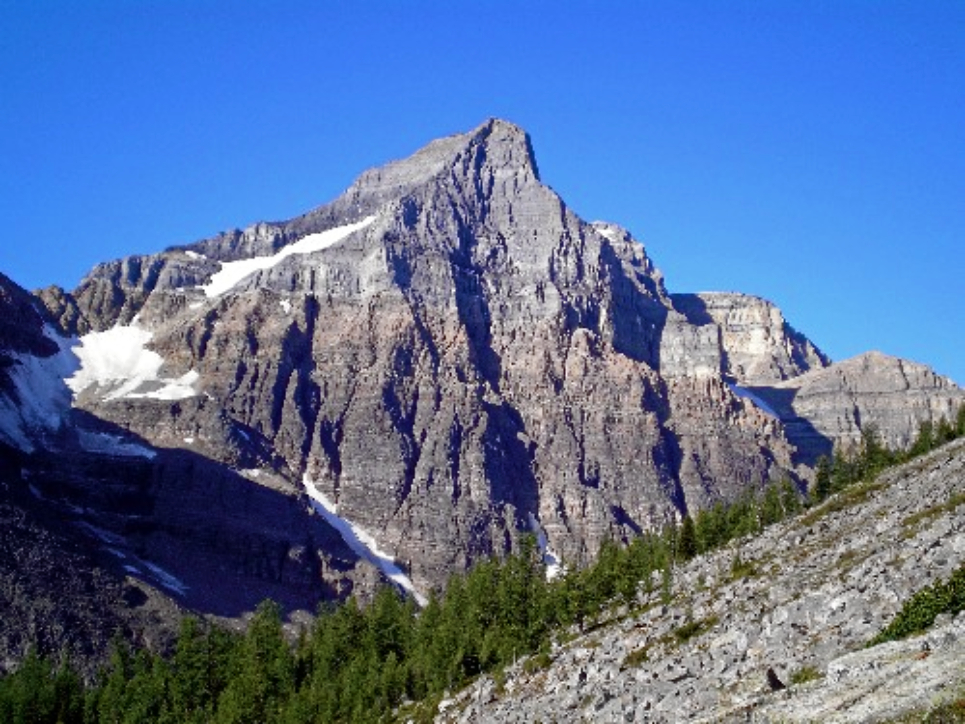
Haddo Peak

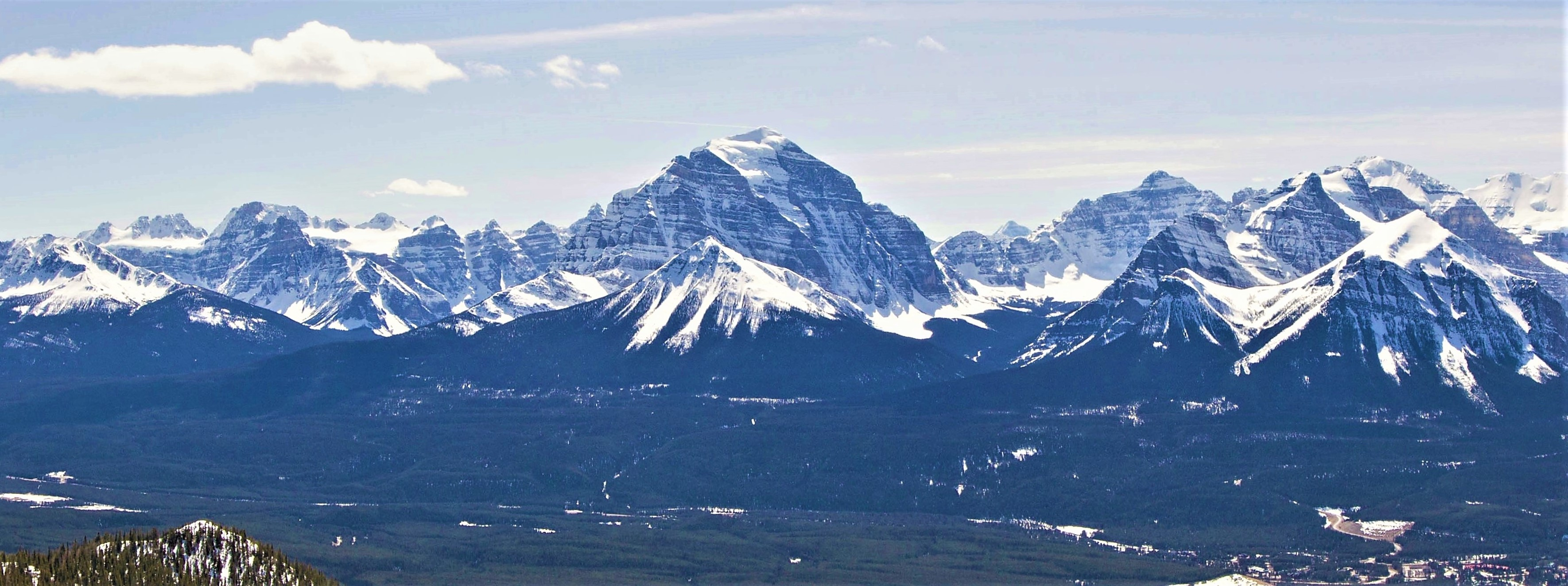
Bow Range seen from Lake Louise Ski Resort, with Mount Temple centered
