= Pinnacle Mountain (Alberta) =

Mountain in Banff NP, Canada

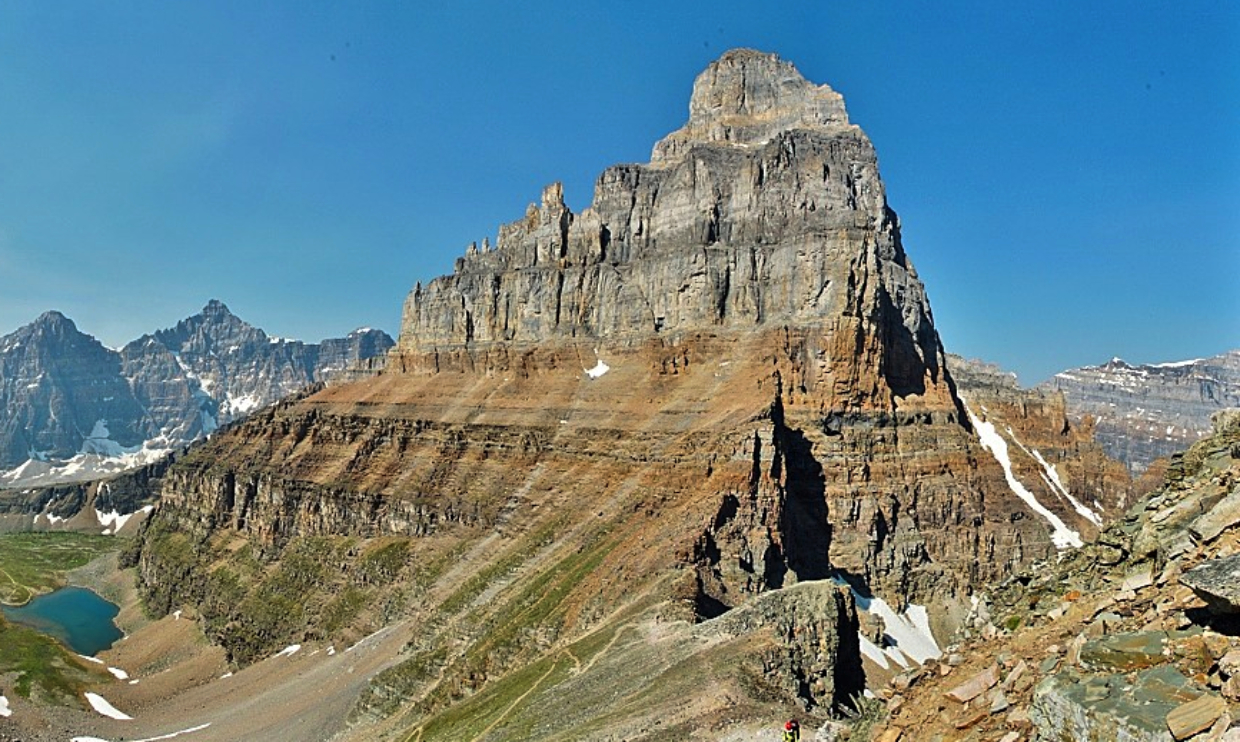
- Pinnacle Mountain

Highest point
- Elevation: 3,070 m (10,070 ft)
- Prominence: 225 m (738 ft)
- Listing: Mountains of Alberta
- Coordinates: 51°20′20″N 116°13′39″W

Geography
- Location within Alberta Location within Canada
- Interactive map of Pinnacle Mountain
- Location: Alberta
- Parent range: Bow Range; Canadian Rockies
- Topo map: NTS 82N8 Lake Louise

Geology
- Rock age: Cambrian
- Rock type: Sedimentary rock

Climbing
- First ascent: 1909 J.W.A. Hickson, E. Feuz Jr, R. Aemmer

Pinnacle Mountain is a 3,070-metre (10,070-foot) mountain summit in Banff National Park in Alberta, Canada. It's part of the Bow Range, which is a sub-range of the Canadian Rockies. The nearest higher peak is Eiffel Peak, 1.0 km (0.62 mi) to the southwest. Mount Temple is situated immediately northeast of Pinnacle Mountain, with Sentinel Pass as the low point between the two.

== History ==
The peak was named in 1894 by Walter Wilcox because of large pinnacles on the mountain near Sentinel Pass. Wilcox wrote of the pinnacles in his 1896 book, "Camping in the Canadian Rockies": "The limestone strata of this mountain were nearly perfectly horizontal, and had been sculptured by rain and frost into an endless variety of minarets, spires, and pinnacles. These, crowning the summits of ridges and slopes with ever changing angles, as though they represented alternating walls and roofs of some great cathedral, all contributed to give this mountain, with its elegant contours and outlines, the most artistically perfect assemblage of forms that nature can offer throughout the range of mountain architecture. On the north side of this mountain, as though, here, nature had striven to outdo herself, there rose from the middle slopes a number of graceful spires or pinnacles, perhaps 200 or 300 feet in height, slender and tapering, which, having escaped the irresistible force of moving glaciers and destructive earthquakes, through the duration of thousands of years, while the elements continued their slow but constant work of disintegration and dissolution, now presented these strange monuments of an ageless past."

Three previous attempts had been unsuccessful before the first ascent was made in 1909 by J. W. A. Hickson, with Edward Feuz Jr. and Rudolph Aemmer as guides.

The mountain's toponym was officially adopted in 1952 by the Geographical Names Board of Canada.

== Geology ==
Like other mountains in Banff Park, Pinnacle Mountain is composed of sedimentary rock laid down during the Precambrian to Jurassic periods. Formed in shallow seas, this sedimentary rock was pushed east and over the top of younger rock during the Laramide orogeny. The Grand Sentinel is the largest of the pinnacles located on the mountain. This quartzite tower rises 120 metres above the scree slopes on the Paradise Valley side of Sentinel Pass.

== Climate ==
Based on the Köppen climate classification, Pinnacle Mountain is located in a subarctic climate zone with cold, snowy winters, and mild summers. Winter temperatures can drop below −20 °C with wind chill factors below −30 °C.

== Gallery ==
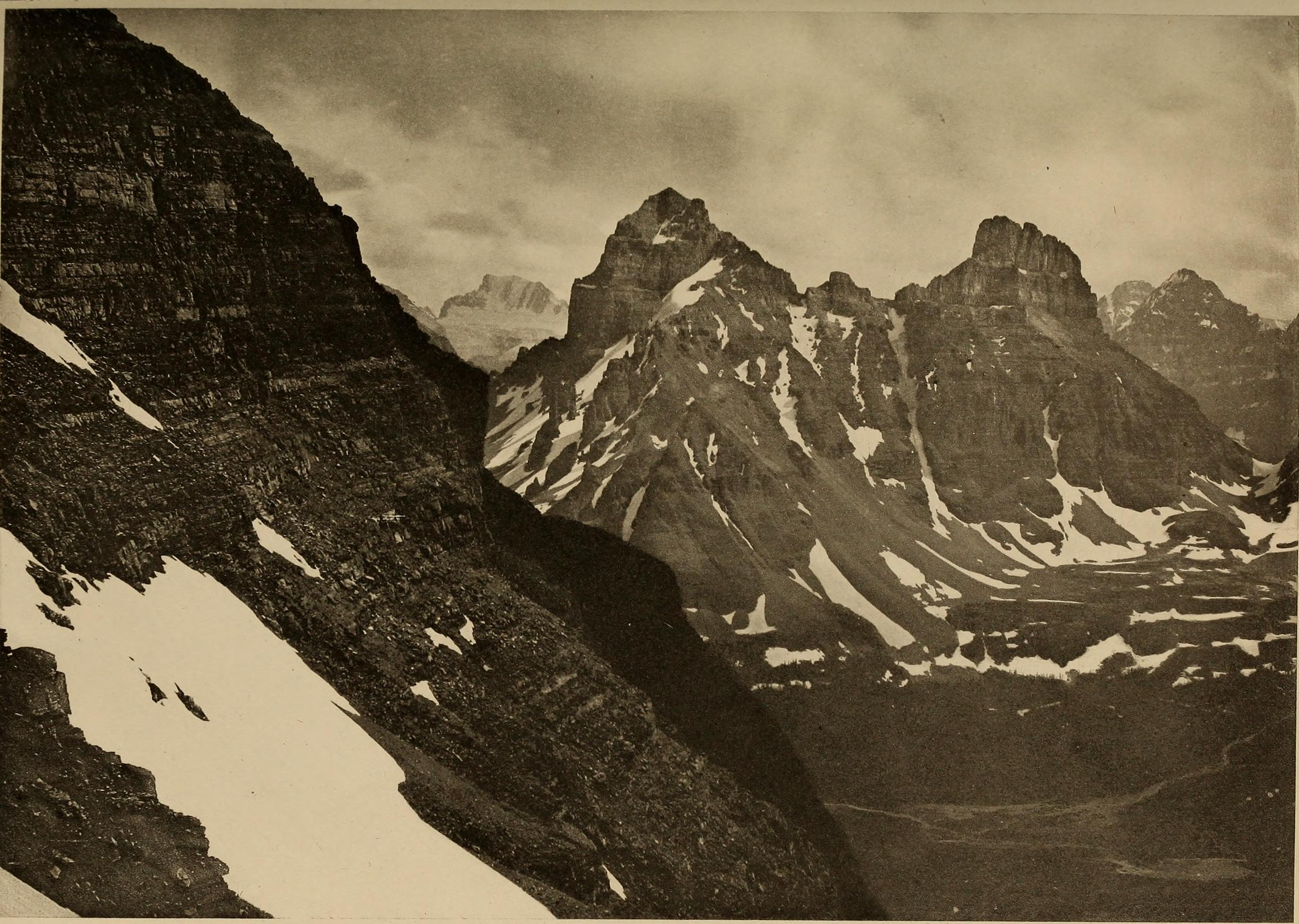
Pinnacle Mountain and Eiffel Peak photographed by Walter Wilcox from Mount Aberdeen, likely during his first ascent in 1894

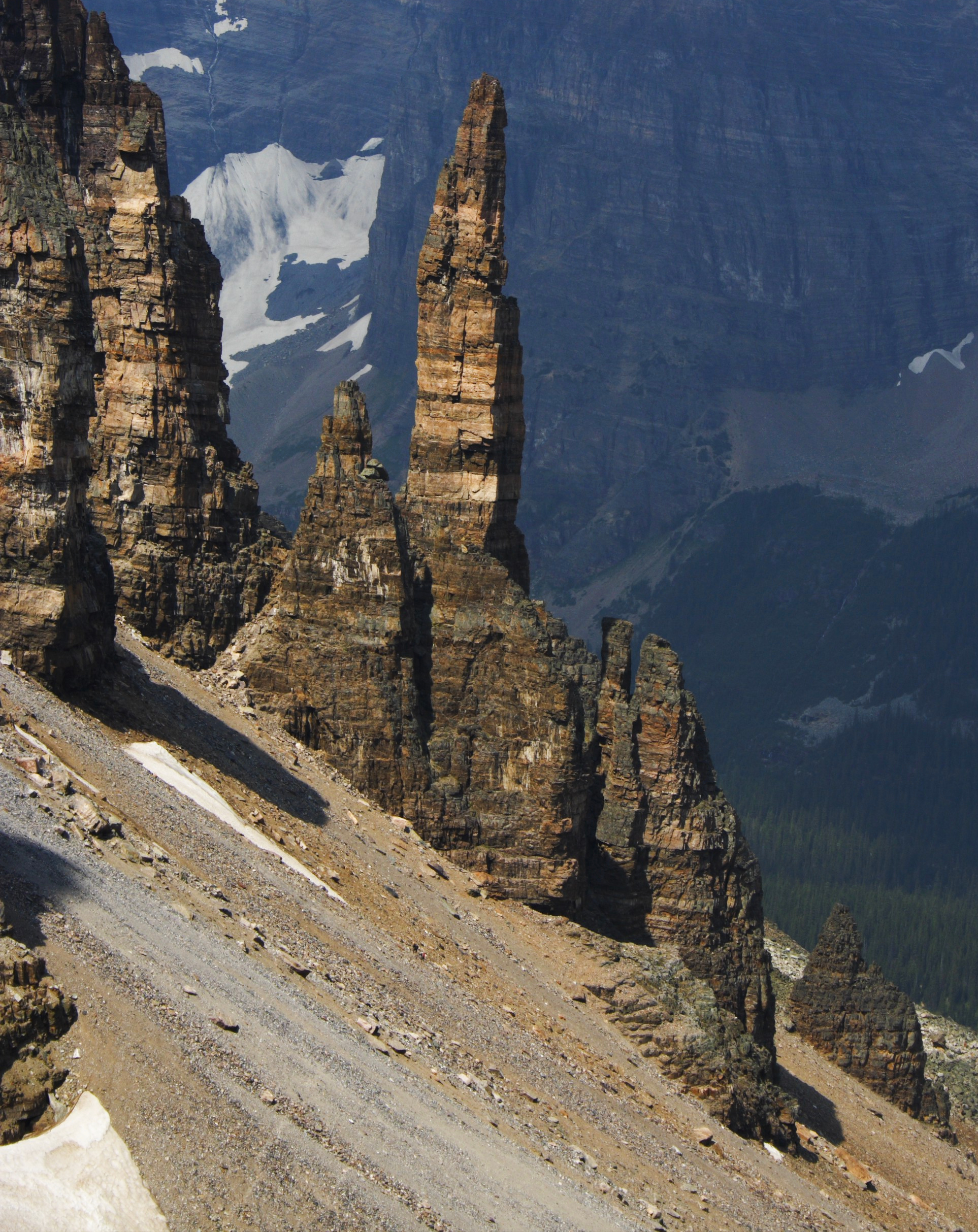
The Grand Sentinel, a quartzite pinnacle

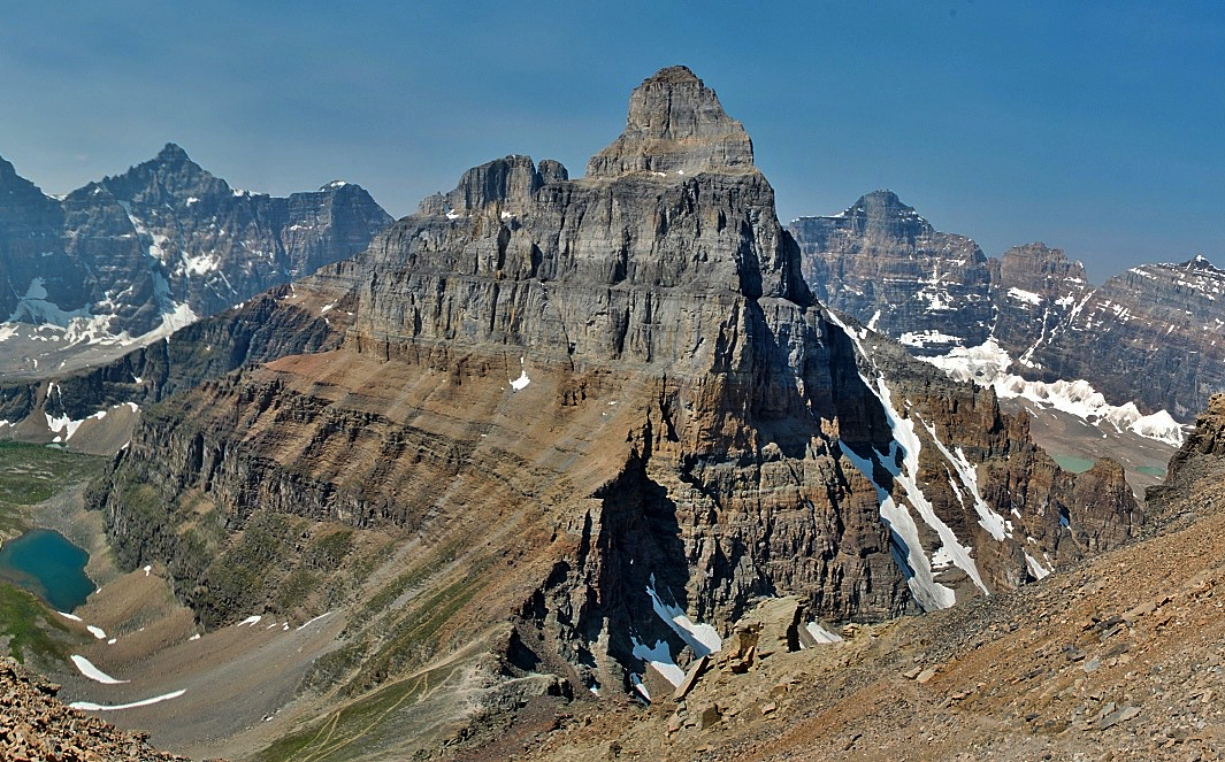
Pinnacle Mountain

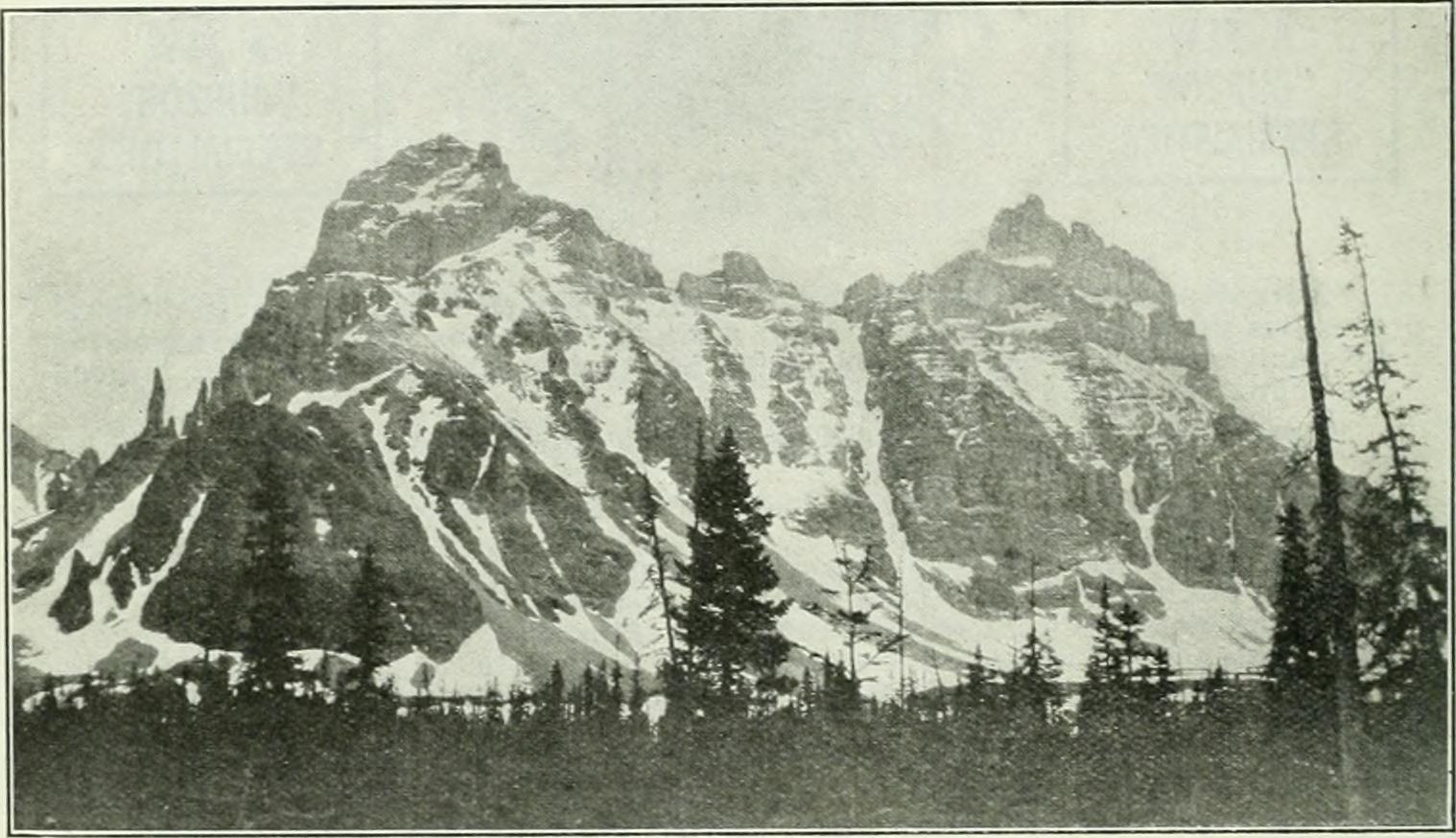
1898 image of Pinnacle Mountain (left) and Eiffel Peak (right) seen from the north at Paradise Valley

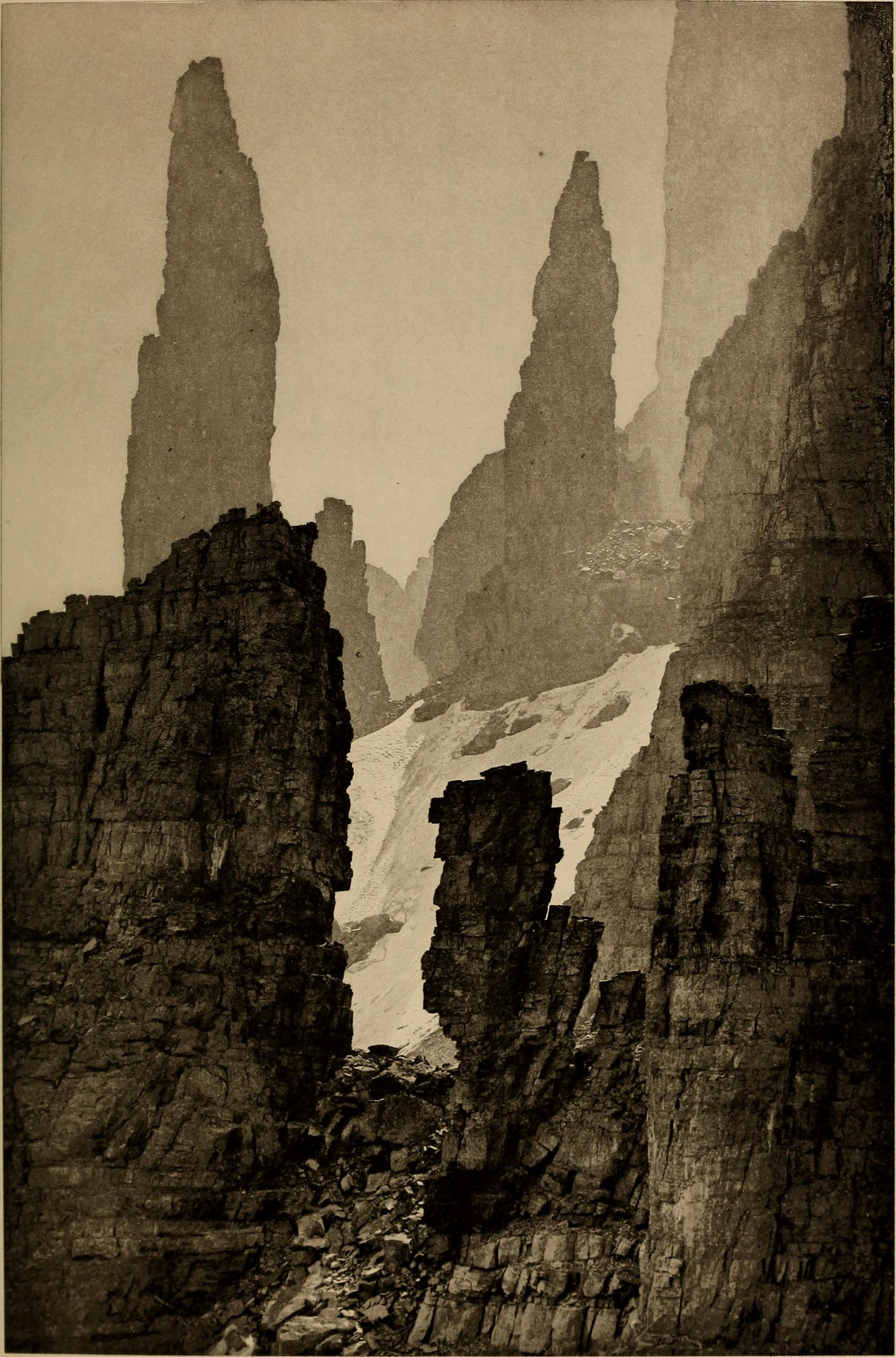
1909 image by Walter Wilcox

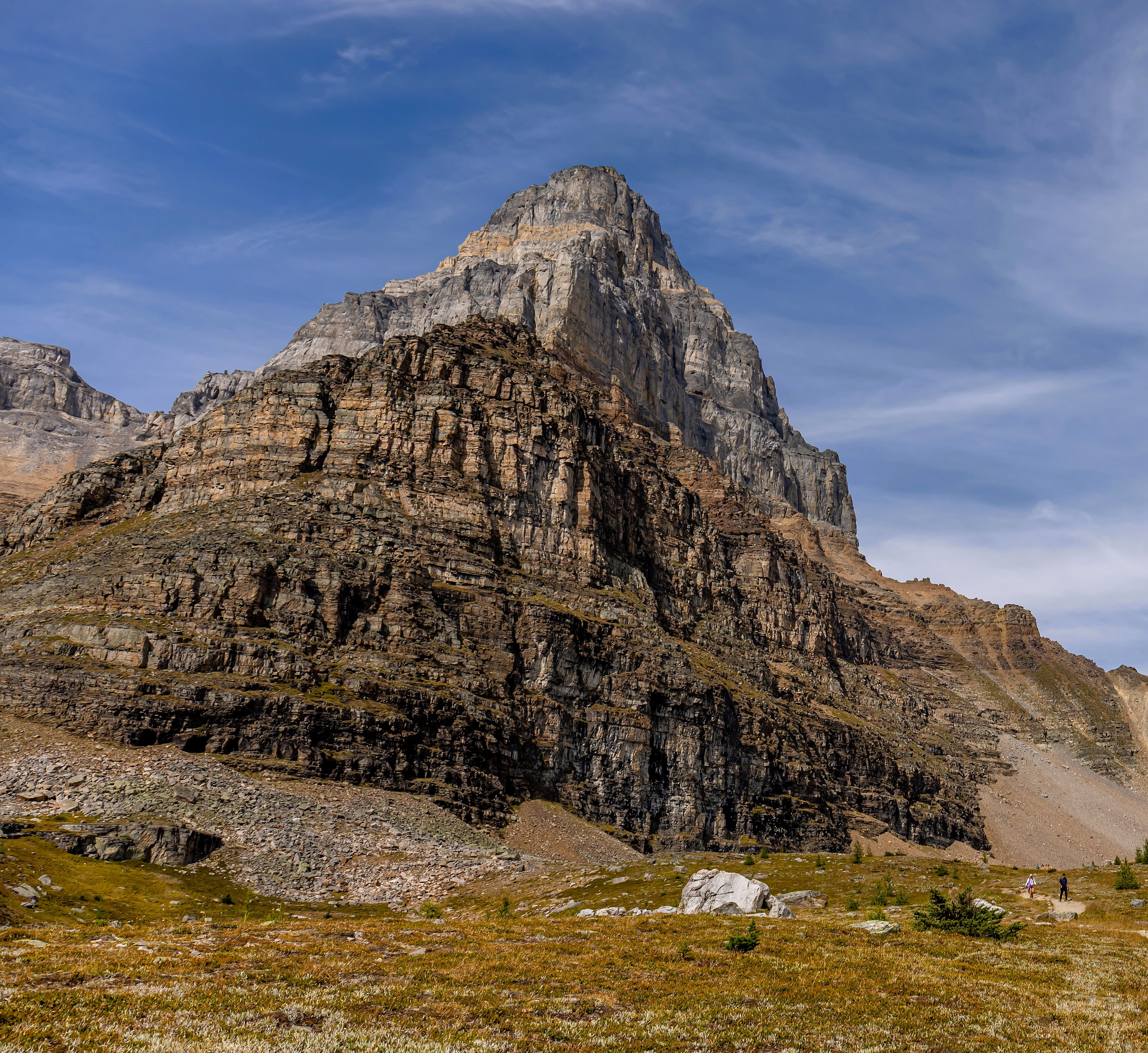
Southeast aspect

== See also ==
- Geography of Alberta
- Geology of Alberta
- Geology of the Rocky Mountains
