= Popes Peak =

Mountain on Alberta/British Columbia border in Canada

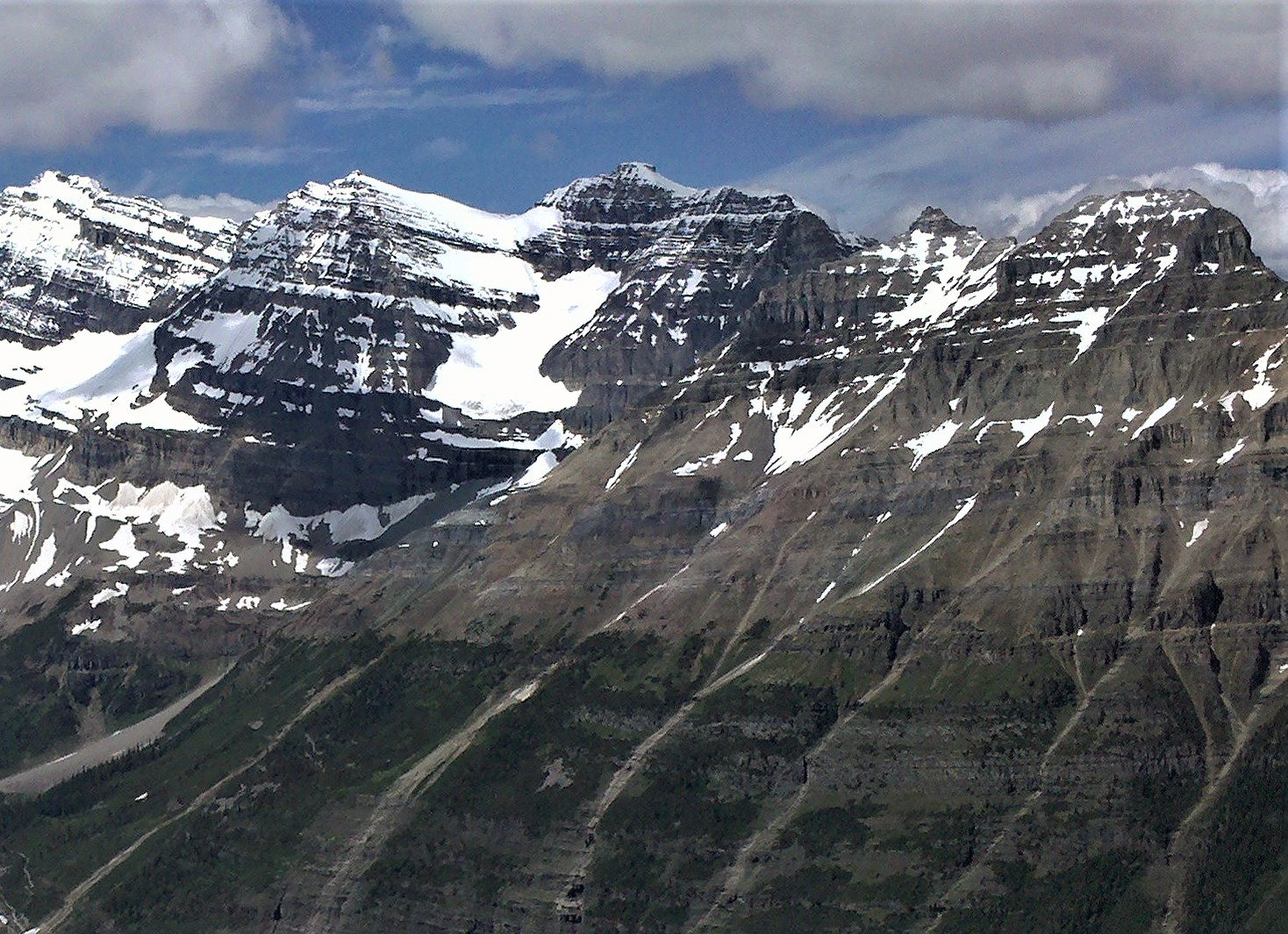
- Popes Peak centered at top

Highest point
- Elevation: 3,163 m (10,377 ft)
- Prominence: 81 m (266 ft)
- Parent peak: Collier Peak (3232 m)
- Listing: Mountains of Alberta; Mountains of British Columbia
- Coordinates: 51°24′08″N 116°17′40″W

Geography
- Location within Alberta Location within British Columbia Location within Canada
- Interactive map of Popes Peak
- Country: Canada
- Provinces: Alberta and British Columbia
- Protected areas: Banff National Park; Yoho National Park
- Parent range: Bow Range
- Topo map: NTS 82N8 Lake Louise

Climbing
- First ascent: 1903 George Collier, Joseph Collier, Christian Kaufmann
- Easiest route: North Face III

Popes Peak is a mountain on the border of Alberta and British Columbia in Western Canada, on the Continental Divide of the Americas, part of the Bow Range of the Canadian Rockies between Lake Louise Valley and Cataract Brook, bordering Banff and Yoho national parks.

The peak was named in 1887 after John Henry Pope, a member of the 1st Canadian Parliament. It was initially known as Boundary Peak for the borders running through it, just south of Kicking Horse Pass

The mountain was first climbed in 1903 by George Collier and his brother Joseph, guided by Christian Kaufmann.

== Geology ==
Popes Peak is composed of sedimentary rock laid down during the Precambrian to Jurassic periods. Formed in shallow seas, this sedimentary rock was pushed east and over the top of younger rock during the Laramide orogeny.

== Climate ==
According to the Köppen climate classification, Popes Peak is in a subarctic climate zone with cold, snowy winters and mild summers. Winter temperatures can drop below −20 °C, and wind chill factors below −30 °C.

== Gallery ==
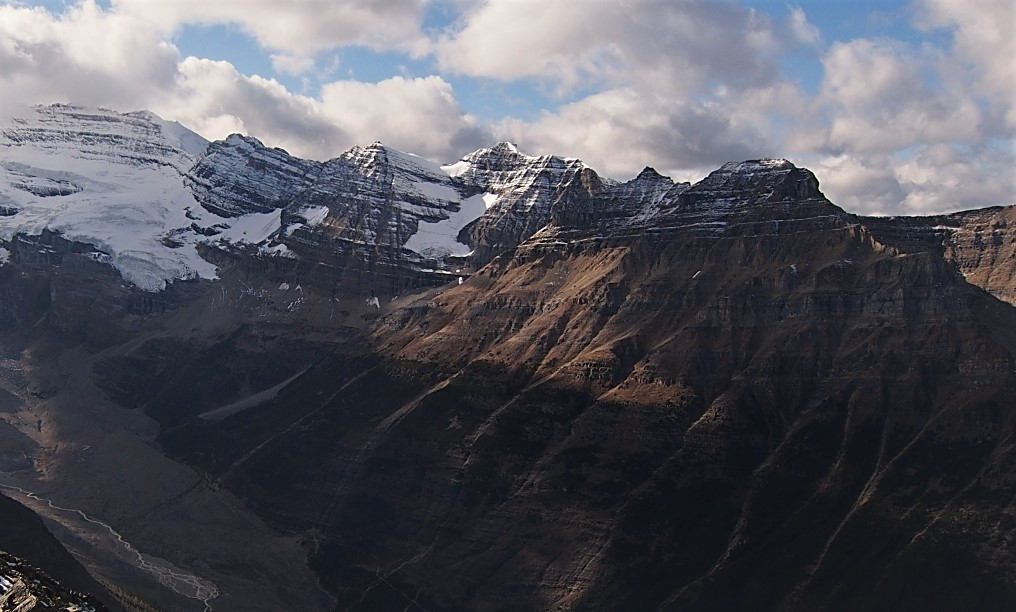
Popes Peak from Fairview Mountain

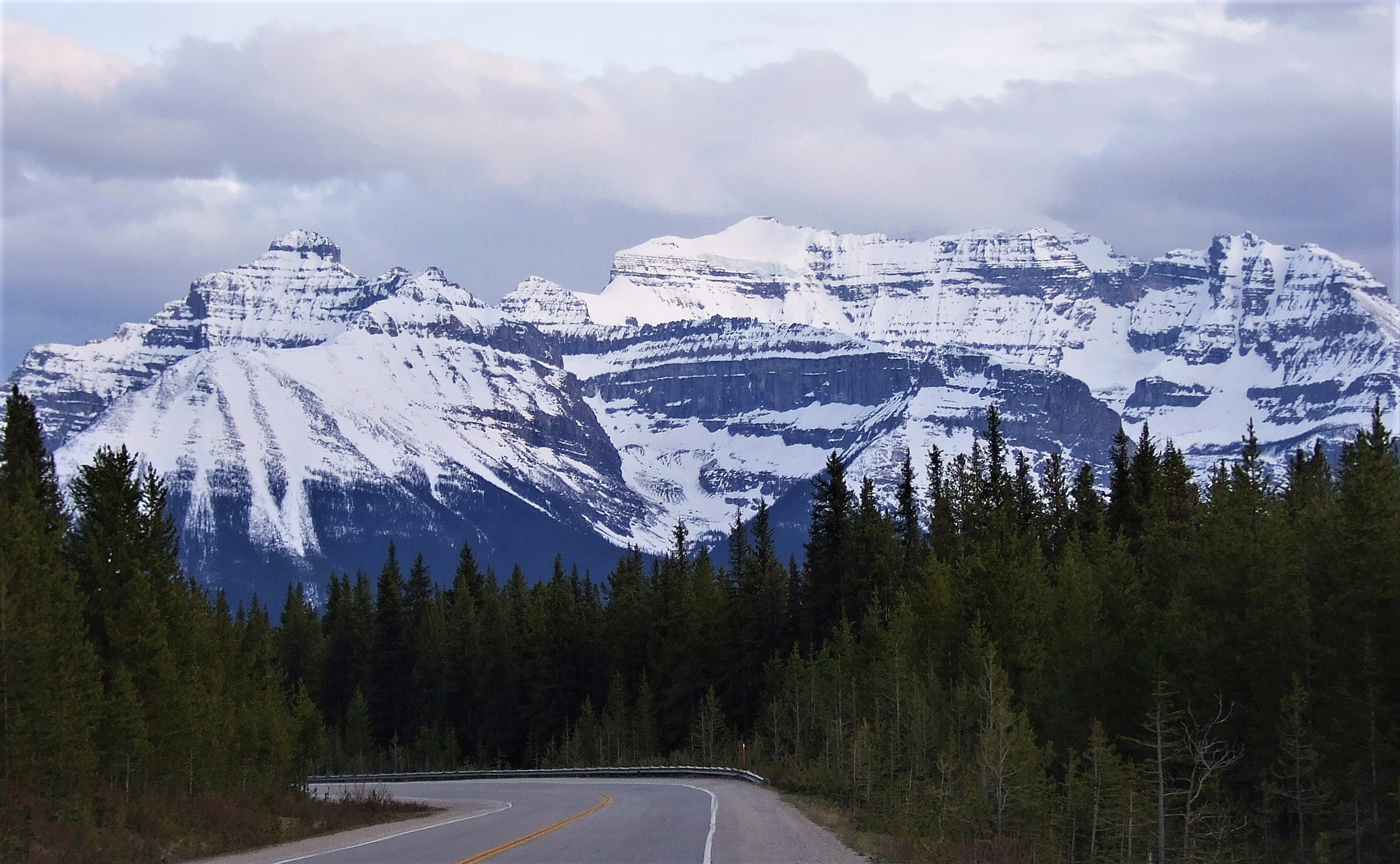
North aspect of Popes Peak (center) with Mt. Niblock (left)

== See also ==
- List of peaks on the Alberta–British Columbia border
- List of mountains in the Canadian Rockies
