= Eiffel Peak =

Mountain in Alberta, Canada

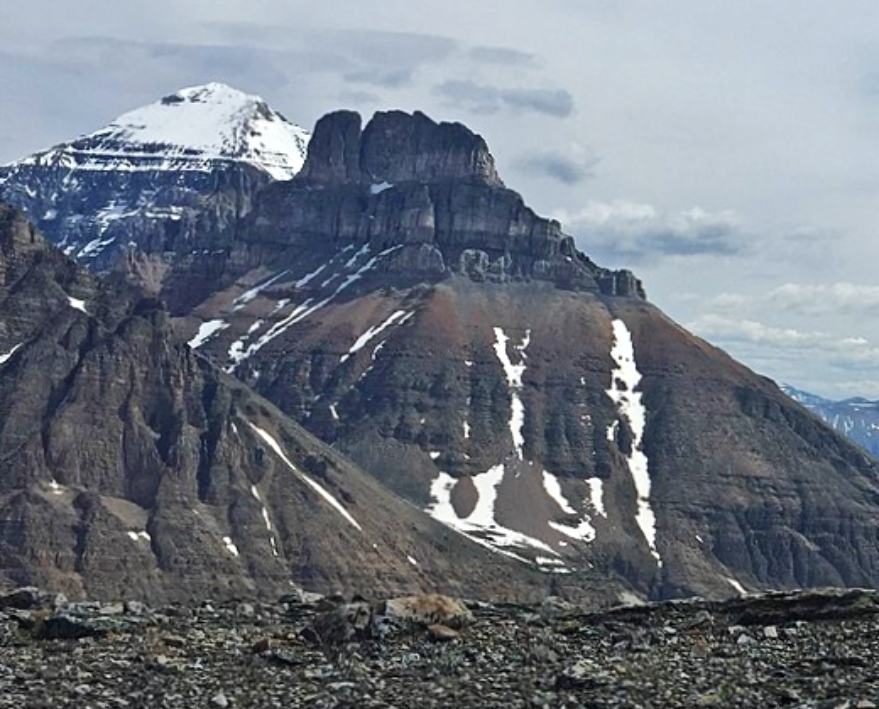
- Eiffel Peak (center) with snow-capped Mount Temple (left) seen from Wenkchemna Pass

Highest point
- Elevation: 3,077 m (10,095 ft)
- Prominence: 465 m (1,526 ft)
- Listing: Mountains of Alberta
- Coordinates: 51°19′56″N 116°14′07″W

Geography
- Location within Alberta Location within Canada
- Interactive map of Eiffel Peak
- Location: Alberta
- Parent range: Bow Range; Canadian Rockies
- Topo map: NTS 82N8 Lake Louise

Geology
- Rock type: Sedimentary rock

Climbing
- First ascent: 1901 Charles S. Thompson, G.M. Weed, H. Kaufmann
- Easiest route: Scramble

Eiffel Peak is a 3,077-metre (10,095-foot) mountain summit in Banff National Park in Alberta, Canada. It's part of the Bow Range, which is a sub-range of the Canadian Rockies. The nearest higher peak is Mount Temple, 3.0 km (1.9 mi) to the northeast.

== History ==
The first ascent was made in 1901 by Charles S. Thompson and G.M. Weed, with Hans Kaufmann as guide.

The peak was named in 1908 by Arthur O. Wheeler on account of its great height; its name is an allusion to the Eiffel Tower.

The mountain's name was made official in 1952 by the Geographical Names Board of Canada.

== Geology ==
Eiffel Peak is composed of sedimentary rock laid down during the Precambrian to Jurassic periods. Formed in shallow seas, this sedimentary rock was pushed east and over the top of younger rock during the Laramide orogeny.

== Climate ==
Based on the Köppen climate classification, Eiffel Peak is located in a subarctic climate with cold, snowy winters, and mild summers. Temperatures can drop below −20 C with wind chill factors below −30 C.

== Gallery ==
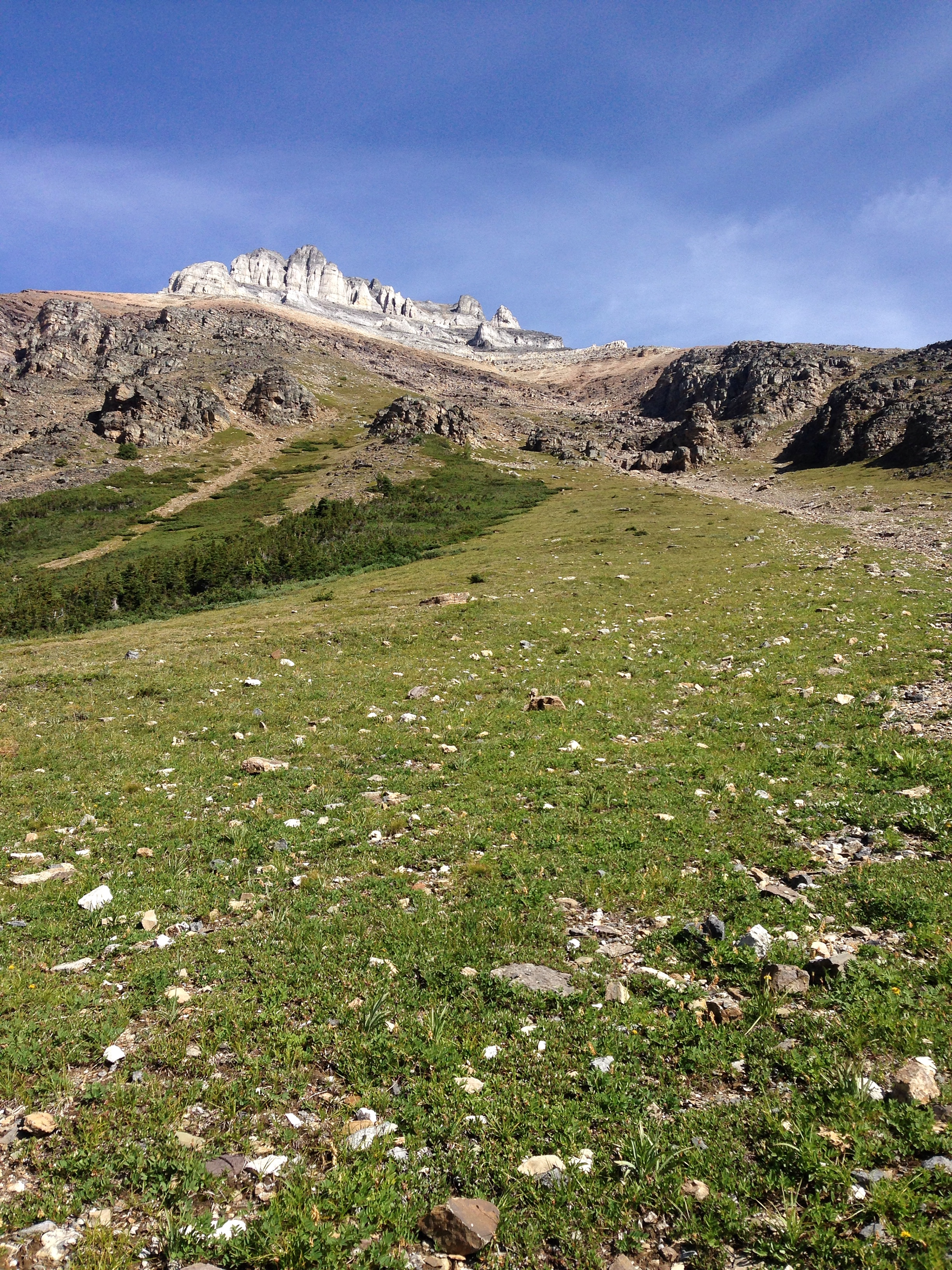
Eiffel Peak

== See also ==
- Mountains of Alberta
- Geography of Alberta
