= Mount Huber =

Mountain in British Columbia, Canada

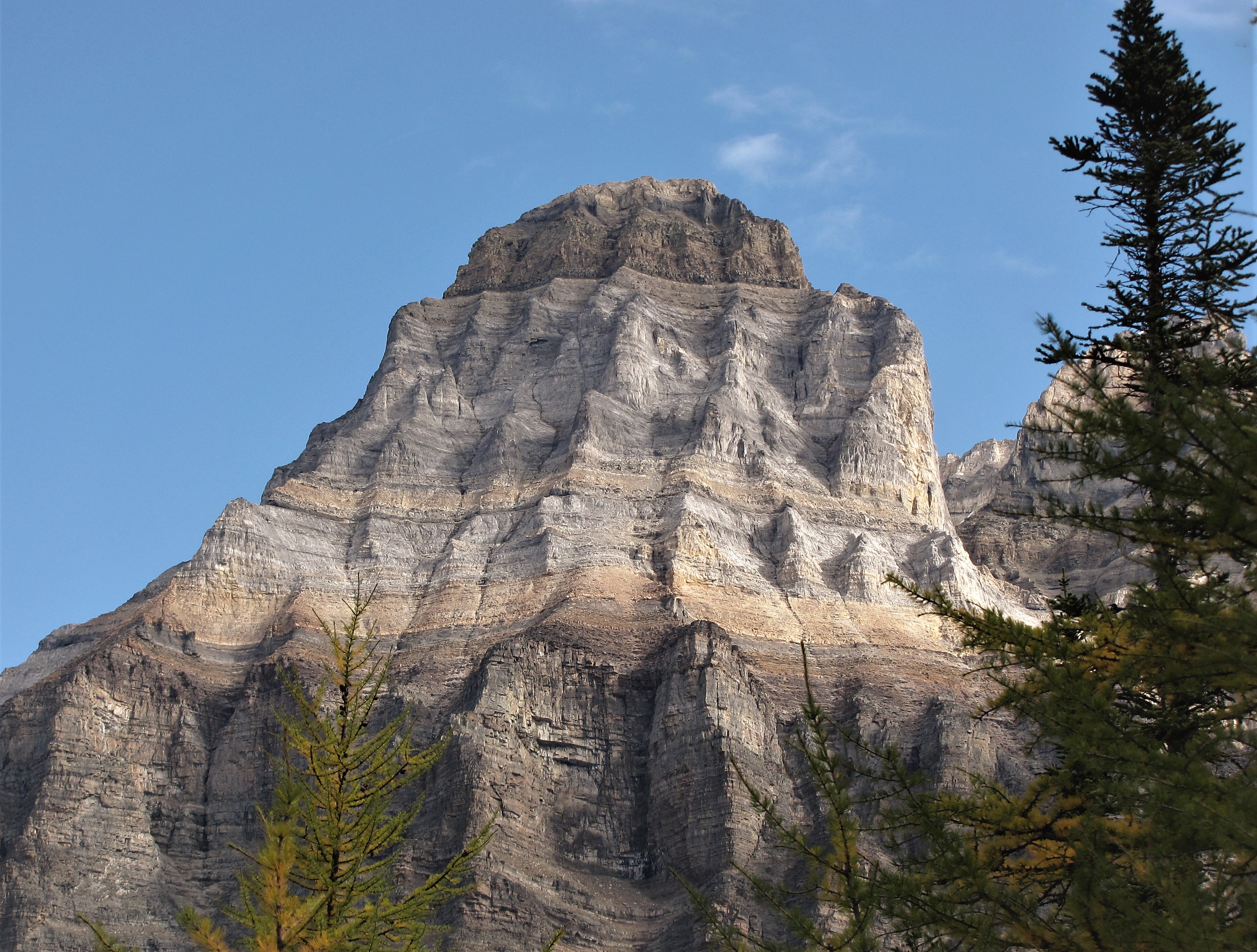
- Mount Huber, southwest aspect

Highest point
- Elevation: 3,348 m (10,984 ft) (Note: SRTM gives an elevation of 3354 metres.)
- Prominence: 158 m (518 ft)
- Parent peak: Mount Victoria (3464 m)
- Listing: Mountains of British Columbia
- Coordinates: 51°22′13″N 116°18′44″W

Geography
- Location within British Columbia Location within Canada
- Interactive map of Mount Huber
- Country: Canada
- Province: British Columbia
- District: Kootenay Land District
- Protected area: Yoho National Park
- Parent range: Bow Range → Canadian Rockies
- Topo map: NTS 82N8 Lake Louise

Geology
- Rock age: Cambrian
- Rock type: Limestone

Climbing
- First ascent: 1903 George Collier, E. Tewes, Christian Bohren, Christian Kaufmann
- Easiest route: Scrambling class 4

Mount Huber is a 3,348-metre (10,984-foot) summit located two kilometres east of Lake O'Hara in the Bow Range of Yoho National Park, in the Canadian Rockies of British Columbia, Canada. The nearest higher neighbor is Mount Victoria, 1.0 km (0.62 mi) to the north-northeast on the Continental Divide. Mount Huber is a secondary summit of Mount Victoria.

== History ==
Named in 1903 by Samuel Allen for Emil Huber, a Swiss climber, who, with Carl Sulzer, were first to climb Mount Sir Donald in the Selkirk Mountains. The first ascent of Mount Huber was made in 1903 by George Collier, E. Tewes, Christian Bohren, and Christian Kaufmann. The mountain's toponym was officially adopted in 1924 by the Geographical Names Board of Canada.

== Geology ==
Mount Huber is composed of sedimentary rock laid down during the Precambrian to Jurassic periods. Formed in shallow seas, this sedimentary rock was pushed east and over the top of younger rock during the Laramide orogeny.

== Climate ==
Based on the Köppen climate classification, Mount Huber is located in a subarctic climate zone with cold, snowy winters, and mild summers. Temperatures can drop below −20 °C (−4 °F) with wind chill factors below −30 °C (−22 °F). Precipitation runoff from Mount Huber drains into tributaries of the Kicking Horse River which is a tributary of the Columbia River.

== Gallery ==
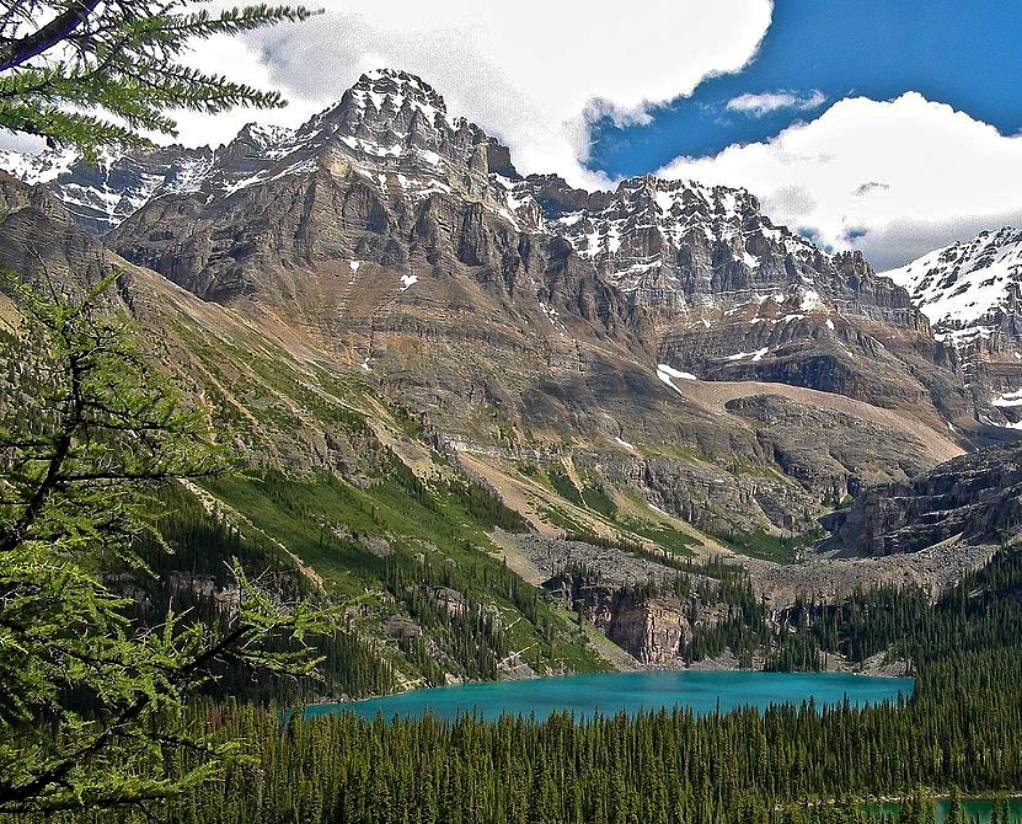
Mount Huber seen above Lake O'Hara

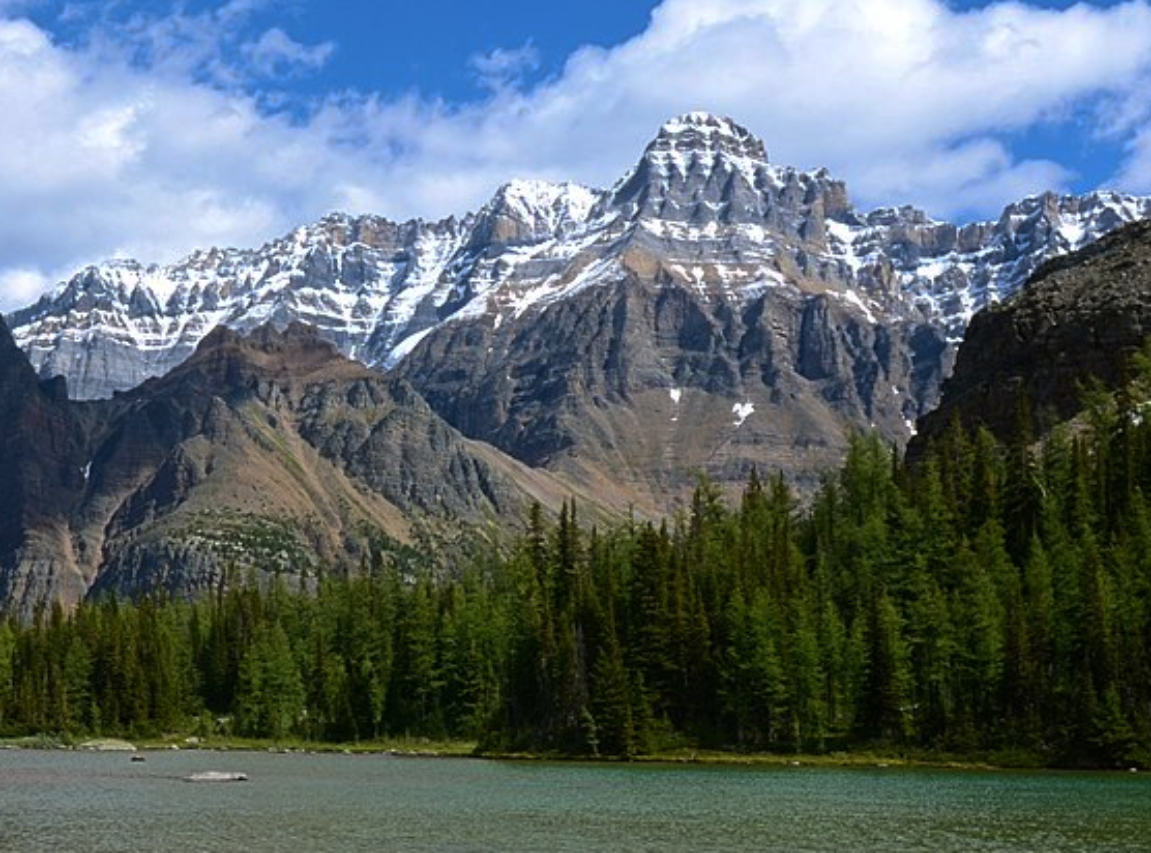
Mount Huber seen from Shaffer Lake

== See also ==
- List of mountains in the Canadian Rockies
