= Ringrose Peak =

Mountain in AB/BC, Canada

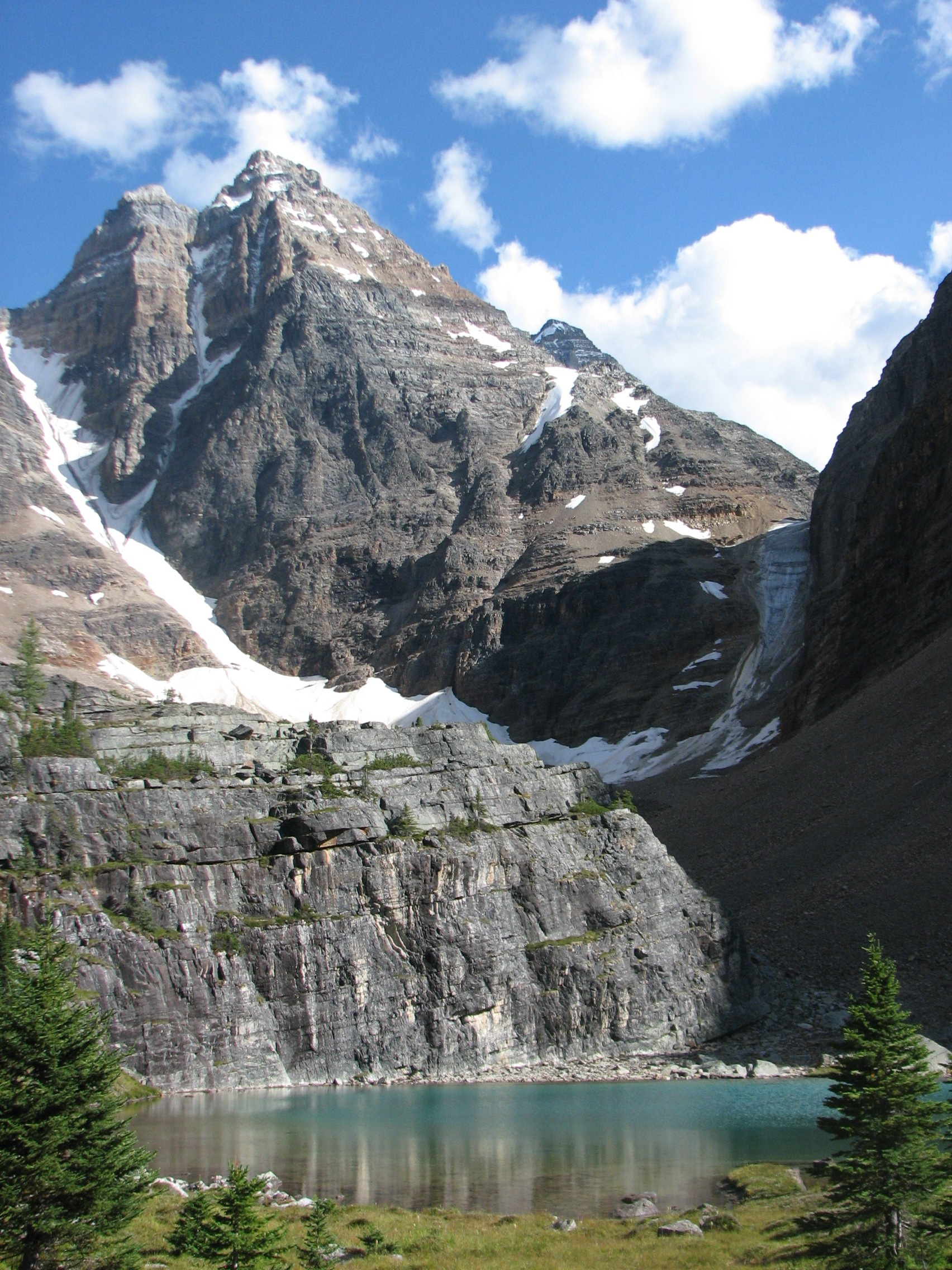
- Ringrose Peak soars above a pond (Lake Oesa) near Lake O'Hara

Highest point
- Elevation: 3,292 m (10,801 ft)
- Prominence: 137 m (449 ft)
- Listing: Mountains of Alberta; Mountains of British Columbia
- Coordinates: 51°20′34″N 116°17′28″W

Geography
- Country: Canada
- Provinces: British Columbia and Alberta
- Protected areas: Banff National Park; Yoho National Park
- Parent range: Bow Range
- Topo map: NTS 82N8 Lake Louise

Climbing
- First ascent: 1909 by V.A. Fynn and E.F. Pilkington

Ringrose Peak is a mountain on the Alberta—British Columbia border, in Canada.

It is located on the Continental Divide on the border of Banff and Yoho National Parks and is part of the Bow Range of the Banff-Lake Louise Core Area in the Canadian Rockies.

The peak was named in 1894 after Arthur Edmund Leake Ringrose by Samuel Allen, because previously Allen had met Ringrose while Allen was visiting the Rockies. Ringrose was visiting from London, England.

== See also ==
- List of peaks on the Alberta–British Columbia border
