= Tram types in Adelaide =

Types of tram that operated in Adelaide, South Australia

This article describes the tram types in Adelaide that have operated for the past 148 years: from early days when they undertook a major share of the public transport task before car ownership was well established; through the 49-year period when only one tram line operated; to the city's 21st-century tramways revival.

== The three eras of Adelaide trams since 1878 ==
The evolution of public and private transport in Adelaide has closely reflected the economic and social development of South Australia. Growth of the Adelaide conurbation also reflected the development of efficient public transport. Horse-drawn transport characterised the foundation years, but with industrial development and the growth of the suburbs the extension of tramway (and railway) networks was a feature of urban transport and development until the Second World War.

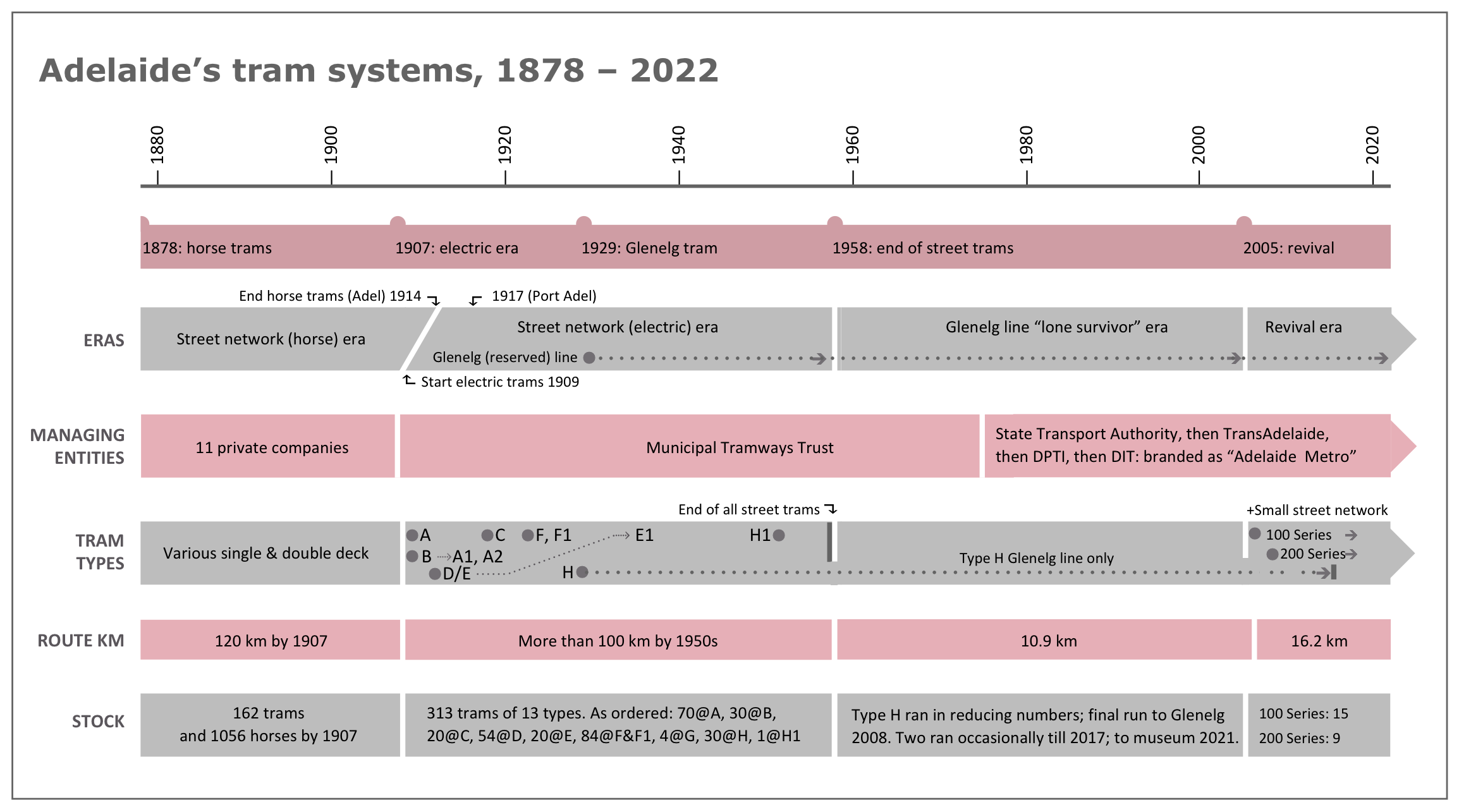
A timeline chart showing Adelaide's tram types, total numbers, route kilometres, and owners

There have been three generations of trams over the 148 years since street vehicles first ran on steel (or iron) rails in Adelaide:

- 1878–1917, horse trams built in the United States and locally: more than 150 lightweight horse-drawn trams travelled along about 120 km (75 mi) of lines in the streets of the city's centre and its suburbs.
- 1909–1952, electric trams built locally, at first from American kits: more than 300 electric trams ran on more than 100 km (62 mi) of routes similar to those of the horse trams until all street tram services ceased in 1958. From then until 2006 only the 1929-vintage "Glenelg" trams survived, running mostly off-street on the 10.9 km (6.8 mi) line from Adelaide's centre to the beach.
- Since 2006, contemporary trams built overseas: Twenty-four state-of-the-art trams of two makes replaced the by-then vintage trams on the Glenelg line and subsequently on 5.4 km (3.4 mi) of newly built line extensions north through the city centre and on to the city's cultural and entertainment precincts.

== Horse trams ==
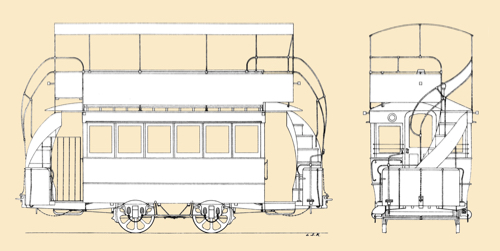

At a glance
Adelaide was an early adopter, in 1878, of horse trams but the last of Australia's capital cities to subsequently move to more efficient technologies. Eleven private companies eventually competed on their own lines that totalled 119 kilometres (74 miles) by 1901. More than 150 trams were built in the United States or, later, to almost identical designs by local coachbuilders or horse tram companies.

Since the horse tram companies lacked the capital to upgrade their technology after drought and a long economic depression, the South Australian Government bought the assets of most of them in 1907. It established the Municipal Tramways Trust to rapidly construct an electrified network. Horse trams operated during the new lines' construction until the last was withdrawn from Adelaide-centric lines in 1914 (and in 1917 in Port Adelaide).

First electric trams acquired after the horse tram era: Type A and Type B in 1908.

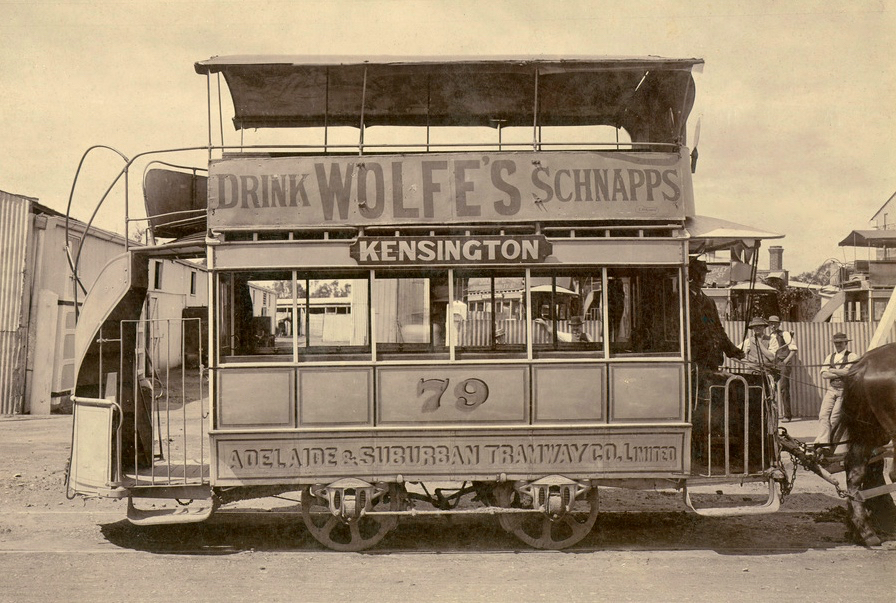
A horse tram owned by the Adelaide and Suburban Tramway Company, circa 1909

During the 39-year horse-drawn era that started on 10 June 1878, trams were mainly double-decked with an enclosed saloon 12 to 16 feet (3.7 to 4.9 metres) long and an open seated area of the same length above it; and single-decked cars 10 to 12 feet (3.0 to 3.7 metres) long. Although they were owned by 11 companies, their designs were similar: extremely lightweight in construction and with minimal springing. However, even at an average speed of 8 kilometres per hour (5 miles per hour) they were a vast improvement on the speed and comfort of horse-drawn street carriages. Their light weight was reflected in horse trams that ran to Henley Beach not being fitted with an upper-deck canvas awning for fear that a sea breeze would blow the tram over, and by the practice followed when horse trams met while travelling in opposite directions on single track: the one with the fewer passengers, derailed by able-bodied males, was pulled out of the way to allow the other car to pass.

An Adelaide company, Duncan & Fraser Ltd of Franklin Street, assembled the city's first 20 horse-drawn trams manufactured (and dismantled for shipping) by the John Stephenson Company, New York City. The company that ordered them, the Adelaide & Suburban Tramway Company, manufactured horse trams in its own factory at Kensington from 1897.

By 1907 there were 162 trams, drawn by 1056 horses, servicing routes totalling about 120 kilometres (75 miles) in length. Except in minor respects the trams' designs did not evolve during the 36 years in which they operated.

The South Australian government purchased the assets of almost all of the companies in 1907 and in December incorporated the Municipal Tramways Trust (MTT) to introduce an electrified system. While the electric lines were being built, the trust operated many of the acquired horse trams but in decreasing numbers, withdrawing horse tram services altogether in July 1914 in the City of Adelaide and, after delays caused by the war, in 1917 on the isolated Port Adelaide system.

== A battery tram trialled in 1889 ==
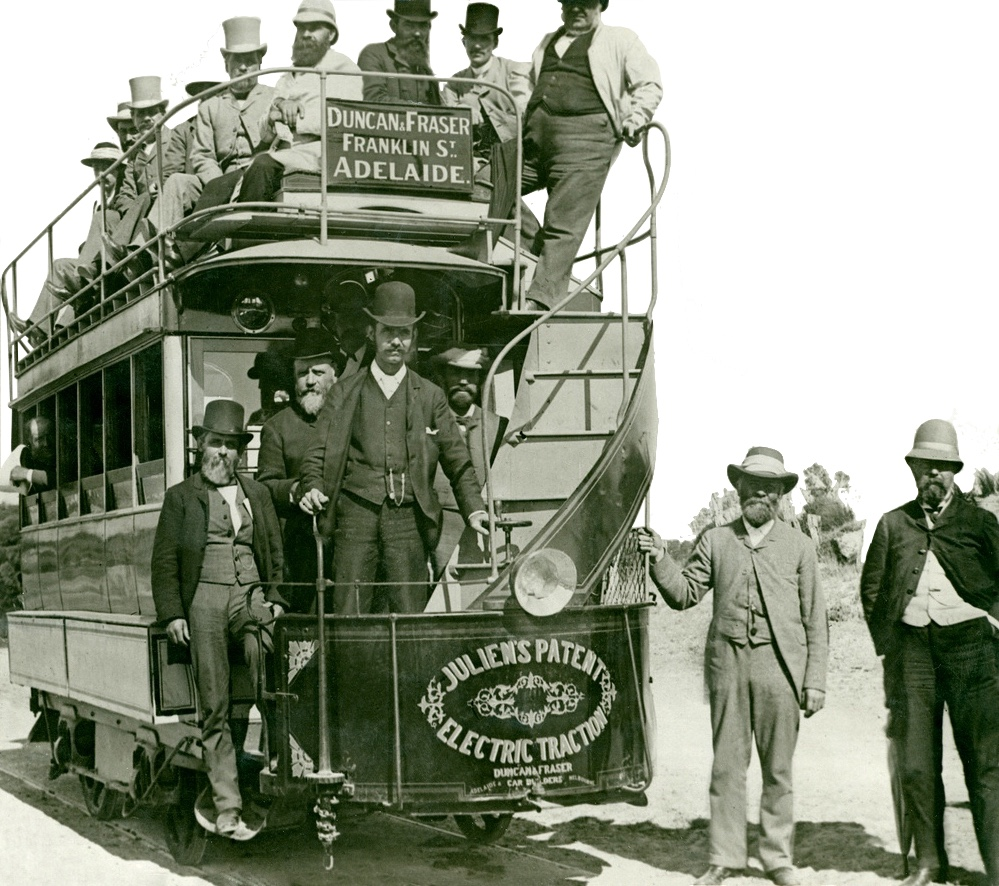
A trip to Henley Beach on 9 January 1889 to trial a tram powered by Julien's Patent electric traction (battery) technology

Adelaide's horse tram era was briefly punctuated by a technology that foreshadowed the direction in which public transport would be transformed around the world. In 1889 – eight years after the world's first commercially successful electric tram ran in Germany, and in the same year that Melbourne introduced overhead-powered electric trams – the Adelaide and Hindmarsh Tramway Company Limited conducted trials of a tram powered by Julien's Patent electric traction technology. It was a battery-powered tramcar, which was promoted as offering the advantages of electrical power without the cost of erecting overhead wires.

On 9 January 1889 the car, adapted from a double-deck horse car built by Adelaide coachbuilders Duncan & Fraser, made the first of several fast journeys to Henley Beach. The project ended the following year when the two proponents were killed in a railway level crossing accident. Adelaide had to wait another 20 years for electrification.

== Electric trams ==
In total, 337 electric trams of 14 types have operated over Adelaide's tramways, which totalled a little more than 100 km (62 mi) until 1958, when the street tramways were closed down, and which now total 16 km (9.9 mi). During the 44 years between the inauguration of the first electric tram in 1909 and the delivery of the last tram in 1953 the Municipal Tramways Trust commissioned 313 of the first 12 electric tram types described in this article.

Details of the trams in the order of their introduction are in the following panel, expandable by clicking [show].

Adelaide electric tram types in date order of their introduction or conversion
First ran (Note: In revenue service.)	Designation	Known as (Note: Quotation marks show terms used by the public.)	Qty built	Tram nos	Last ran (Note: Applies to revenue service. See the section for details of vehicles that are in preserved and operating condition.) (Note: 100 and 200 Series are the trams now in revenue service.)	Seating and crush load (Note: The crush load figure includes the number of seated passengers shown. Crush load was defined by the MTT as: all seats filled, 9 inches (230 mm) of clearance in front of longitudinal seats and one standing passenger per 1.27 square feet (0.118 square metres) of remaining floor space.) (Note: For Adelaide's Flexity Classic trams, Bombardier used a figure of four passengers per square metre.)
1909	Type A	California combination	70	1–30, 61–100	1952	40 / 101
1909	Type B	Open crossbench ("toast rack")	30	31–60	1930s	50 / 102
1910	Type E	Bogie open combination	20	101–120	1936	54 / 152
1911	Type D	Bogie closed combination	54 (Note: Four trams almost identical to the 50 Type D trams were acquired from the builder in 1912 by a tramway trust in Melbourne; the MTT did not acquire them until 1927.)	121–170, 191–194	1954	54 / 152 (Note: After their 1934 conversion the Type D trams' capacity was 50.)
1917	Type A1 (conversions from Type B)	California combination	[17] (Note: From Type B total of 30.)	44–60	1950	40 / 101
1917	Type A2 (conversions from Type B)	"Tanks"	[3]	41–43	1935	40 / 101
1918	Type C	"Desert Gold" and "Bouncing Billies"	20	171–190	1954	40 / 102
1922	Type F	Dropcentre	50	201–250	1958	60 / 170
1925	Type F1 (almost identical variant of Type F)	Dropcentre	34	251–284	1958	60 / 170
1925	Type G	Birney safety car	4	301–304	1935	32 / 80
1929	Type H (later, 300 Series)	"Glenelg tram", "Bay tram"	30	351–380	2015 (Note: Most were progressively retired by 2006 as their replacements came on line. After that, five (previously upgraded with equipment such as vigilance controls) were retained to run a weekend "heritage tram" service. After a further refurbishment, two (351 and 352, formerly 367) were retained at Glengowrie depot for occasional use after normal H car revenue operation ceased in 2008. Their last use was in 2015. In 2017 they were placed in long-term departmental storage at Walkley Heights. In 2021, the Department for Infrastructure and Transport donated them to the Tramway Museum, St Kilda.)	64 / 170 (Note: Reduced to 64 / 94 about 1990.)
1936	Type E1 (conversions from Type E)	Bogie saloon	[20] (Note: From Type E total of 20.)	101–120	1958	49 / 152
1953	Type H1 (prototype)	"The streamliner"	1	381	1957	52 / 184
2006	100 Series	"Flexity"	15	101–115 (Note: The original no. 103, damaged during shipping from Germany, was subsequently retained for its spare parts. The replacement no. 103 was the final 100 Series tram delivered.)	N/a (15 in service as at 2018)	64 / 115
2009, 2017	200 Series	"Citadis"	9	201–209	N/a (9 in service as at 2018)	54 / 186

== Trams of the 20th century ==
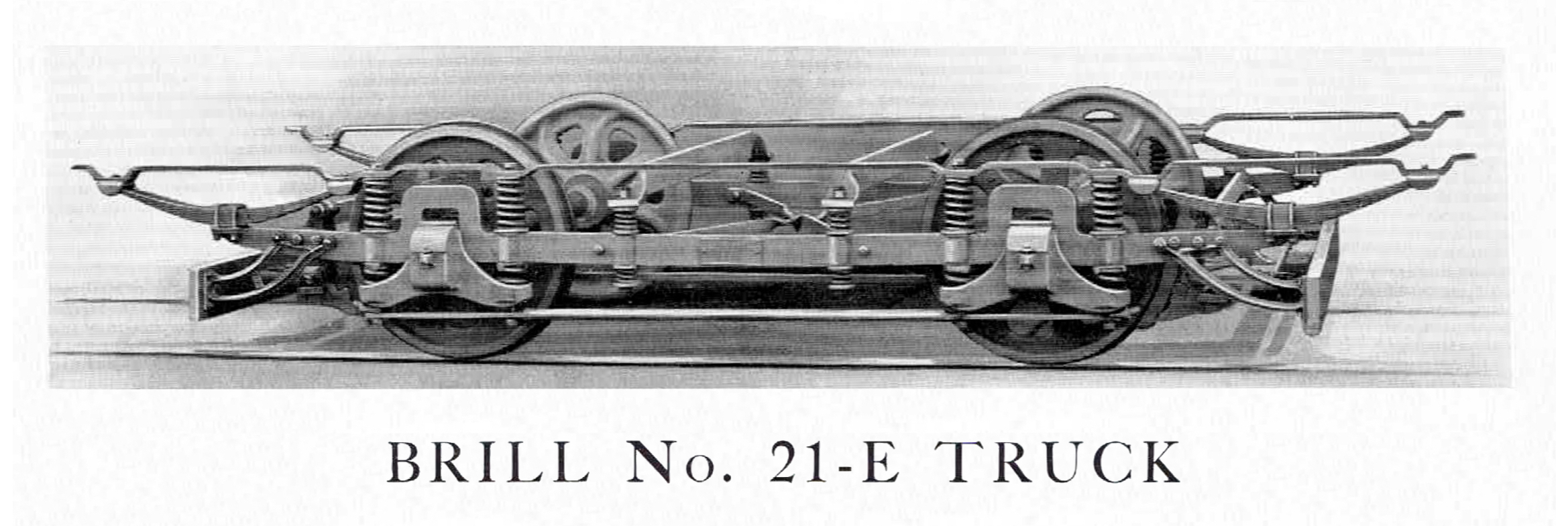
Adelaide's earliest electric trams (Types A to C) were four-wheeled and powered by this simple but robust truck, with a motor on each axle, manufactured by the J.G. Brill Company. The wooden body frame was bolted on top.

The MTT's 100 inaugural trams were of two North American designs, manufactured by the J.G. Brill Company of Philadelphia and shipped for final assembly by Adelaide coachbuilders Duncan & Fraser, who subsequently built 20 more cars. Between 1910 and 1912 another Adelaide coachbuilder, A. Pengelley & Co. of Edwardstown, assembled 50 more Brill trams, bringing a total of tram constructions before the First World War to 170.

In 1913 the MTT had developed its first design to meet the specific requirements of its own system. Eighty-four of these fast-loading "dropcentre" trams were to become the mainstay of the street network until it was closed in 1958. However, the constraints of the First World War delayed their construction until 1921. As a stopgap to meet demand from extended routes, 20 four-wheeled trams were built cheaply in 1918, to almost the same design as the first of the inaugural tram types. Four Brill lightweight trams were imported in 1925 to handle the lightly trafficked, isolated Port Adelaide system.

In 1929, twenty years after a false start, the Glenelg railway line was converted to electric operation. Since most of the line was in a private reservation, the MTT designed an interurban-style high-speed (for the time) end-loading saloon tram with power-operated doors and folding steps. Thirty of them, capable of running coupled together, were built hurriedly for the line's opening. Popularly known as "Glenelg" or "Bay" trams, they were to operate in revenue service for 77 years. An updated version of the Glenelg trams was designed in 1939, but post-war material shortages delayed the introduction of the first – and ultimately the only – car until 1953.

While the last tram was being built, a parliamentary select committee concluded a report into the MTT in June 1952. The South Australian government then replaced the local government councillors comprising most of the MTT board with its government officials and announced its intention to close all of Adelaide's tram services, to be replaced by buses. The last street tram operated on 22 November 1958, leaving only the Glenelg line and its unique trams to survive, on a route from Victoria Square, the geographic centre of Adelaide, to Moseley Square, Glenelg.

By 2006 the Glenelg trams had been in full-time operation for 77 years. In January a new generation of tram was introduced to run not only on a newly upgraded Glenelg line but also on 4.2 km (2.6 mi) of new street lines that were to be extended north of Victoria Square through busy central Adelaide thoroughfares. These new trams were designated the 100 Series. By year's end the 1929-vintage trams had been largely phased out of normal revenue service (the last being in 2008), only running occasionally on special occasions. In 2009 the second series of new trams went into service as the 200 Series; more arrived in 2017, bringing the total number of trams on the system to 24.

A confusing classification system

During the MTT's first 15 years, trams were identified only by their numbers. In 1923, the differing designs were allocated as "Type A" to "Type F". Subsequent acquisitions were allocated to new letters. (Note: The MTT placed "Type" first in the appellation (e.g "Type H") rather than after, a reversal of the practice in other states.) For ease of reference, trams are described in this article using the 1923 alphabetical classifications, regardless of whether they were introduced or converted before or after that year.

The alphabetical order of types did not fully correspond to the order of trams' introduction: Type C was the classification given to trams introduced seven years after Type D. Further, when 20 open-sided "toast rack" Type B cars were enclosed, they were reclassified as Types A1 and A2 rather than B1 and B2. (Note: Type A1 and A2 trams are listed under the headings Type B conversions to Type A1 and ... Type A2.) As the less confusing option, MTT trams are listed in this article in alphabetical order of their type.

A chronological listing is in the table above, and the last line in each "At a glance" panel shows the next tram type introduced.

The classification system was changed to a numeric one when the first of Adelaide's new generation of trams was delivered in 2006. These 100 Series (Bombardier Flexity Classic) trams were designated as the "100 Series" and the Type H was changed to "300 Series". Three years later, when the second new class (Alstom Citadis 302) was delivered, it was designated as the "200 Series". The new trams are listed after the alphabetical series list.

=== Type A ===
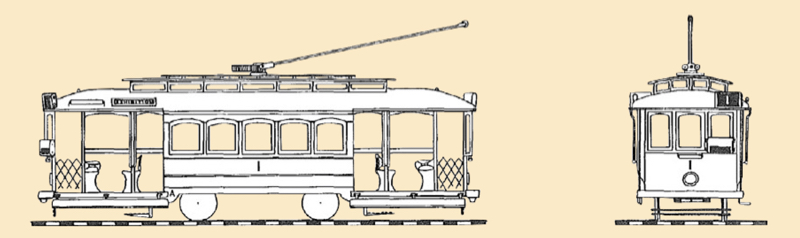

At a glance
When the Municipal Tramways Trust was set up in December 1906 to build an electric tramway system in place of Adelaide's horse trams, work proceeded hurriedly on all fronts. It was necessary to obtain 100 tramcars as quickly as possible.
Seventy trams in the first order, delivered in 1908 and 1909, were four-wheelers known as "California combination" cars. Their wooden bodies were built to a popular American design by a US manufacturer, dismantled before being shipped, and assembled by Adelaide coachbuilders. Steel undergear and electrical equipment were sourced separately from the UK and US. The trams could carry a crush load of 101 passengers, including 40 on seats – many more than horse trams.
These trams became the work-horses of the network until they were withdrawn and stored in the 1930s. During the Second World War and for five years afterwards they were returned to service, most in coupled pairs, because continuing petrol rationing obliged most people to use public transport. The last ran in 1952.

For more than a decade, all the Adelaide trams were known only by their numbers. In 1923 an alphabetical classification system was introduced; these trams were designated as Type A.

Introduced concurrently with Type B. Next types acquired: Type E in 1910 and Type D in 1911.

Type A details
Introduced	1909
No. built	70
Builder	J.G. Brill Company; assembled in Adelaide by Duncan & Fraser
Crush load	101, of whom 40 were seated
Weight	11.07 tonnes (10.90 long tons, 12.21 short tons)
Height	3.290 m (10.79 ft) 9 1/2 ins
Length	10.185 metres (33 feet 5.0 inches)s)
Width	2.692 metres (8 feet 10.0 inches)s)
Truck type	Brill 21E
No. of motors	2
Power/motor	25 kW (34 hp)

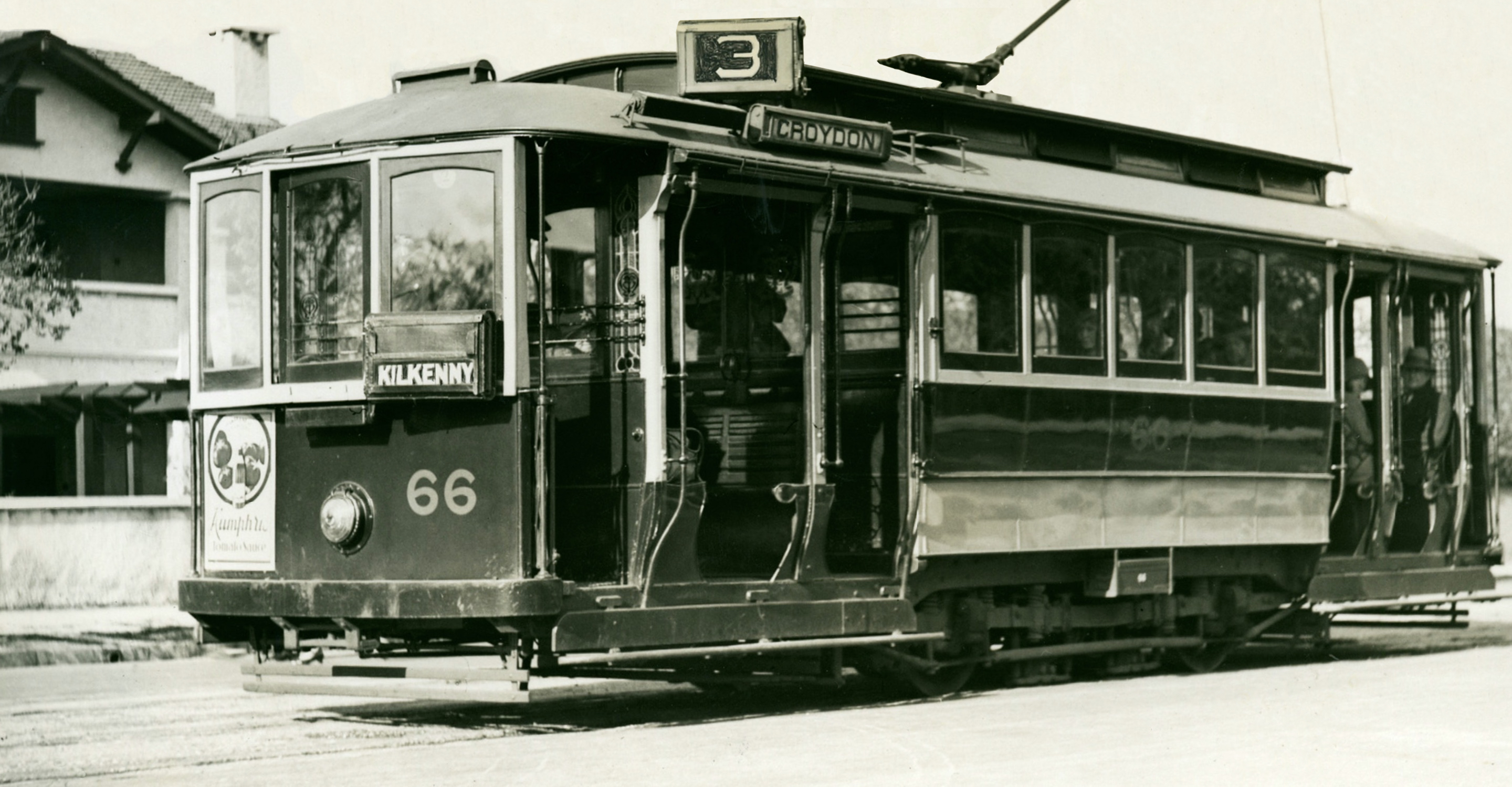
Type A tram number 66 in the early 1930s

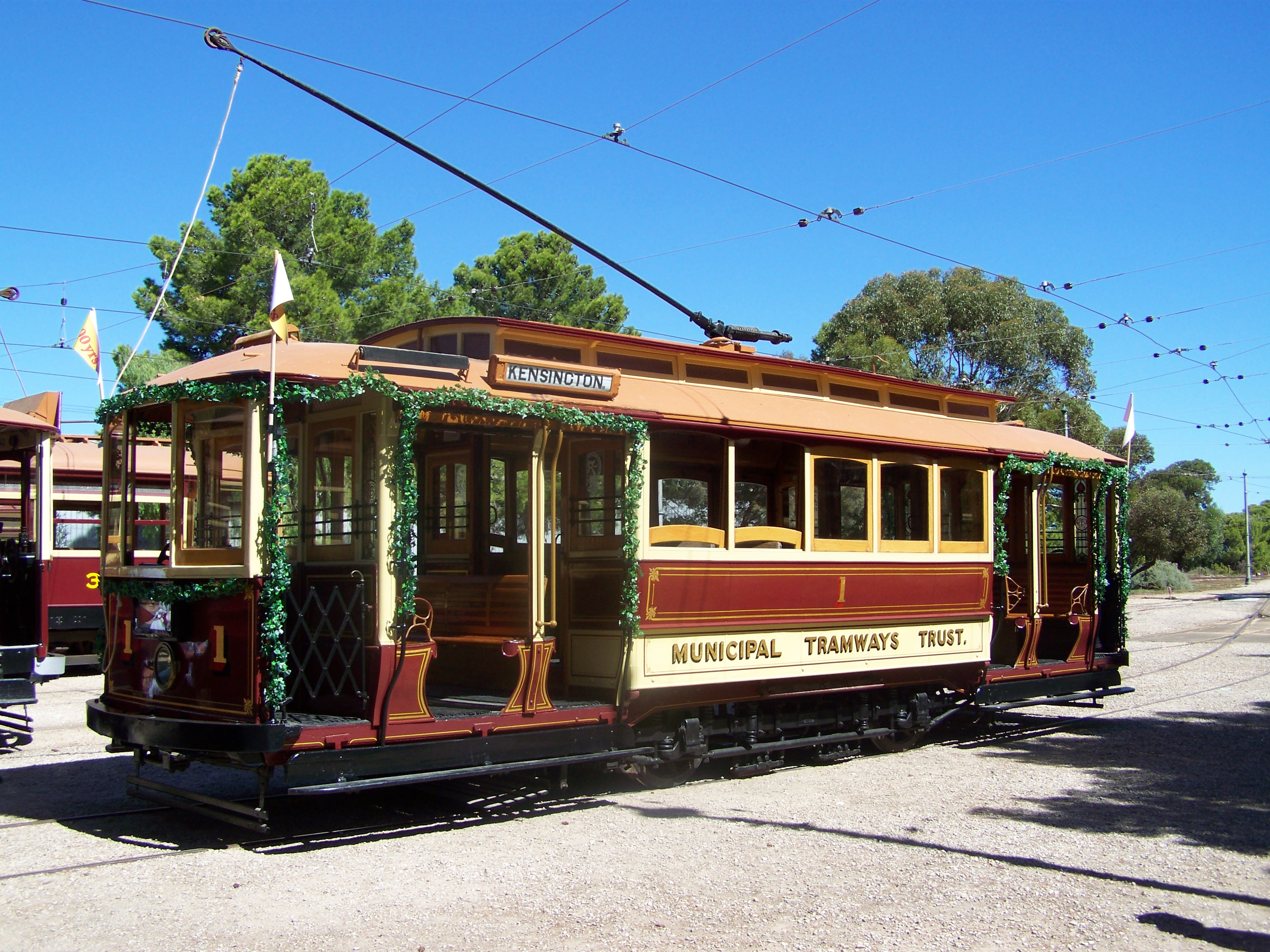
Type A tram number 1, restored to its 1909 condition, runs on special occasions at the Tramway Museum, St Kilda, South Australia

On 9 March 1909, a balmy South Australian autumn day, many thousands turned out to see a procession of 14 trams going slowly along the thoroughfares of Adelaide and nearby eastern suburbs for the official opening of the city's electric tramway system. The leading cars had a central saloon compartment somewhat similar to that of a horse tram and a compartment with cross-bench seating at each end, open to the weather. The design was popular in southern California, where the climate is similar to Adelaide's for much of the year. Thus they were officially described as "four-wheeled, drop-ended 'California combination' cars" – the "combination" referring to the two types of accommodation.

Seventy of the inaugural order of 100 trams were built to this design. In 1923, when an alphabetical classification system was introduced, they were designated as Type A.

Seating capacity was 40 passengers (20 in the saloons and 10 each end on the open benches); a further 60 could be accommodated standing, giving a total crush load of 100. Capable of speeds up to 35 kmh (22 mph), the trams presented a vast improvement in schedules and comfort over the horse trams they replaced. It was not only the trams' design that made for a smoother ride: the tracks laid by the MTT to replace the horse tram tracks were built to very high specifications – and they were brand new. However, the huge overhang from the four-wheeled truck at both ends of the car, almost double the truck's wheelbase – caused oscillations at higher speeds.

All 70 were built in 1908 and 1909 by Adelaide coachbuilders Duncan & Fraser, incorporating running gear and electrical equipment sourced from the UK and the US. Duncan & Fraser had an established record building horse tram cars for the Adelaide & Suburban Tramway Company and both horse and electric trams for several operators in Melbourne, Ballarat, Bendigo, and Geelong. The company initially constructed the cars, and Type B cars, in the machinery building of the Jubilee Exhibition grounds. (Note: Location of the Jubilee Exhibition grounds (now the University of Adelaide's Law School): 34.920°S 138.606°E) However, when the building was required by the Royal Agricultural and Horticultural Society of South Australia the work was moved to Hackney Depot, delaying construction of cars and preventing electric services from beginning on the planned date of 23 December 1908.

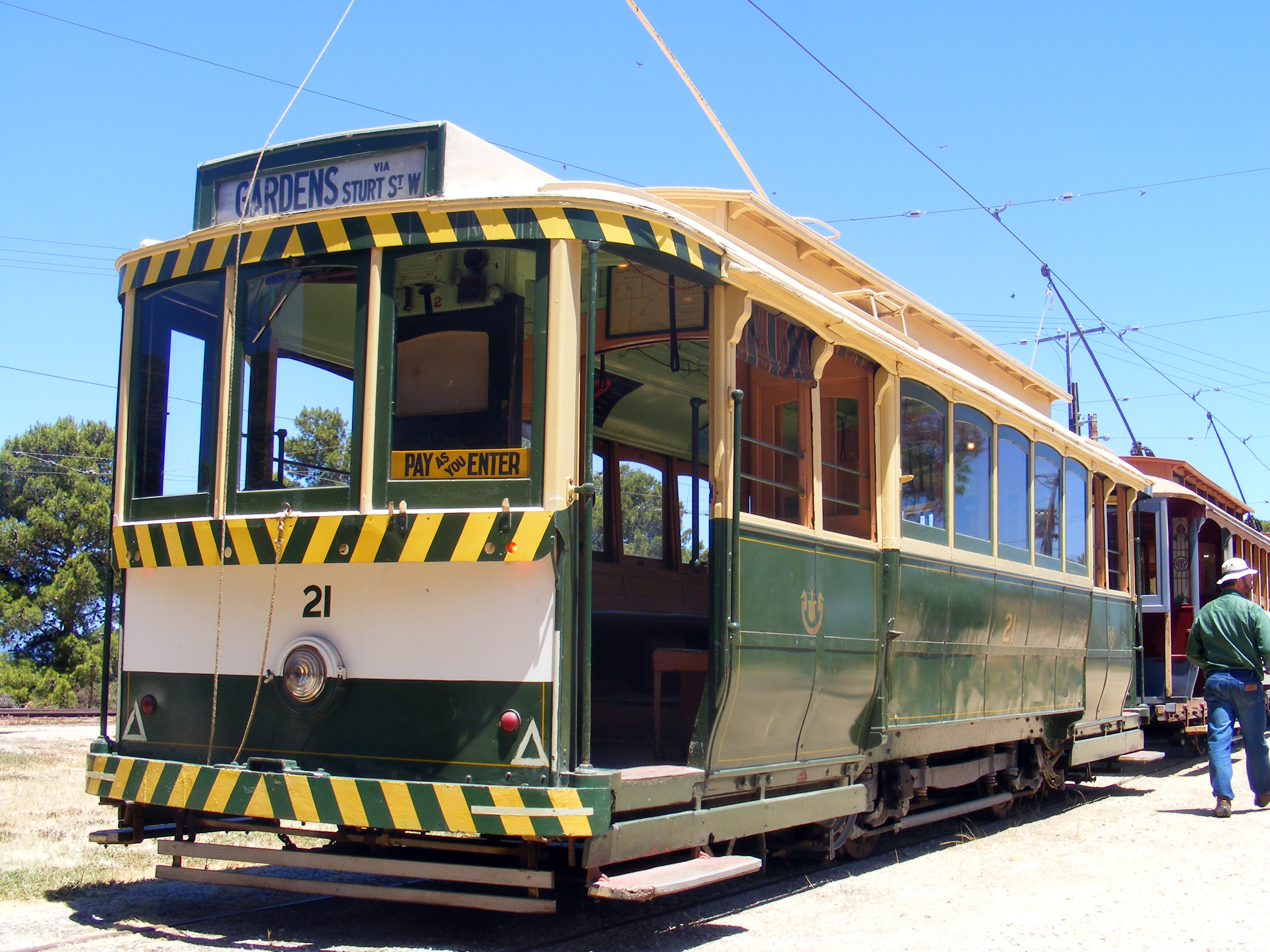
Type A tram number 10, sold to the State Electricity Commission of Victoria, now runs in its final Ballarat configuration at the Tramway Museum, St Kilda, SA.

Type A trams were the work-horses of the newly opened lines, including those to Kensington, Marryatville, Maylands, Payneham, Walkerville, North Adelaide, Parkside, Unley and Hyde Park. Later they were relegated to the quieter routes such as Croydon and Port Adelaide as larger trams became available. They were gradually retired in the 1930s, only to come out of storage in 1941 on account of wartime petrol rationing, which boosted patronage. Fifty-eight (and four Type A1 cars) were configured in permanently coupled pairs: although both trams in a pair still needed a conductor to collect fares, the need for only one driver per pair reduced staffing needs by 25 per cent – an important economy during wartime labour shortages. The paired trams soon became nick-named "Bib and Bub" after characters created by renowned children's author May Gibbs. They stayed in service after the war as the Australian Government continued petrol rationing until 1950.

Although at the time the MTT was established air brakes were being installed on streetcars in the US since they are much faster in application and release and therefore safer than mechanical brakes, Type A trams were never fitted with them; neither were any trams built before 1920. For normal stopping the Adelaide trams had a handbrake, operated by the motorman manually winding a wheel in the cab, and electromagnetic track brakes, energised by power generated by the motors as the cars slowed down, for emergencies. (Note: Starting with the Type F, built in 1921, air brakes were fitted on all new trams and from about 1922 were retrofitted to existing bogie trams – Types D and E. They were never fitted to the single-truck (four-wheeled) trams.)

Three Type A cars were sold in 1936 to the State Electricity Commission of Victoria. The remainder were withdrawn from service by May 1952; many were sold for use as shacks.

The Tram Museum, St Kilda restored Type A cars 14 and 15 in a major project lasting 15 years, which culminated when they entered service in 2021.

For Types A1 and A2 trams, see the sections headed "Type B conversion to Type A1" and "Type B conversion to Type A2".

=== Type B ===
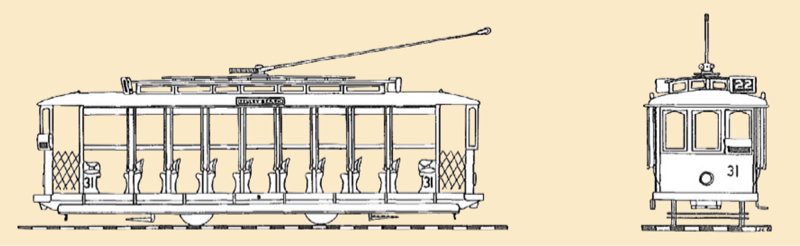

At a glance
The second component of the MTT's inaugural order of electric trams in 1908 consisted of 30 four-wheeled tramcars which later came to be designated Type B. As with their sister Type A trams, their wooden bodies were built to a popular American design by a US manufacturer, dismantled before being shipped, and assembled by Adelaide coachbuilders. Steel undergear and electrical equipment were sourced separately from the UK and US. They had completely open sides, so they soon earned the nickname, "toast racks".
They were popular when it was warm but decidedly unpopular in inclement weather. Twenty of the 30 in the class were enclosed in 1917, becoming Type A1 and Type A2. Their crush load, similar to the Type A trams, was 102, including 50 on seats.
Most were retired by the mid-1930s.

Introduced concurrently with Type A. Next types acquired: Type E in 1910 and Type D in 1911.

Type B details
Introduced	1909
No. built	30
Builder	J.G. Brill Company; assembled in Adelaide by Duncan & Fraser
Crush load	102, of whom 50 were seated
Weight	11.07 tonnes (10.90 long tons, 12.21 short tons)
Height	3.293 m (10.80 ft) 9 5/8 ins)
Length	9.906 metres (32 feet 6.0 inches)s)
Width	2.565 metres (8 feet 5.0 inches)s)
Truck type	Brill 21E
No. of motors	2
Power/motor	25 kW (34 hp)

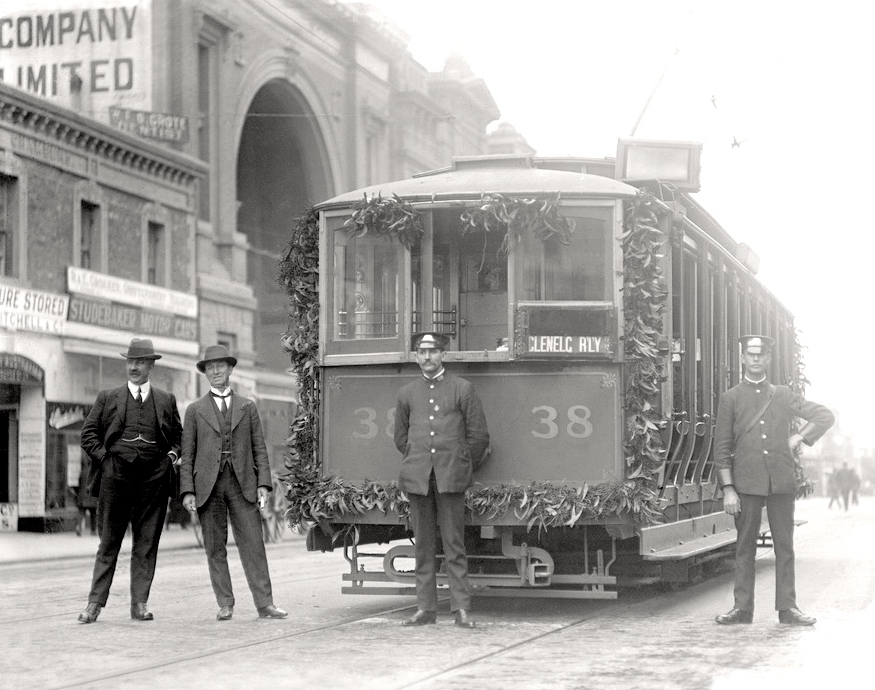
In 1917, possibly on Wattle Day (1 September), a garlanded Type B tram is in Currie Street. MTT General Manager W.G.T. Goodman is on the left. The Glenelg R'l'y sign shows it would turn right down King William Street to Peacock Road, where the "South Terrace" railway line to Glenelg had been foreshortened to limit the public nuisance of steam engines in the city streets.

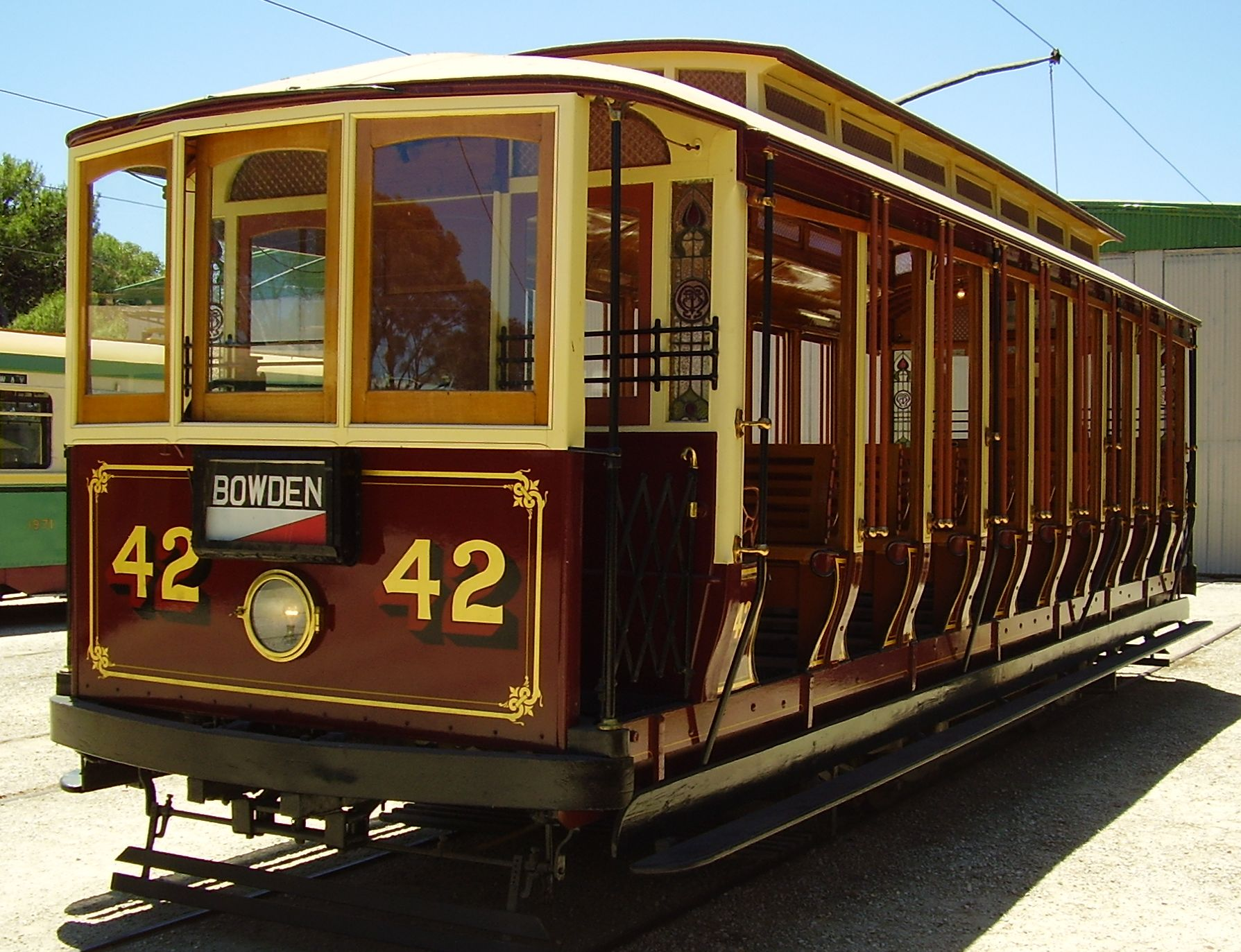
Restored Type B "toast rack" tram 42 at the Tramway Museum, St Kilda

For the MTT's inaugural order in 1909, Duncan & Fraser built another 30 trams, of a US design different from that of the Type A. They too were four-wheeled cars but they lacked the closed saloon compartment of the Type A. All passengers were accommodated on cross-bench seats in one completely open compartment, which soon gave rise to the nickname, "toast racks". The trams carried 50 passengers seated and 50 standing for a crush load of 100, the same total as the Type A trams.

These vehicles, later designated Type B, were popular for summer trips to the beach and to concerts arranged by the MTT at Kensington Gardens, Henley Beach and Semaphore. However, only pull-down canvas blinds offered weather protection and they were inadequate for Adelaide's rainy winter months, which are cooler than in southern California. For that reason they were particularly unpopular with both passengers and conductors in inclement weather. Conductors were also exposed to danger in having to collect fares by walking along the often swaying footboards on the outside of the car.

Eventually 20 of the 30 Type B trams were modified to become "combination trams": a new central closed saloon compartment was built, leaving two facing cross-benches at each end. In 1923 seventeen were designated as Types A1 and 3 as A2. These are described in the next two sections. One "toastrack" was retained for use by the MTT band on the Port Adelaide system and in 1929 one was substantially converted for use during construction of the electrification infrastructure of the Glenelg tram line. (Note: The conversion of Type B car 38 was to a "ballast motor" to remove old railway equipment from the Glenelg line. The entire bodywork and most of the driving compartments were removed; the trolley pole was mounted on a steel post in the middle of the all-flat deck.)

Almost all Type B cars and those converted to Types A1 and A2 were withdrawn from service in 1936 and scrapped in 1946.

=== Type B conversions to Type A1 ===
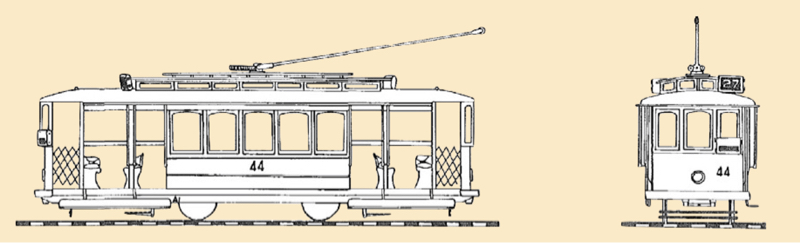

At a glance
Eight years after they were built, 17 of the 30 unpopular open Type B "toast racks" were converted by building a five-windowed saloon where the six central cross-bench seats were – similar to the original Type A cars. Designated later as Type A1, they were converted by an Adelaide coach-building company.

Converted from Type B. Next type acquired: Type C in 1918.

Type A1 details
Introduced	1917
No. rebuilt	17, from Type B
Crush load	101, of whom 40 were seated
Rebuilt by	Duncan & Fraser
Other details	As for Type B

In 1917 the MTT responded to longstanding complaints by crews and passengers that Type B "toast rack" trams were unacceptable in wet or cold weather. Seventeen were converted by Duncan & Fraser (although it is possible that one of these was converted by the MTT) into "California combination" trams, halving the number of exposed seats in the process. This work was done after the Type B conversions to Type A2 had taken place. Under the alphabetical classification system of 1923 they were designated as Type A1.

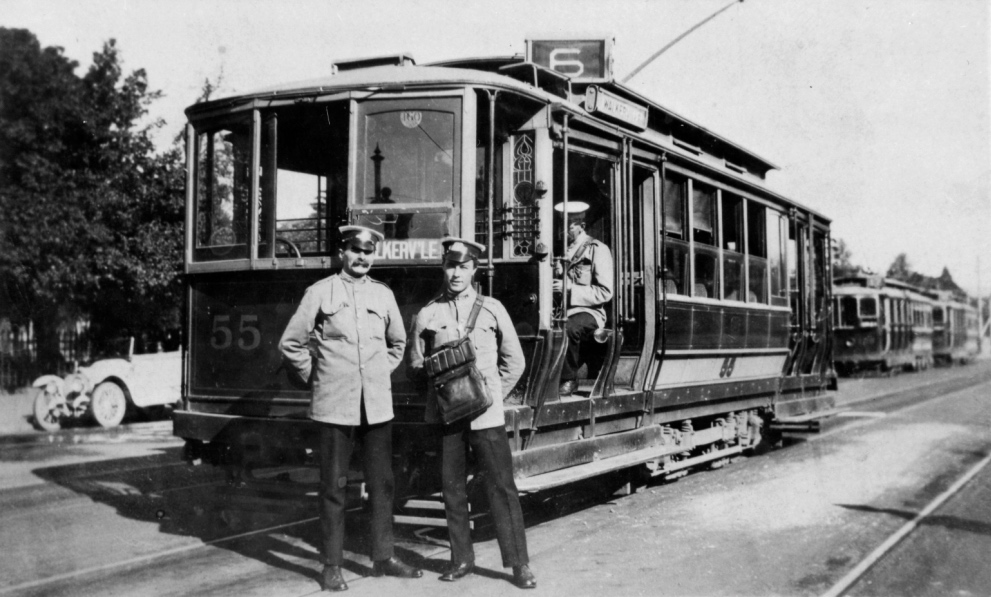
A newly converted Type A1 tram no. 55 in Victoria Square, ca 1917, showing the central closed saloon.

After conversion the trams were similar to the existing Type A – a design also continued in the subsequent Type C cars. Seven were converted for the isolated Port Adelaide tram system operated by the MTT between 1917 and 1935. Type A1 cars were rated with the same passenger capacity (seated and crush load) as the Type A.

Four Type A1 trams were converted into permanently coupled "Bib and Bub" pairs, a wartime labour-saving configuration applied to most Type A cars. These four were the last of the Type A1 cars to be withdrawn from service in 1950, together with the sets of Type A trams not converted back into single car operation.

Type A1 is one of the two MTT tram sub-types not in the collection of the Tram Museum, St Kilda.

=== Type B conversions to Type A2 ===
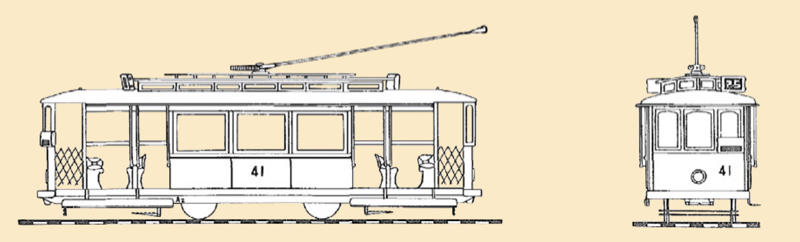

At a glance
A further three of the unpopular Type B "toast racks" were also converted in 1917 – this time by the MTT – in the same way as the Type A1 cars by putting a saloon in the middle, but with three large windows. They were later designated as Type A2.

Converted from Type B. Next type acquired: Type C in 1918.

Type A2 details
Introduced	1917
No. rebuilt	3, from Type B
Crush load	101, of whom 40 were seated
Rebuilt by	MTT Hackney Workshops
Other details	As for Type B

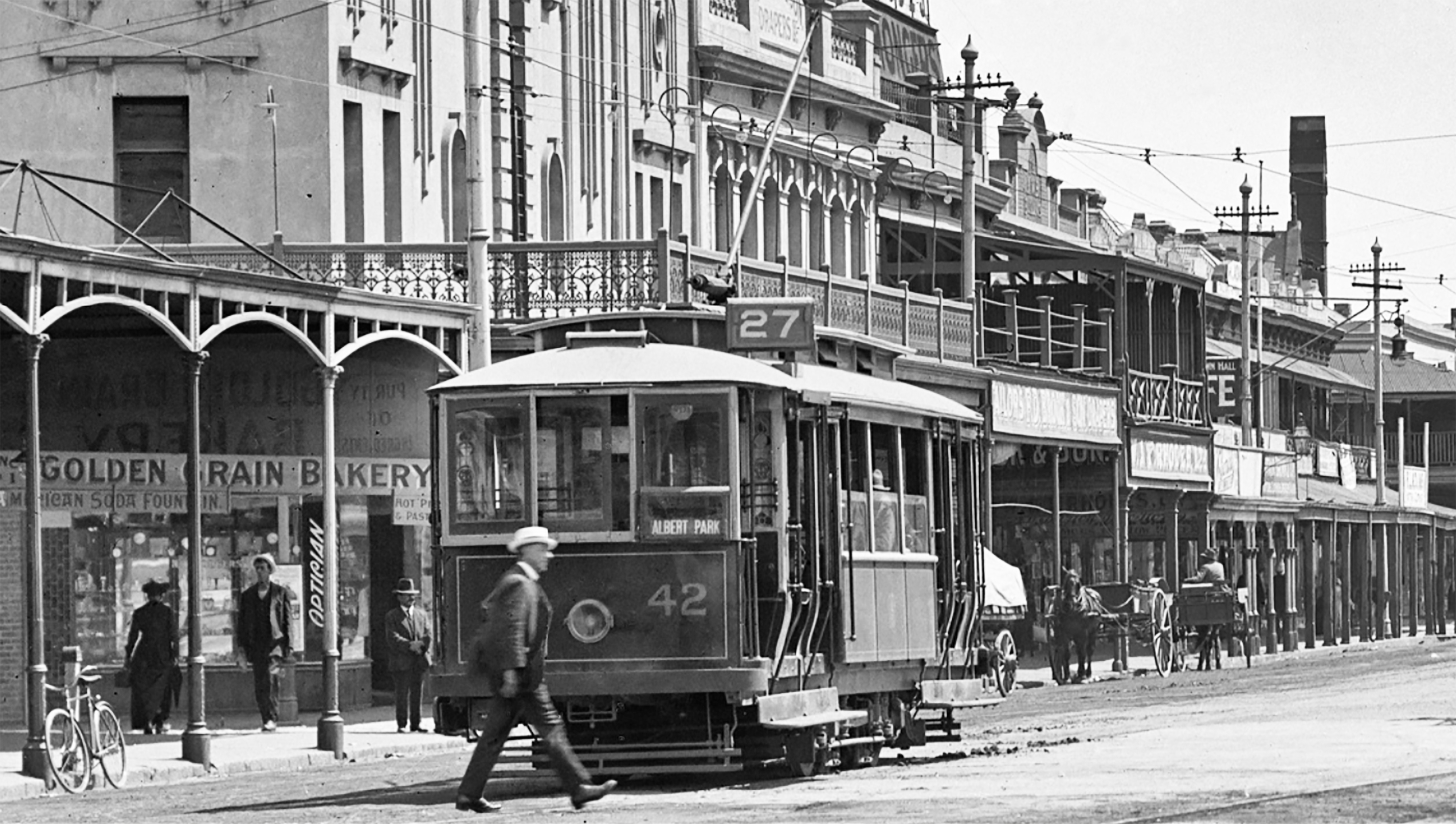
A Type A2 tram in St Vincent Street, Port Adelaide in 1919

The three trams of this type were converted, like the A1, from the unpopular Type B "toast rack" trams, and similarly entered service on the Port Adelaide tram system in 1917. Work on the three cars was undertaken by the MTT at their Hackney workshops rather than by contractors. Rebuilding involved removing six cross-bench seats and their pillars from the centre of the car, then installing a heavily constructed saloon in their place. The trams were essentially the same as the Type A1, but easily distinguishable in having three large windows instead of five small arched ones, and heavy, riveted steel sides. This latter feature led to their nickname, "tanks", after the revolutionary British Army weapons newly deployed in the First World War.

The seating and standing capacity for these trams was the same as for Types A, A1 and C.

The Type A2 trams operated on the isolated Port Adelaide system until its closure in 1935, after which they were transferred to Hackney workshops. In 1946 the bodies of two were sold to private buyers. The third was kept at Hackney workshops until 1958, when it was made available to the Tramway Museum, St Kilda. The museum rebuilt it into its original Type B "toast rack" configuration in preference to retaining its A2 configuration. Consequently, Type A2 is the second of the two MTT tram sub-types not in the museum collection.

=== Type C ===
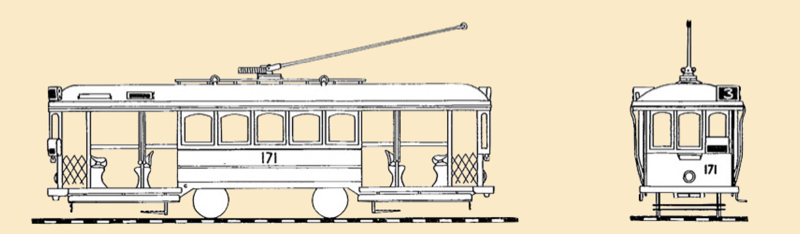

At a glance

These trams received their classification as Type C out of sequence: Type D trams had been introduced eight years before them.

During the First World War, when patronage rose and tram lines were extended, it became urgent to increase the capacity of the fleet, which at that time consisted of 150 cars of Types A, B and D. Wartime austerity mandated only a stop-gap design. Therefore, when 20 were built by an Adelaide coachbuilder in 1918 they did not follow the large bogie car design of 1910 (Type D).
Type C trams were similar in basic design to the Type A of a decade earlier, but with a domed roof. Fitted with powerful traction motors from refitted trams, they were quickly nicknamed after a famous racehorse of the day, "Desert Gold". The last was withdrawn in 1953.

Next type acquired: Type F in 1922, followed by its variant Type F1 in 1925.

Type C details
Introduced	1918–1919
No. built	20
Builder	Duncan & Fraser
Crush load	102, of whom 40 were seated
Weight	11.38 tonnes (11.38 long tons, 12.54 short tons)
Height	3.175 metres (10 feet 5.0 inches)s)
Length	10.363 metres (34 feet 0 inches)s)
Width	2.718 metres (8 feet 11.0 inches)s)
Truck type	Brill 21E
No. of motors	2
Power/motor	37 kW (50 hp)

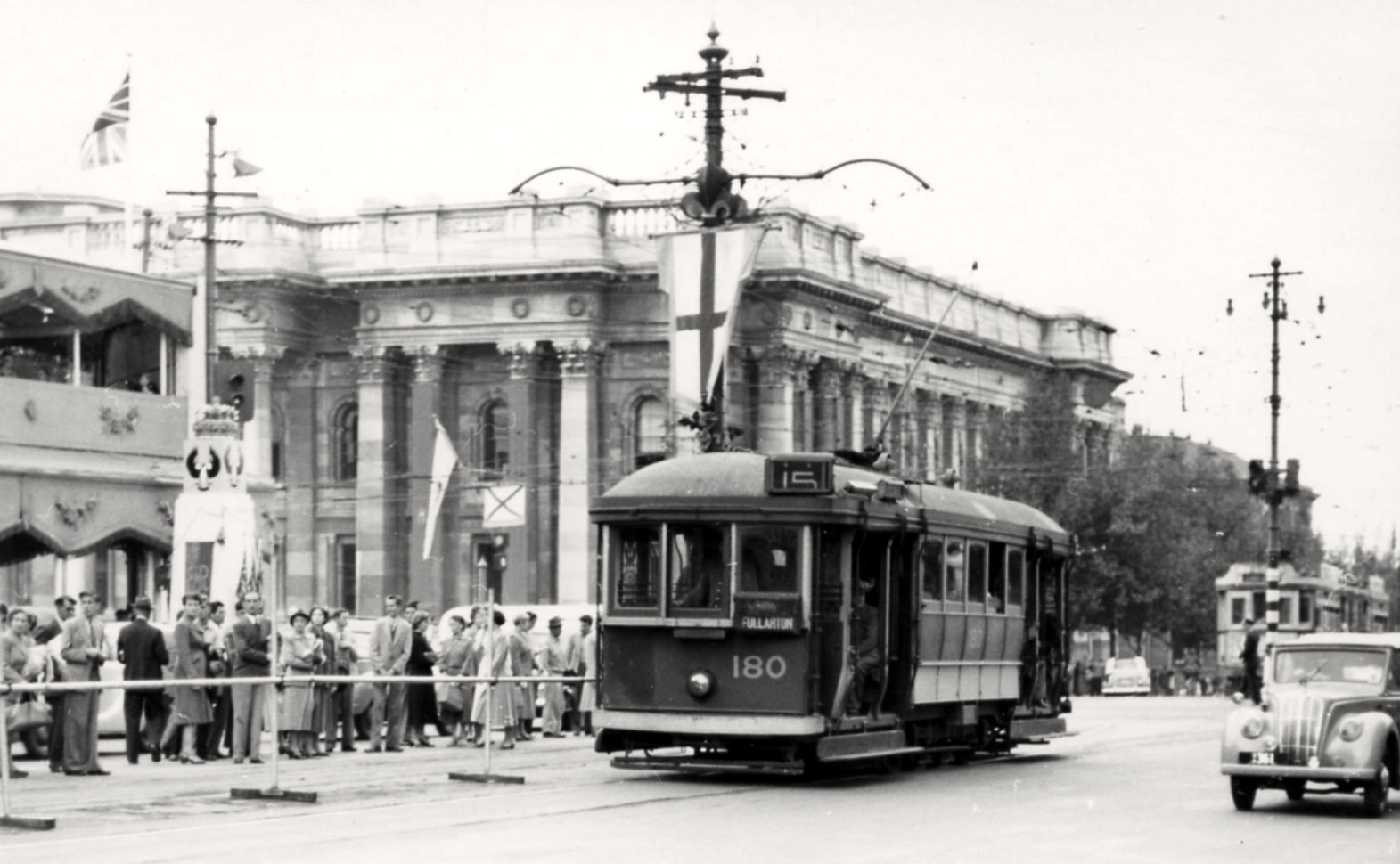
In King William Street is one of the Type C trams that handled peak traffic for the March 1954 Royal Visit, its last period of operation.

During World War 1 the MTT urgently needed more tramcars to handle increases in patronage and route extensions. However, wartime austerity made it impossible to proceed with a planned introduction of large trams. As an interim measure, 20 small combination cars similar to Type A were built by Duncan & Fraser in 1918–1919. These cars, subsequently designated Type C, had a more modern domed roof instead of a clerestory roof. During their construction they were fitted with motors removed from Type E trams. Rated at 37 kW (50 hp) each, two-thirds again higher than the 37 kW (50 hp) motors of the Type A, they enabled much faster acceleration. They soon became popularly known as Desert Gold trams, after a New Zealand racehorse that had won races in Australia at the same time. Their speed combined with the four-wheeled design gave rise to their other nickname, "bouncing billies". They helped the MTT's competition against unlicensed buses in the 1920s, and they were used in peak periods until 1952. Their last use was during the royal visit of March 1954.

=== Type D ===
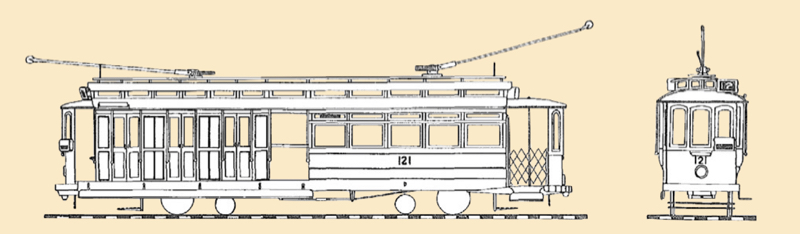

At a glance
As the new electrified routes were being opened, the MTT designed a class of tram much larger than the previous ones, mandating bogies instead of a fixed four-wheel wheelbase.
Seventy such trams were built between 1910 and 1912. Like the earlier trams their wooden bodies were built by a US manufacturer, dismantled before being shipped, and assembled by an Adelaide coachbuilding company. Steel undergear components and electrical equipment were sourced separately from the UK and US.
Half the body was an enclosed saloon, the other half an open area of cross-bench seats. When 20 had been completed, (Note: Later classified as Type E.) a change was made to the design of the remaining 30: sliding doors were fitted to the open area for protection from inclement weather. The order was increased by a further 20, bringing the Type D total to 50 (until 1927, when four nearly identical trams acquired from Melbourne were added). The crush load of both types, 152 passengers, was half as many again as their predecessors.
A huge safety hazard was that conductors were obliged to walk along the external footboards to collect fares because there was no aisle through the middle of the cross-benches.
These trams operated until the street tram system was shut down in 1958.

Next type acquired: Type C in 1918.

Type D details
Introduced	1910–1912
No. built	54, including 4 bought fourth-hand in 1926
Builder	J.G. Brill Company; assembled in Adelaide by A. Pengelley & Co.
Crush load	152, of whom 54 (50 after 1934 conversion) were seated
Weight	Nos. 121–125 and 191–194: 16.56 tonnes (16.30 long tons, 18.26 short tons); Nos. 126–170: 16.05 tonnes (15.80 long tons, 17.70 short tons
Height	3.5305 metres (11 feet 7.00 inches)s)
Length	13.106 metres (43 feet 0 inches)s)
Width	2.2356 m (7.335 ft) 8 3/4 ins)
Truck type	Brill 22E
No. of motors	2
Power per motor	Nos. 121–125 and 191–194: 48 kW (64 hp); Nos. 126–170: 37 kW (50 hp)

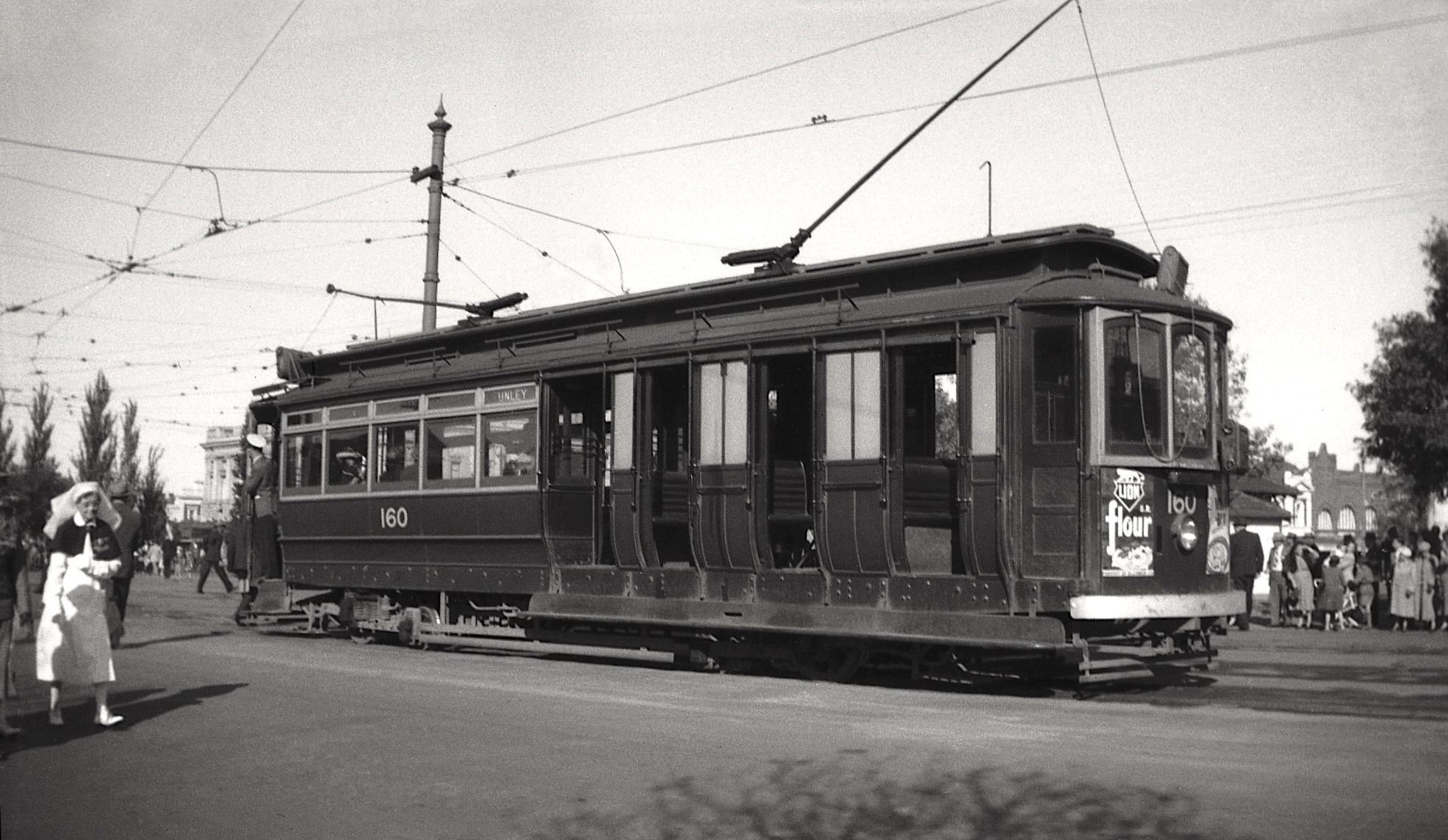
Type D tram no. 160 in the north-east quadrant of Victoria Square on the morning of Anzac Day, 25 April 1956.

In May 1909, soon after the opening of the first electric lines, it became evident that 100 cars would not be enough to meet traffic demand. In May 1909 the MTT called for tenders for trams it had designed which were much larger than the existing four-wheeled cars.

Local tenders were much higher in price than others and the Trust declined to accept them on commercial grounds. A Melbourne company, Noyes Brothers (Melbourne) Pty Ltd, eventually won the contract for 50 cars (later increased to 70). Their tender stated that the car bodies would be manufactured by the J.G. Brill Company in Philadelphia, erected there, dismantled and packed, and re-erected in Australia. Prompted by public opposition to work going out of the state, the MTT asked that assembly be in South Australia. Noyes Brothers then negotiated with Adelaide coachbuilders A. Pengelley & Co. to erect the bodies under their supervision at the same tendered price, reported in The Register as being £36,673 and 13 shillings. (Note: Based on the Retail Price Index calculated by the Australian Bureau of Statistics, 36,673 pounds in Australia in 1910 equates to 5.00 million Australian dollars in 2018. The per-tram cost of 733 pounds equates to 100 thousand Australian dollars.) As with previous trams, running gear and electrical equipment were necessarily sourced from the UK and US.

The 70 trams, built between 1910 and 1912, could carry 154 passengers in total (54 seated and 100 standing). When 20 had been completed, a change was made to the design of the remaining 30 (subsequently increased to 50): sliding doors were fitted to enclose each row of bench seats to give for protection from inclement weather. These trams came to be designated as Type D ("closed combination metropolitan bogie cars"); the first 20 became Type E.

The design of these larger cars featured maximum traction trucks, recognisable by one pair of wheels being much smaller in diameter (508 mm or 20 inches) than the other (838 mm or 33 inches, the same diameter as on the earlier types). The driving axle, with large wheels, was driven; the other was not. By locating the truck pivot off-centre, more weight rested on the driving axle, providing greater traction. The smaller wheels guided the truck on the rails, bearing a relatively small portion of the weight.

A further four almost identical trams, which Duncan & Fraser had built in 1912 for tramways trusts in Melbourne, were acquired by the MTT in 1927 and incorporated into the D fleet. (Note: The trams were purchased initially by the Prahran & Malvern Tramways Trust, which then sold them to the Hawthorn Tramways Trust in 1916. In 1920, when the Melbourne & Metropolitan Tramways Board (M&MTB) acquired all of the municipal tramway trusts in Melbourne; the cars were designated as the O class. By late 1926 the M&MTB had enough standard W class trams to enable them to dispose of smaller groups of non-standard cars. Since the O class were unpopular, they were among the first cars to be sold. The MTT purchased them willingly in 1926 since they were very similar to their Type D. With appreciably higher steps than other Adelaide trams, they were unpopular with some passengers.)

Since there was no means of moving along the tram inside the cross-bench area, conductors had to make their way along the external footboards to collect fares while the tram was in motion – a task even more dangerous in cold or rainy weather when the sliding doors had to be opened. In 1934, after conductors had been injured while collecting fares, a centre aisle was cut through the centre bulkhead and through four of the six cross-bench seats of these trams.

The Type D trams operated in regular service until the street network was closed in 1958.

=== Type E ===
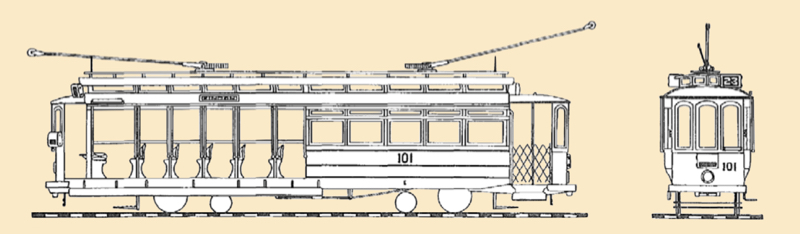

At a glance
In 1909 twenty of the new bogie combination trams had been built before the design was changed to include sliding side doors to protect passengers from the elements. The doors were not retro-fitted on cars that had just been built. Classified as Type E, the trams retained their completely open cross-bench seating until 1936, when they were enclosed, becoming Type E1. Until then, as on the Type D, conductors were obliged to walk along the external footboards to collect fares from passengers sitting on the cross-benches.
Some Type E trams remained in service, like their Type D counterparts, until the street tram system was shut down in 1958.

Next types built: Type D in 1911 then Type C in 1918.

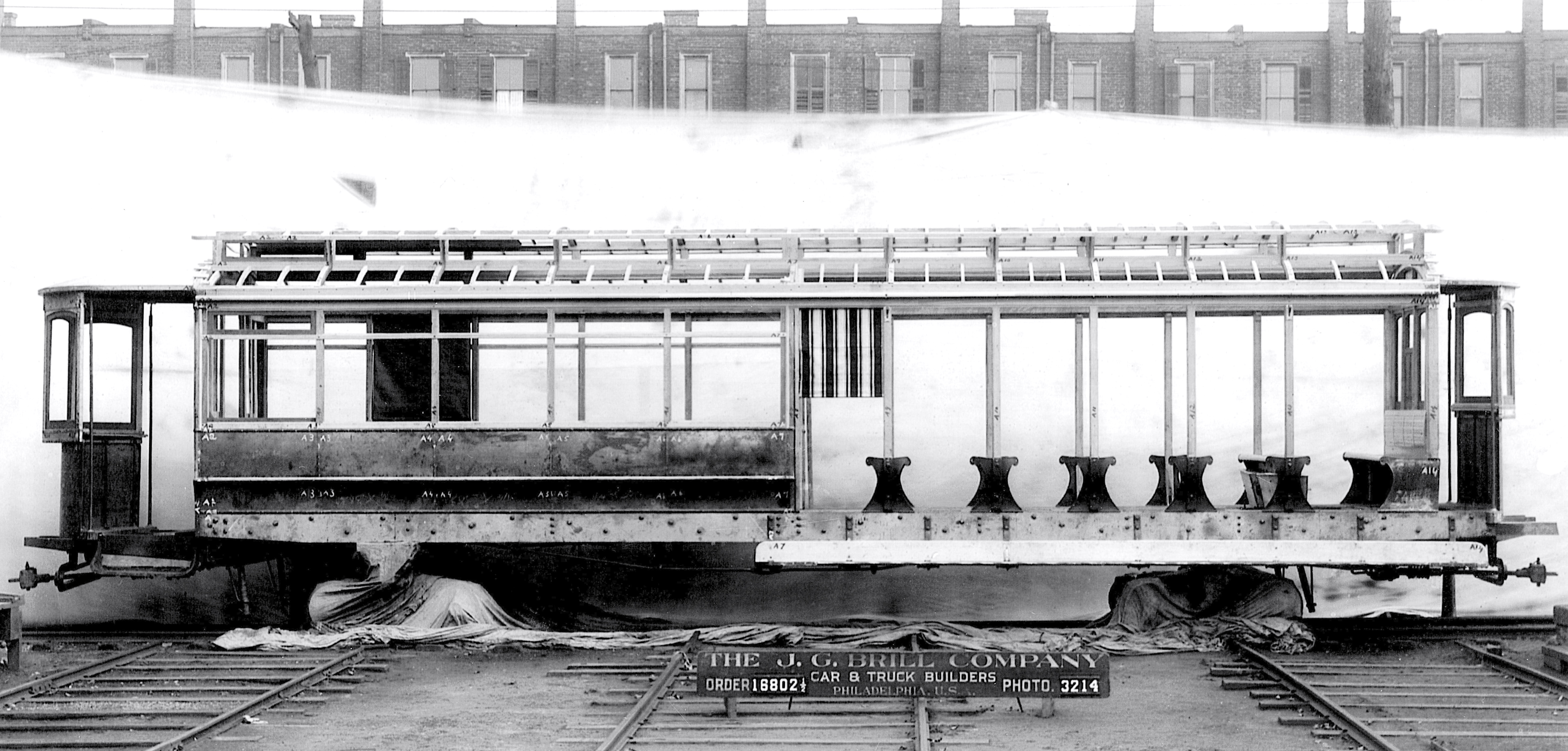
A works photo of the body of a tram that became the MTT's Type E, taken at the J.G. Brill Company factory in Philadelphia. Each component is marked with a letter and number. The trams were assembled in Adelaide to assuage public opinion about foreign imports.

Type E details
Introduced	1910–1912
No. built	20
Builder	J.G. Brill Company; assembled in Adelaide by A. Pengelley & Co.
Crush load	152, of whom 54 were seated
Weight	14.73 tonnes (14.50 long tons, 16.24 short tons)
Height	3.531 metres (11 feet 7.0 inches)s)
Length	13.106 metres (43 feet 0 inches)s)
Width	2.236 m (7.34 ft) 8 3/4 ins)
Truck type	Brill 22E
Power/motor	37 kW (50 hp)

Of the seventy-car "combination metropolitan bogie cars" ordered from A. Pengelley & Co. in 1910, the first twenty (as Type E) were very similar to the Type D but the open section had only roller blinds to protect passengers from bad weather. Continuous crossbench seats required the conductor to collect fares from the footboard. The Type E trams had the same passenger load rating as the Type D: 54 seated and 100 standing. The trams were especially popular for taking families to picnics at Burnside and Magill at a charge of 24 shillings ($A2.20) for the whole group.

Local opinion was strongly opposed to building new trams outside of South Australia. Consequently, Type E trams were built by the J.G. Brill Company in Philadelphia, then imported in parts and assembled by Pengelley from 1910 to 1912. As before, mechanical and electrical components were sourced from the UK and US.

In 1918, all Type E cars were fitted with 65 hp traction motors, replacing motors rated at 50 hp.

During 1936 the open area on all Type E cars was enclosed by an extended saloon. The converted cars were designated Type E1.

Some Type E trams survived in revenue service until the close of street tram operation in 1958.

=== Type E conversions to Type E1 ===
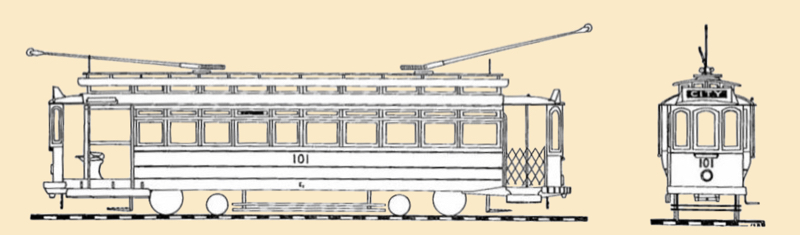

At a glance
In 1936, with the Great Depression preventing funding of new trams, the saloons of all 20 Type E cars were extended to reduce passengers' exposure to the weather and end the practice of conductors having to collect fares from the external footboards. The converted trams were reclassified as Type E1.

Converted from Type E. Next type acquired: Type H1 prototype in 1953.

Type E1 details
Introduced	1936
No. rebuilt	20
Rebuilt by	MTT Hackney Workshops
Crush load	152, of whom 49 were seated
Weight	16.05 tonnes (15.80 long tons, 17.70 short tons)
No. of motors	2
Power/motor	48 kW (64 hp)
Other details	As for Type E

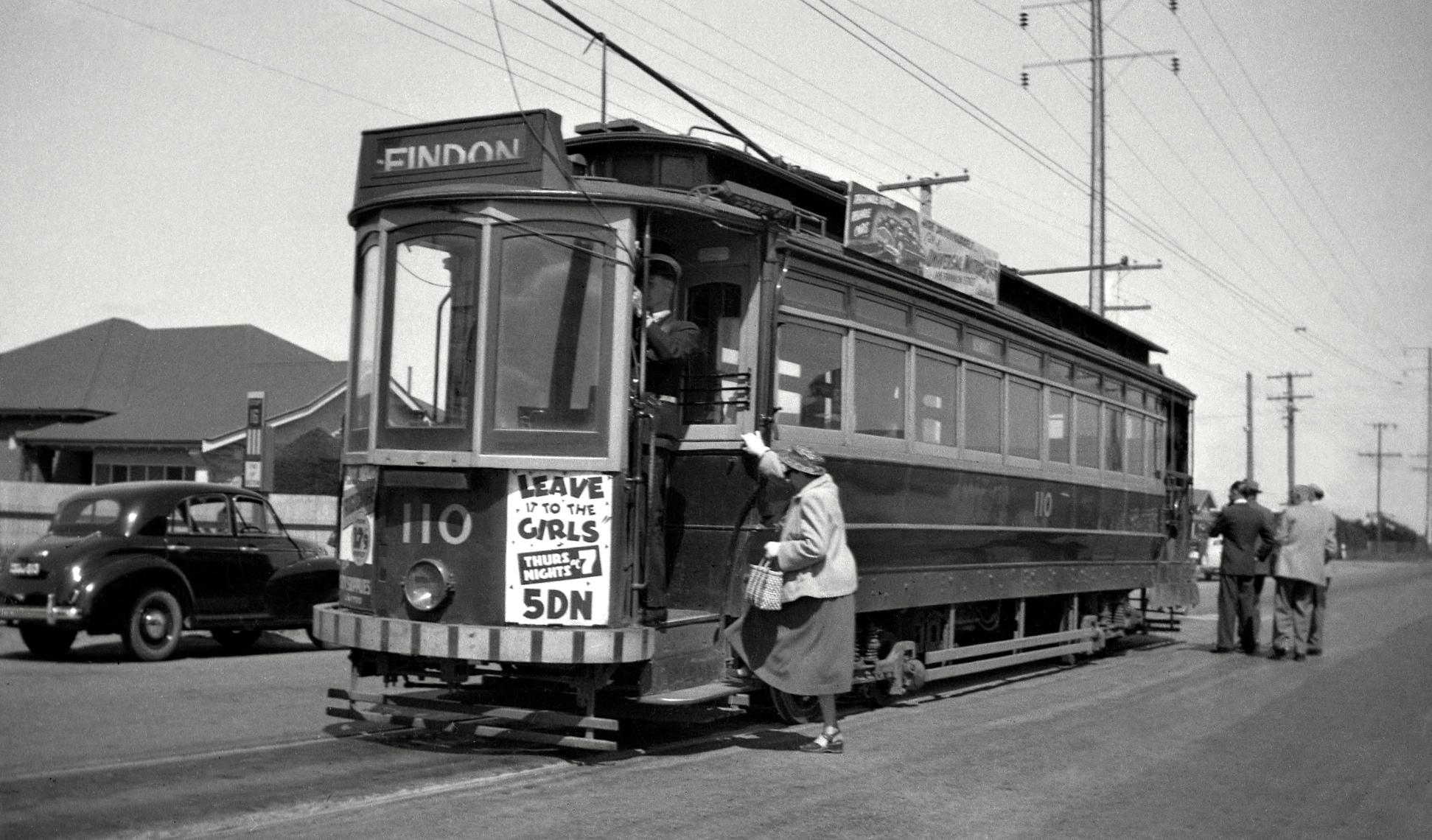
Type E1 tram no. 110 at Findon terminus on the line's last day of operation, 18 October 1953. The woman boarding demonstrates the height of the steps that had to be negotiated on these trams.

By the mid-1930s, more than half of the MTT's cars were almost 30 years old. The enormous financial stringencies of the Great Depression prevented the construction of new cars, but improvements were made to older cars at the MTT's workshops. The conversion of all Type E trams to Type E1 involved removing the crossbenches and extending the saloon for the entire car length except for one retained cross-bench seat behind the motorman's bulkhead. The original (non-smoking) saloon received new upholstered seating; the removed timber saloon seats were transferred to the new saloon.

The converted trams were immediately unpopular because there was only one small door at each end, making them difficult to board in rush hours. However, enclosing the open section eliminated the severe safety hazard that external footboards posed to conductors.

=== Type F and its variant F1 ===
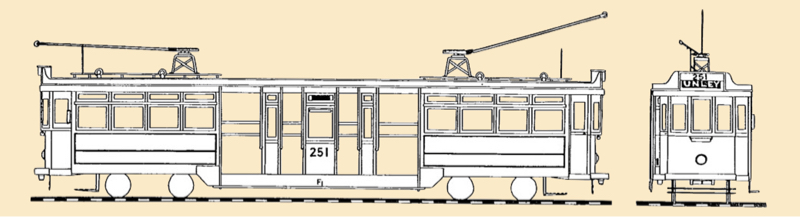

At a glance
F and F1 were the classifications allocated to two almost identical designs built over a span of nine years, starting in 1921–22. The first batch (Type F) had a combined steel and timber frame; the second (Type F1) had an all-steel underframe. Both variants are described here.

By 1921 the MTT had developed its first design to meet the specific requirements of the Adelaide system: a bogie tram with fast-loading access for six lines of passengers and a carrying capacity two-thirds greater than all but one of its predecessors. However, the severe constraints of the First World War (which had led to 20 Type C cars being built as a stop-gap) prevented construction from starting until 1921. During the next nine years 84 were built.

These speedy, comfortable Type F and F1 trams took the leading role in the street tram system until it was shut down in 1958.

Next type acquired: Type G in 1925.

Types F and F1 details
Introduced	Type F: 1921–1925; Type F1 variants: 1925–1929
No. built	84 (Type F: 50; Type F1: 34).
Builder	Types F and F1: A. Pengelley & Co. (qty 81); Type F1: MTT Hackney workshops (qty 3)
Crush load	170, of whom 60 were seated (some: 56 after 1953)
Weight	Nos. 201–225: 19.96 tonnes (19.64 long tons, 22.00 short tons); Nos. 226–250: 20.02 tonnes (19.70 long tons, 22.06 short tons); Nos. 251–262: 20.33 tonnes (20.01 long tons, 22.41 short tons); Nos. 263–284: 20.42 tonnes (20.10 long tons, 22.51 short tons)
Height	3.048 metres (10 feet 0 inches)s)
Length	14.935 metres (49 feet 0 inches)s)
Width	2.692 metres (8 feet 10.0 inches)s)
Truck type	Nos. 201–262: Brill 77E2; Nos. 263–284: Commonwealth Steel
No. of motors	4
Power per motor	Nos. 201–225: 30 kW (40 hp); Nos. 226–250: 37 kW (50 hp); Nos. 251–262: 30 kW (40 hp); Nos. 263–284: 37 kW (50 hp)

At last released from the severe constraints of the First World War, the MTT's chief engineer and general manager W.G.T. Goodman designed a new "dropcentre" tram that could be loaded and unloaded very quickly by six lines of passengers. They entered or left the tram's open section, which had a lower floor than the enclosed saloons on either side, made possible by more modern running gear that took up less space.

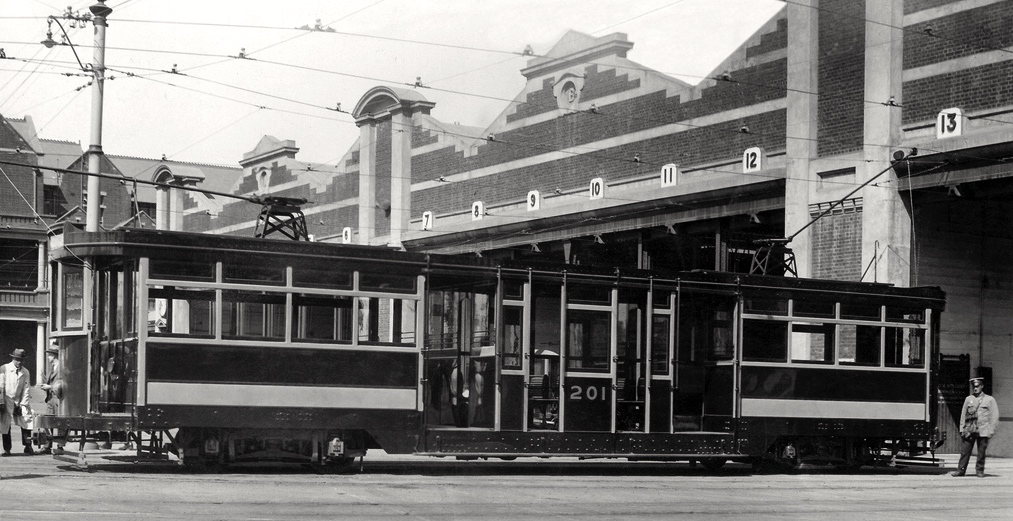
No. 201, the first of 84 Type F and F1 trams, outside Tram Barn C at the Hackney Road depot on 17 March 1922. MTT General Manager W.G.T. Goodman, in his hat and characteristic white dustcoat, is near the front of the car.

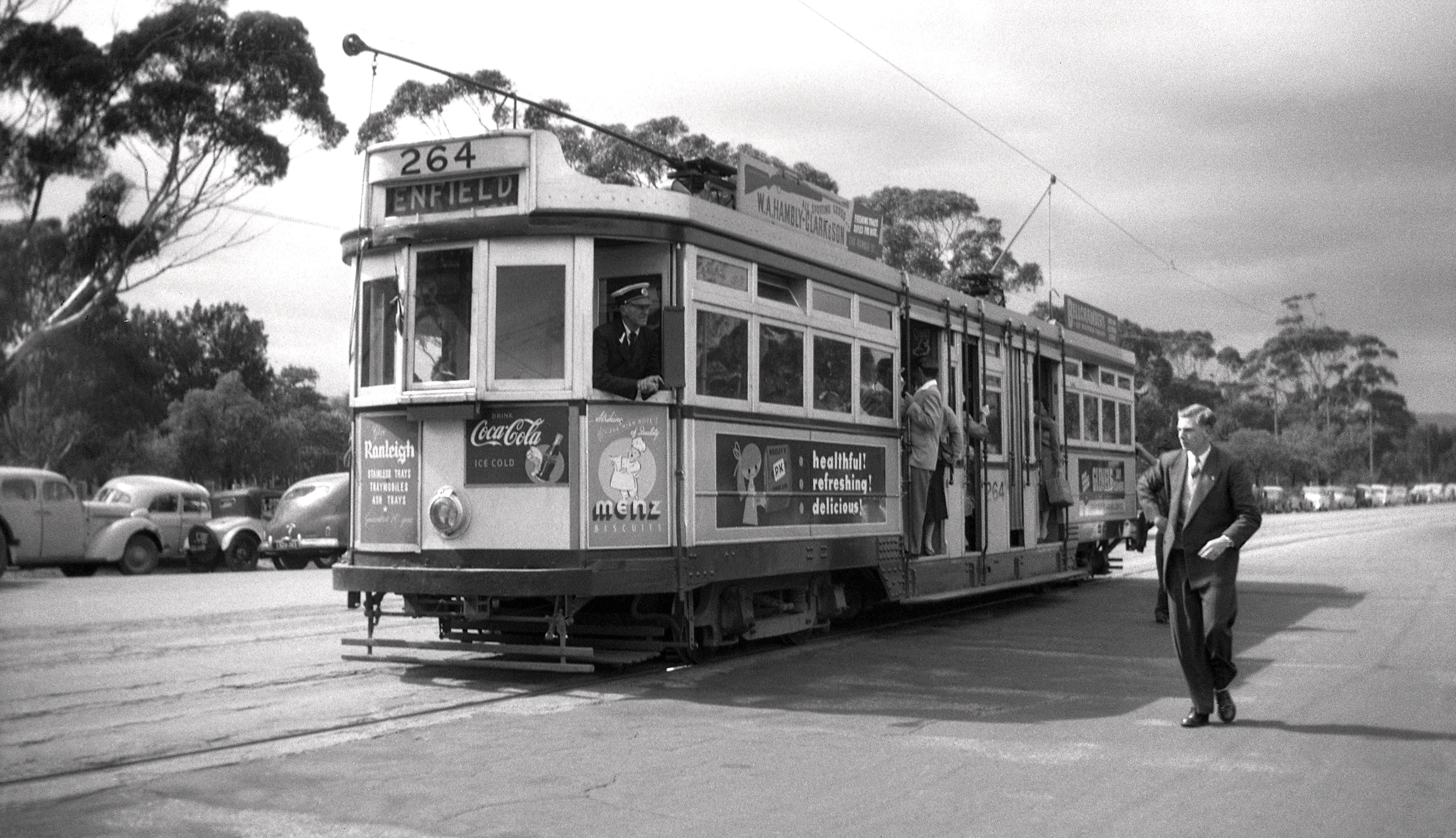
Type F1 tram no. 264 in silver and carnation red livery waiting at Peacock Road with a full passenger load, near the intersection with South Terrace on 9 November 1957. The driver may be awaiting a tram on the line from Glenelg, which joins his line just ahead.

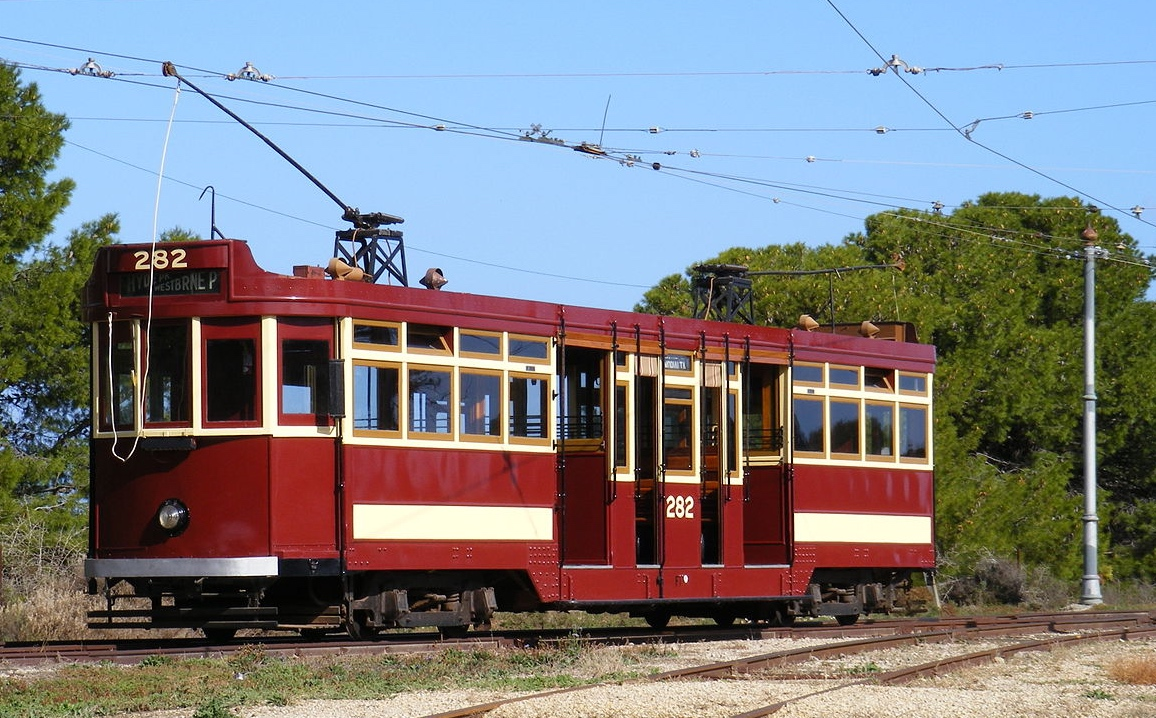
Type F1 tram 282, restored and operational at the Tramway Museum, St Kilda

These Type F trams and their variant Type F1 seated 60 and had standing room for a further 110, totalling a crush load of 170 passengers, two-thirds more than all but one of their predecessor types. They were a highly popular design, providing much more space and comfort than previous MTT trams. Their acceleration and braking was significantly better than their predecessors' on account of a 40-hp traction motor on each of the four axles (on which all wheels were the same 673 mm (26.5 in) diameter), and air brakes (the first to be fitted from inception).

A total of 84 were built, making them the most common trams used in Adelaide. Local coach builders A. Pengelley & Co. built the initial 50 cars in 1921–22, a further 11 of almost identical design (designated Type F1) in 1925, and 20 more F1 cars in 1928. The MTT built one Type F1 in 1927 and two more in 1929. The main difference between the two types lay in the construction of the underframe: the Type F cars combined steel and timber-frame construction whereas the Type F1 cars had an all-steel underframe. With so many trams of these types in service, many detail variations occurred in the fleet.

In 1929, two cars were fitted with additional air brake pipes to haul an unusual type of trailer – horse transport cars – on the Glenelg line between Adelaide and Morphettville Racecourse.

From October 1953, about half the trams in the Type F and F1 fleet were repainted from their tuscan-red and cream livery into silver and carnation red. Most of the repainted cars – and a few that were not repainted – had an emergency exit door fitted behind the motorman's compartment, reducing the seating capacity in these trams from 60 to 56.

Whether a passenger sat "inside" or not was governed by a strict custom. As John Radcliffe and Christopher Steele observed:

These cars were important in the development of an unusual custom by passengers of practising the de facto segregation of the sexes. The habit was quite without legal foundation, yet it was a custom firmly entrenched until the trams were replaced by buses. Passengers who sat in the wrong compartments were regarded as something in the nature of "social outcasts" by their fellow passengers. Men always occupied the centre (smoking) section of "dropcentre" cars, while women and children occupied the end saloons. Even married couples invariably split up after boarding the car. Father always purchased the tickets from the conductor as he passed through the centre of the car. When the conductor reached the end saloon, Mother would point out, amid much arm waving, which of the male passengers outside was her husband. Inspectors who periodically boarded the cars to check that everyone had tickets consequently had a difficult time.

The dropcentre cars had the leading role over the entire Adelaide street tram network for 37 years until the system, with the exception of the Glenelg line, was shut down on 22 November 1958. They were especially well suited to carry the crowds associated with race meetings, football matches and the agricultural show at the Wayville Showground.

The fate of the street trams was the final consequence of many factors at work, including the fact that the number of cars registered in South Australia increased from 100,000 in 1946 to 240,000 in 1956, while during the same time the number of riders carried by all forms of public road passenger transport in Adelaide dropped from 100 million to 60 million.

More information about the closure of the street network is in the article Municipal Tramways Trust.

=== Type G ===
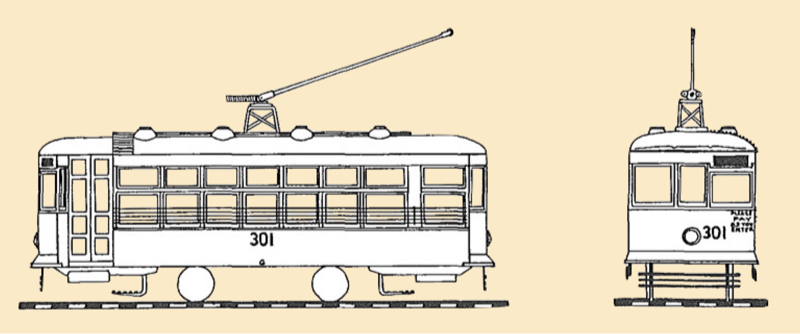

At a glance
In 1925, rather than deploy larger trams on the isolated, low-traffic tramway system radiating from Port Adelaide to Semaphore, Largs, Rosewater and Albert Park, the MTT bought four economical four-wheeled trams, operated by one man. They were the shortest cars operated by the MTT, with just 32 passengers seated and space for 18 standing. Designated Type G, they were built by J.G. Brill and Co. of Philadelphia and assembled in the MTT workshops.

Next type acquired: Type H in 1929.

Type G details
Introduced	1924
No. built	4
Builder	J.G. Brill Company
Crush load	50, of whom 32 were seated
Weight	7.7 tonnes (7.6 long tons, 8.5 short tons)
Height	3.092 m (10.14 ft) 1 3/4 ins)
Length	8.547 m (28.04 ft) 0 1/2 ins)
Width	2.375 m (7.79 ft) 9 1/2 ins)
Truck type	Brill 79E1
No. of motors	2
Power/motor	19 kW (25 hp)

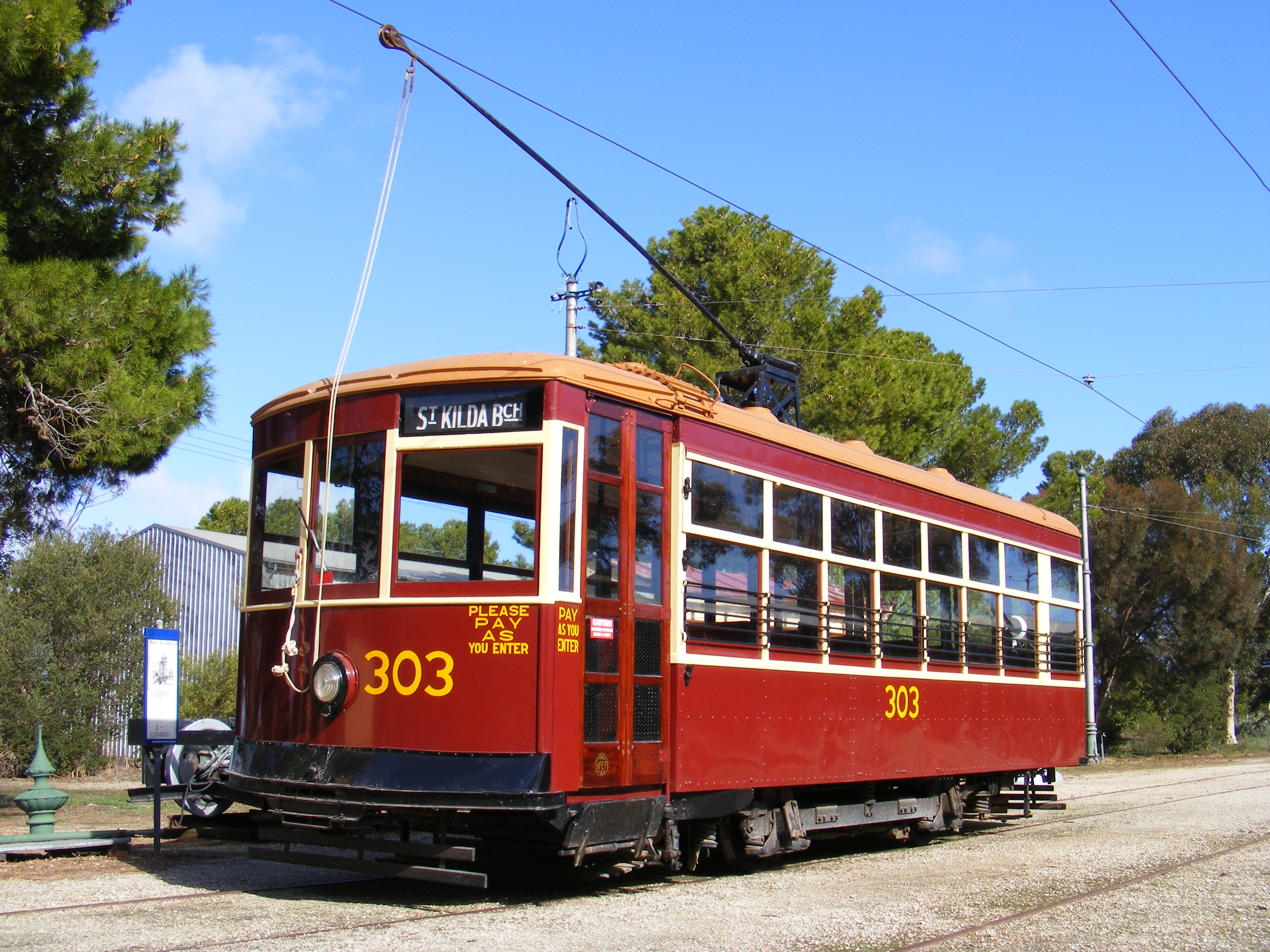
Type G "Birney safety car" 303 at the Tramway Museum, St Kilda

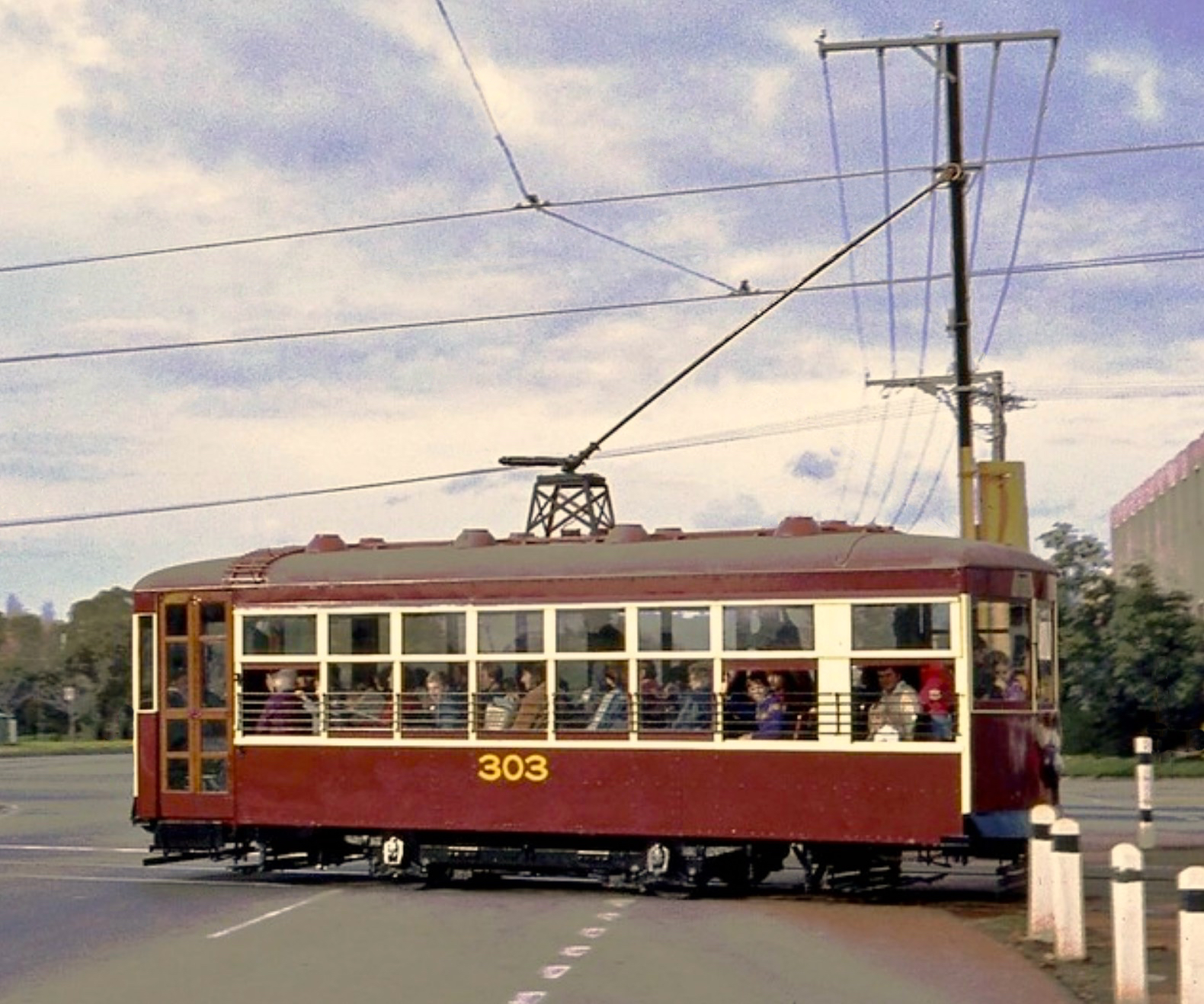
Type G car 303, on the Glenelg tram line, runs over a level crossing on Greenhill Road during an Adelaide "centenary of transport" festival in 1978

Four Type G cars were built by the J.G. Brill Company in Philadelphia in 1924 and were placed in service in 1925. They were the company's standard "Birney safety car" – named after their designer, Charles Birney – that had become popular on lightly trafficked lines in the US. They incorporated several safety features and used little power, but owing to their small wheelbase were said to ride "like a rowboat out to sea". The trams filled a niche demand for economic operation over the lightly patronised Port Adelaide system, (Note: The network ran from Port Adelaide to Semaphore, Largs, Rosewater and Albert Park.) carrying only 50 passengers. They incorporated folding doors and steps and several safety features, and used little power, but due to their small wheelbase tended to "ride like a rowboat out to sea". They were the only trams in Adelaide able to be operated by the driver alone, doing away with the need for a conductor. Until the arrival of the 100 Series Flexity and 200 Series Citadis trams more than 80 years later, they were also the only trams in Adelaide to be entirely constructed overseas.

The Type G trams ran for 10 years before the Port Adelaide system was closed in 1935. The following year, the four were sold to the State Electricity Commission of Victoria for use in Geelong, joining two other, new, Birney cars. In 1947 the Commission transferred the four former Adelaide cars to its Bendigo tramways, to be followed by the remaining two in 1949. There, the trams were in revenue service until 1972 when the system was closed down.

=== Type H (later, 300 Series) ===
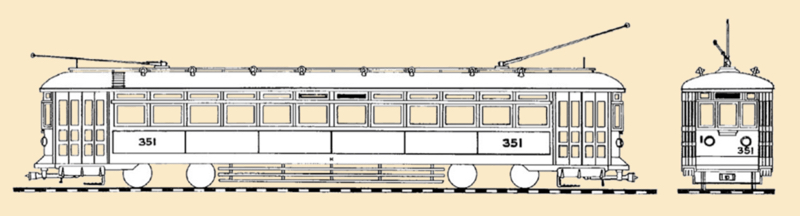

At a glance
In 1929 the MTT took ownership of one of the steam railway lines from Adelaide to Glenelg and converted it from broad gauge to standard gauge and installed electric overhead wires. To provide a fast service on the 10.9 km (6.8 mi) line – 85% of it in an exclusive corridor – 30 Type H trams were designed and purchased.
The trams were long, fully enclosed saloon cars with power-operated doors and bottom steps at either end, and they could run in coupled sets. To the travelling public they became known as "Glenelg" and "Bay" trams. They were designed by MTT chief engineer and general manager W.G.T. Goodman, whose starting point was the interurban designs of North America since the Glenelg line would allow relatively high speeds on its reservation. Considered "state of the art" in the 1920s the trams, refurbished from time to time, remained popular for 79 years.
In 2006, following a major upgrade to the Glenelg line, new contemporary trams were progressively delivered and the Bay trams were withdrawn from daily revenue service – the last in 2008. All but five, which ran occasionally on special occasions until 2015, were sold or donated to various entities. The final two were placed in departmental storage in 2017 and donated to the Tramway Museum, St Kilda in 2021.

Next type acquired: Type H1 prototype in 1953.

Type H (later, 300 Series) details
Introduced	1929
No. built	30
Body	A. Pengelley & Co., Edwardstown, South Australia
Crush load	170, including 64 seated
Weight	23.5 tonnes (23.1 long tons, 25.9 short tons)
Height	3.597 m (11.80 ft) 9 5/8 ins)
Length	17.170 metres (56 feet 4.0 inches)s) over bumpers
Width	2.692 m (8.83 ft) 6 1/2 ins)
Truck type	Frames by Commonwealth Steel (MCB pattern), fabricated by Bradford Kendall Ltd, Alexandria, New South Wales; other components MTT Hackney workshops
Traction motors	As built: Dick, Kerr & Co., Preston, England; as re-motored: The English Electric Co. Ltd, Preston, England
No. of motors	4
Power/motor	As built: 45 kW (60 hp); as re-motored: 48 kW (64 hp)
Control and air brake equipment	General Electric Company, Schenectady, USA
Trolley-pole bases and Tomlinson couplers	Ohio Brass Co., Mansfield, Ohio, USA
Pantographs (1986)	Austbreck
Seat mechanisms	G.D. Peters & Co. Ltd, Slough, England
Seat backs, cushions and sun blinds	C.W. Robertson & Co., Adelaide, South Australia
Source: Andrews (2014), p. 54 et seq.

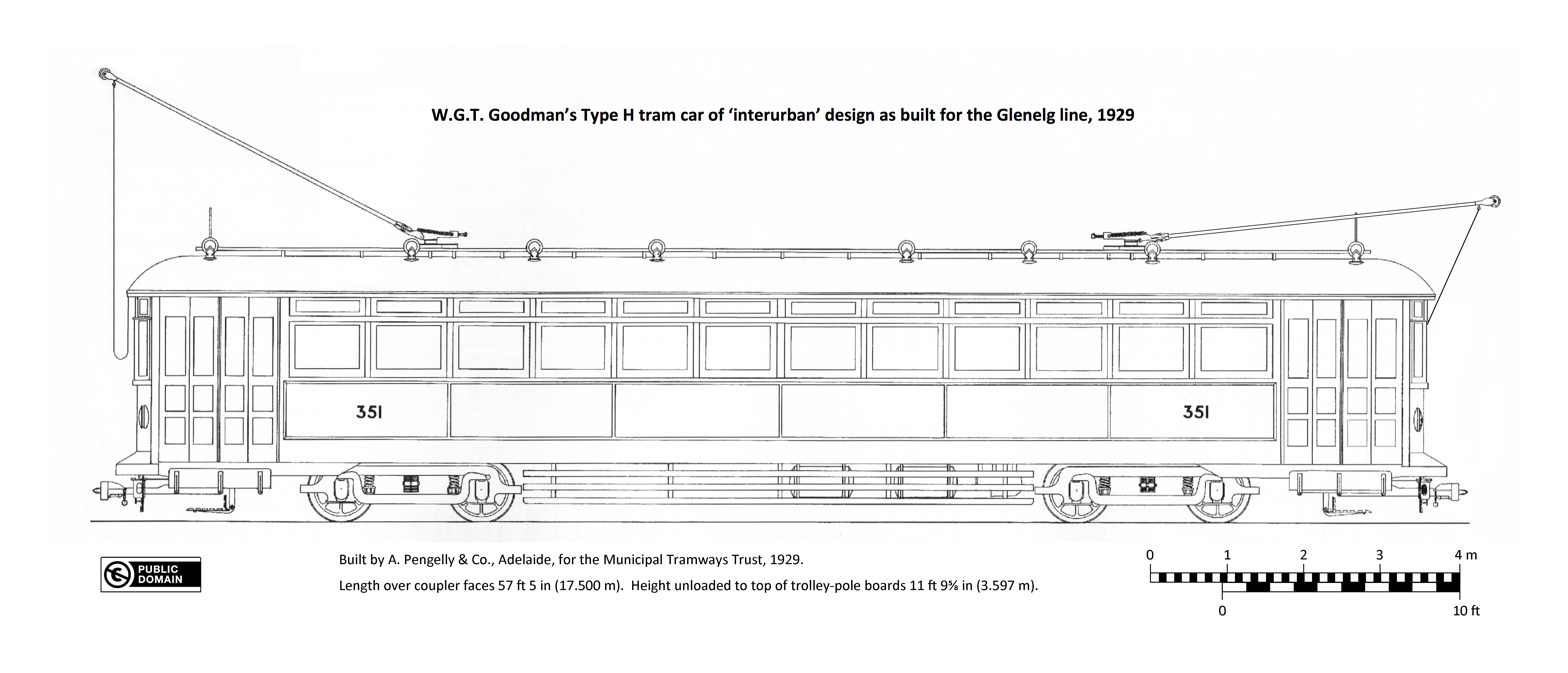
W.G.T. Goodman, MTT chief engineer and general manager, based his design for the 1929 Type H trams on North American interurban styles.

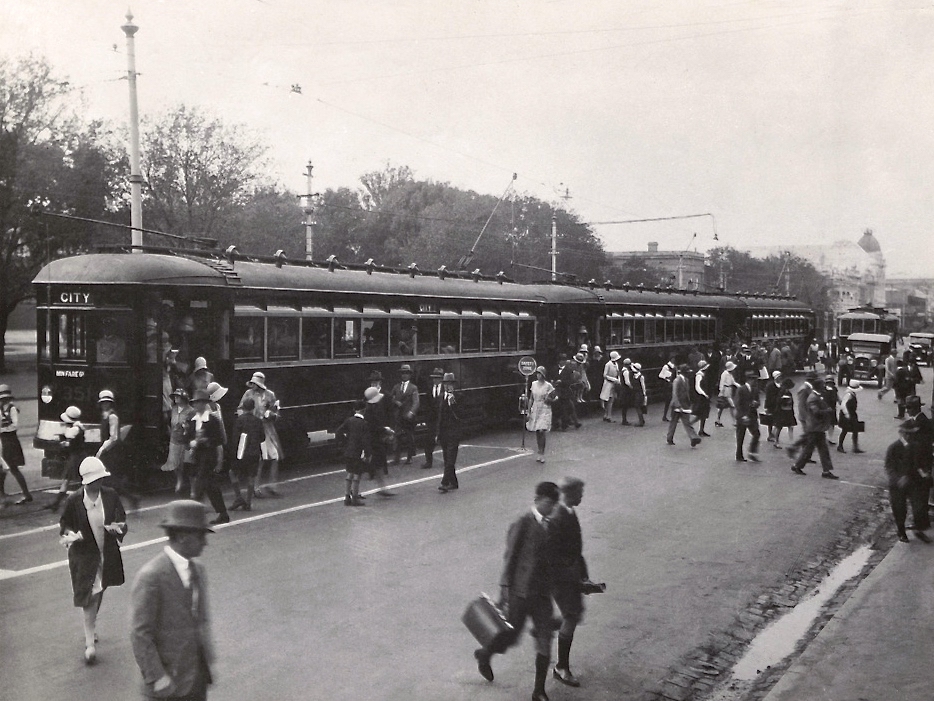
Triple-coupled Type H trams, totalling 172 feet (52 m) in length and led by no. 351, at the Victoria Square terminus about 1930.

In 1929, fortuitously just before the onset of the Great Depression, (Note: Economic conditions in South Australia had begun to deteriorate some months before the depression began. In 1928, 15% of union members were unemployed – twice the national average.) the MTT acquired the 56-year-old steam-hauled double-track South Terrace railway from the South Australian Railways. It was to be electrified with overhead catenary at 600 volts direct current. Track was re-laid to 1,435 mm (4.708 ft) 8 1/2 in) standard gauge, the same as other Adelaide tram lines. By December of that year the track had been refurbished and gauge-converted, a flyover bridge built over the railway to Melbourne at Goodwood, and electrification infrastructure installed. (Note: When the line was closed for construction in April 1929, work had already been in progress for three months. It continued for another 10 months, during which time the North Terrace railway line provided passenger services.)

To provide a fast service on the 10.9 km (6.8 mi) line between Adelaide and the beachside suburb of Glenelg – 85% of it in an exclusive corridor – 30 long, fully enclosed end-loading saloon cars were designed and built. They were in everyday service for 70 years after they entered service in December 1929.

North American influence

The construction of the Glenelg tramway and its rolling stock was probably MTT chief engineer and general manager W.G.T. Goodman's greatest achievement. Though Goodman was an Englishman by birth, education and early professional experience, many of his ideas reflected a strong North American influence. In terms of rolling stock design it was evident not only in the Type H cars but also in the stock US streetcar designs, both in layout and detail, that he favoured in 1908–1912 for the inaugural Adelaide street tram system and in his 1918 design (not built) for fast-loading street trams. The design of the Type H was typical of many hundreds of interurban cars operating in North America at the time. (Note: Examples of similar (though shorter) designs of interurbans were the Sandwich, Windsor and Amherstburg Railway's cars numbered 301–304 and the Perley–Thomas Car Co.'s 800 Series for the New Orleans Public Service, Inc.) The term "interurban" was applied to vehicles heavier and faster than urban trams ("streetcars" in North America), operating in city streets and on private right-of-way between built-up areas. Goodman had proposed a similar design for electrification of the line twenty years earlier, but the electrification bill introduced into the South Australian Parliament was defeated, as was a similar bill two years later.

A memorable experience

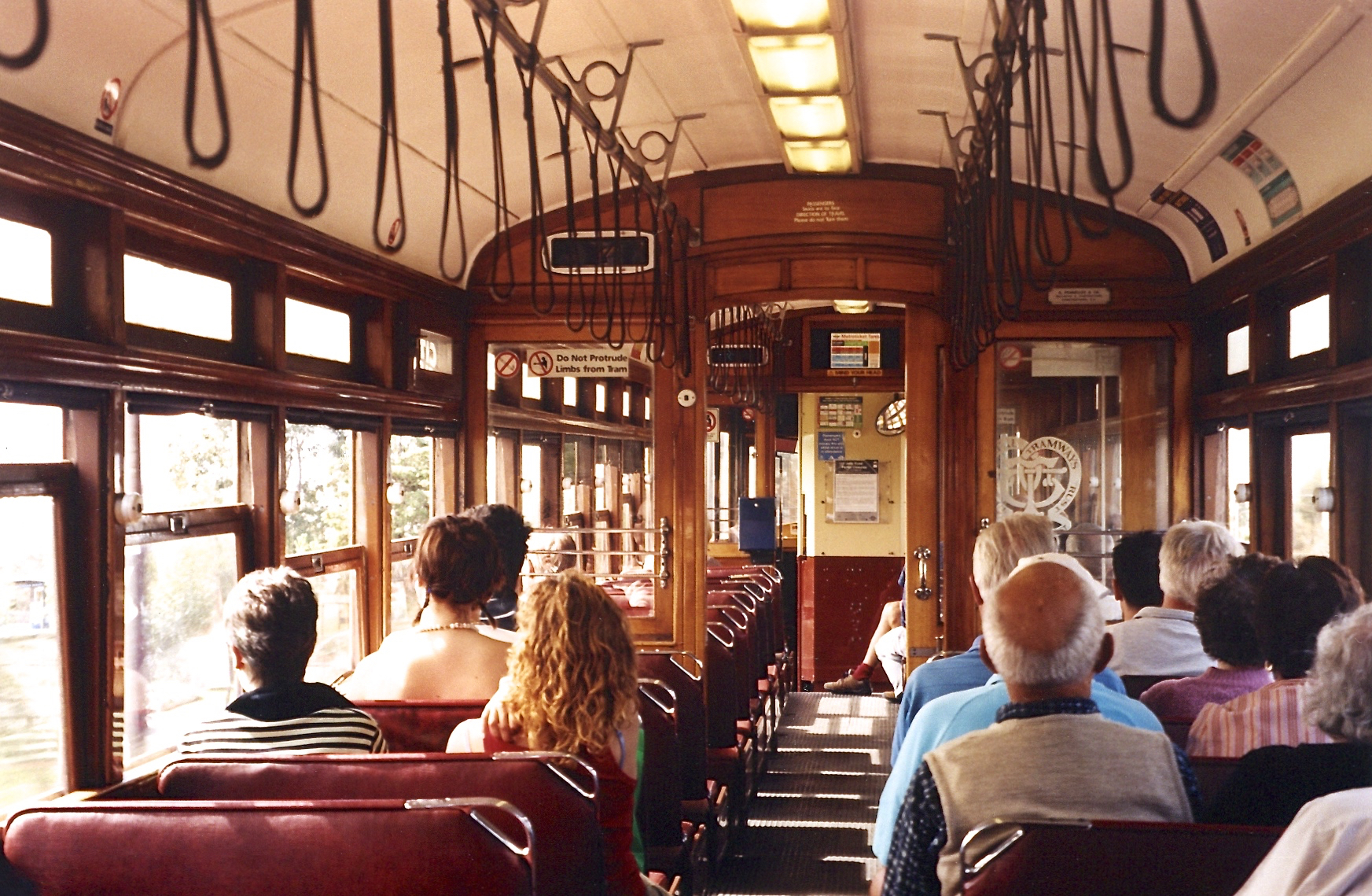
The interior of a Type H tram, 2005

To the travelling public the trams became known by their destination as "Glenelg" and "Bay" trams (after Holdfast Bay, on which Glenelg is located). They were very popular from the beginning; a journey on a "Bay" tram gave the traveller a comfortable experience of 1920s technology that with the passing of the years became more memorable. Brian Andrews recalled his childhood journeys in City and Glenelg:

Boarding the big red car ... my mother and I would settle into a comfortable leather seat in the non-smoking saloon as the "connie" (conductor) walked through the tram, throwing over pairs of reversible seats with both hands, with a "kalunkada kalunkada kalunkada". Then, with a sharp hiss of escaping air and a "klunk" the folding doors would close and the steps fold up against the side of the tram, and with a slight jerk we would be off. The journey would be punctuated by the sound of the push-button buzzers actuated by passengers wishing to alight at the next stop, the blare of the hooter as the tram approached level crossings and the occasional "dugga dugga dugga" sounding mysteriously from beneath the floor as the air compressor cut in to restore air pressure for the brakes and control system.

Construction

The car bodies were manufactured by A. Pengelley & Co. of the Adelaide suburb of Edwardstown – a company that had built trams for the street network since 1910 – for £5,000 each. (Note: Based on the Retail Price Index calculated by the Australian Bureau of Statistics, 5000 pounds in Australia in 1929 equates to 400,000 Australian dollars in 2018.) Steel undergear components and electrical equipment were sourced separately from the UK and US; the compensating-beam truck frames were supplied by the Australian agents of the Commonwealth Steel Company of Illinois and the rest of the truck was built by the MTT's Hackney workshops.

The body, 17.170 metres (56 feet 4.0 inches)s) long, had tapered ends and a width slightly less than other trams to allow them to clear corners in streets, such as when going into depots or on suburban street lines: although designed specifically for the Glenelg line, they also saw service on the street tramway routes to Henley North, Kensington Gardens and Cheltenham. Air-powered double doors and bottom steps permitted quick loading at each end. From the entry vestibule, a step up led to a saloon with reversible leather seats, with a mid-car, full-height partition, originally to separate smokers and non-smokers. Their capabilities included multiple-unit operation (up to three cars but limited to two after a major accident in 1937), automatic acceleration and remote electro-pneumatic control, interconnected by the electrical and compressed-air connections on automatic Tomlinson couplers. Four 45 kW (60 hp) motors were fitted, limited to confine the trams to a maximum speed of 72 km/h (45 mph). After a few years in service, the trams were also fitted with air horns.

A design shortcoming

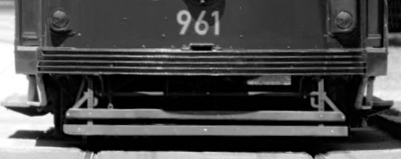
Deeply grooved anti-climb bumpers, which in a collision engage with their opposite number and lock with it, minimise the chance of another tram's steel frame scything through a wooden-bodied tram. Despite the high speeds of Type H trams on the reserved part of the Glenelg line, they did not have this feature.

North American streetcars and interurbans had evolved from all-wood construction early in the 20th century through composite wood-and-steel to heavyweight steel (about 1909) and to lightweight steel in the 1920s. All-steel construction reduced maintenance and potential loss of life inherent in a collision in which a steel underframe scythed through the wooden body of an opposing car. Although four years earlier the MTT had imported Birney safety cars from the J.G. Brill Company built of lightweight steel, and despite the higher-than-normal speed of the Type H trams, the MTT did not incorporate this inexpensive feature in its design. (Note: Brian Andrews (2014) posited three reasons for the decision: time was of the essence in getting a fully functional electric service going on the line, which did not allow the MTT to develop a design in (for them) an untried technology; experience of the chosen design existed in-house; and Pengelley, the successful tenderer for the Type F1 street tramcar bodies, was experienced in building wooden bodies for the Trust. Type H bodies could be made quickly by a trusted supplier, permitting timely supervision of the contract and where necessary the use of MTT staff.) Many Glenelg line collisions, particularly at level crossings, required substantial repairs, confirming their vulnerability.

Modifications and refurbishing

During the 1930s, five trams' trolley poles were replaced experimentally with pantographs, each of a different pattern. (Note: The trams were variously fitted with a Fischer bow collector and pantographs by Siemens-Schuckert, ASEA, Metropolitan-Vickers, and English Electric. During the experiments, the pantographs were only used on the private reserve section of the line, which at the time was fitted with a railway-like catenary overhead system rather than the traditional tramway-style overhead used on the rest of the system.) However, the overhead wires at the time, although suspended in a catenary system, were configured near the centreline of the tram rather than being "zig-zagged" (staggered from one side to the other), which is essential to ensure the wire can "wipe" back and forth along the pantograph to prevent grooves forming. All pantographs in the experiment wore unevenly, so further work was discontinued.

The whole fleet was re-motored in 1956 with slightly more powerful 48 kW (64 hp) motor originally intended for the unrealised H1 fleet. Replacement air horns were installed; gongs remained.

In 1986, when operations were transferred from the Angas Street (City) depot (Note: Angas Street depot location: 34.9299°S 138.6010°E) to the new Glengowrie depot (Note: Glengowrie depot location: 34.9783°S 138.5373°E) on the Glenelg line and the overhead wiring was re-engineered (including rigging the wire to "zig-zag"), 11 out of the 21 surviving cars were fitted with pantographs and all 21 had roller bearings fitted to their trucks. (Note: Five un-refurbished cars were disposed of.) Ten of the cars underwent their first-ever major refurbishment at the State Transport Authority's workshops, based at the time in Regency Park.

In 2001 and 2002, some Type H cars were modernised, asbestos was removed and electronic inverter controls replaced the original control gear. Five cars were given a complete rebuild. (Note: The modernised Type H trams were numbers 351, 367 (later re-numbered as 352), 370, 374 and 380.)

In 2005 all remaining cars were modified so they could operate past the upgraded passenger platforms built in readiness for new 100 Series Flexity Classic trams, which would be narrower.

Liveries

When introduced in 1929, the cars received a varnished tuscan-red and deep cream livery, with varnished wood interiors and black undergear, as for other Adelaide trams. Between 1952 and 1956 the livery of all Type H cars was changed to silver and carnation red and an Ashbury green interior. In 1959 and 1960, two cars were painted in a short-lived experimental grey and carnation red livery, and in 1971 two others received the same livery but with a "railway" red roof to overcome the problem of silver roofs soon appearing dirty; the idea was not adopted. (Note: Cars 379 and 380 in 1959–1960; 363 and 364 in 1971.) All silver trams were returned to their original external and internal livery starting in 1971, when 18 cars were extensively refurbished.

Some cars received liveries different from the two mentioned. In 1979 car 377 was repainted with a black-and-gold livery to celebrate the 50th anniversary of tramway operation on the Glenelg line, which it retained for a few years. Car 380 was also briefly repainted in 1979 into a special livery by students in the Glenelg area as part of a South Australian schools festival. Car 378 gained a grey-roofed, royal blue, gold-lined livery in 1990 when it became a restaurant car. (Note: The first iteration was called the "Adelaide Tram Car Restaurant", serving pre-cooked meals ranging from afternoon teas to three-course dinners. It ceased operation about three years later. Subsequently the government transport agency TransAdelaide brought the tram back as "Grand Lady" – a reference to the Grand Hotel at Glenelg, which pre-cooked its meals. The tram finally ceased its role in 2001. It is on display (running occasionally) at the Tramway Museum, St Kilda.)

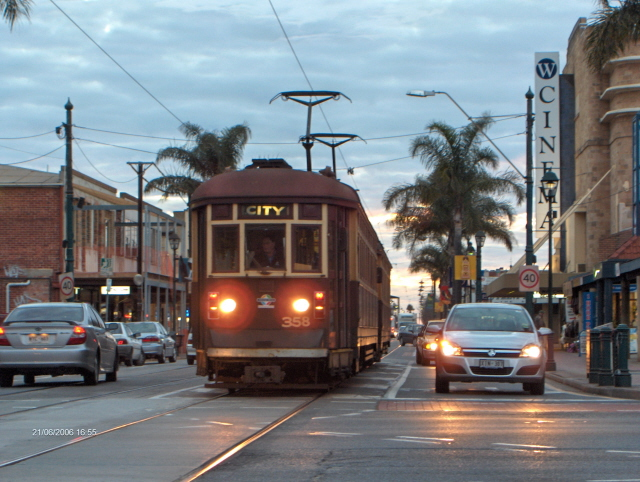
In January 2006, a month before their retirement from revenue service, Type H cars 358 and 357 about to cross Brighton Road, Glenelg, to enter the 9.25 km (5.75 mi) of reserved track ahead. They are now owned by the Sydney Tramway Museum.

Change to numerical classification

In 2006, when the first of the new trams purchased for Adelaide's tramways revival began operation, a numerical "series" classification replaced the old alphabetical system. From then until they ceased running in 2015, Type H trams were designated as the 300 Series, which conveniently accorded with their existing numbers.

Withdrawal

The first withdrawal from service of Type H cars occurred in the late 1950s; by 1968 the fleet consisted of 26 cars. (Note: The MTT's longstanding preference to keep Type H cars in consecutively numbered pairs for rostering purposes led to re-numbering as follows: 351 became 380 in 1959, 359 in 1960, and reverted to 351 in 1979; 353 became 377 in 1968; 354 became 366 in 1968; 361 became 363 in 1971; 363: became 361 in 1971; 367: became 352 in 2013.) In September 2005, tenders were called for the sale and removal of 16 cars: ten operational; (Note: Numbers were 357, 358, 361, 364, 365, 368, 369, 371, 372 and 373.) restaurant car 378; and five non-operational. (Note: Numbers were 363, 375, 376, 377 and 379.) Organisations such as museums with heritage experience could seek a tram as a gift or at minimum value. Their subsequent uses were as varied as a restaurant, an attraction at a bed-and-breakfast venue, a tourism display at Glenelg, and a media studies classroom in a Riverland high school.

In 2006, a transitional period started in which the cars were progressively withdrawn as new Flexity Classic trams arrived. Most were withdrawn by 2007; the final revenue service on the Glenelg Line was in 2008, by which time the cars were 79 years old. Five of them were retained at Glengowrie depot to operate a weekend "heritage tram" service and charter trips, the last of which occurred in 2015. (Note: The five retained trams were 351, 352 (previously numbered 367), 370, 374 and 380, which had all received a major rebuild in 2000. Of these, 351 and 352, which had received a further, high-quality, restoration in 2013, were retained for "heritage use" before space was needed in 2017 for new Citadis trams and they were trucked to DPTI storage at Walkley Heights. In 2021 the department donated and moved them to the Tramway Museum, St Kilda.) They were acquired by tramways museums, where as of 2019 most were operable.

=== Type H1 ===
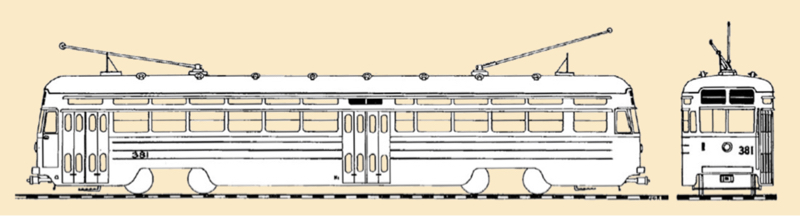

At a glance
In 1939, 18 years after the modernising Type F street tram was introduced and 10 years after the Type H "Glenelg" trams, the MTT planned to upgrade its fleet with 40 trams of a new design. However, the Second World War intervened, and post-war material shortages mandated that construction be delayed until the 1950s. The design – in effect a steel-bodied, streamlined version of the Type H – was tested by building a prototype that became Type H1 no. 381. It entered service in January 1953, just before a decision to abandon Adelaide's street tramways resulted in cancellation of the rest of the order. Now preserved in operating condition at the Tramway Museum, St Kilda, it remains one of a kind.

Next type acquired: 100 Series in 2006.

Type H1 details
Introduced	1952
No. built	1
Builder	J.A. Lawton & Sons Ltd
Crush load	184, of whom 52 were seated
Weight	26.0 tonnes (26.0 long tons, 29.0 short tons)
Height	3.400 m (11.15 ft) 1 7/8 ins)
Length	17.170 metres (56 feet 4.0 inches)s)
Width	8 ft 6 1/2 in (2.60 m)
Truck type	Commonwealth Steel
No. of motors	4
Power/motor	48 kW (64 hp)

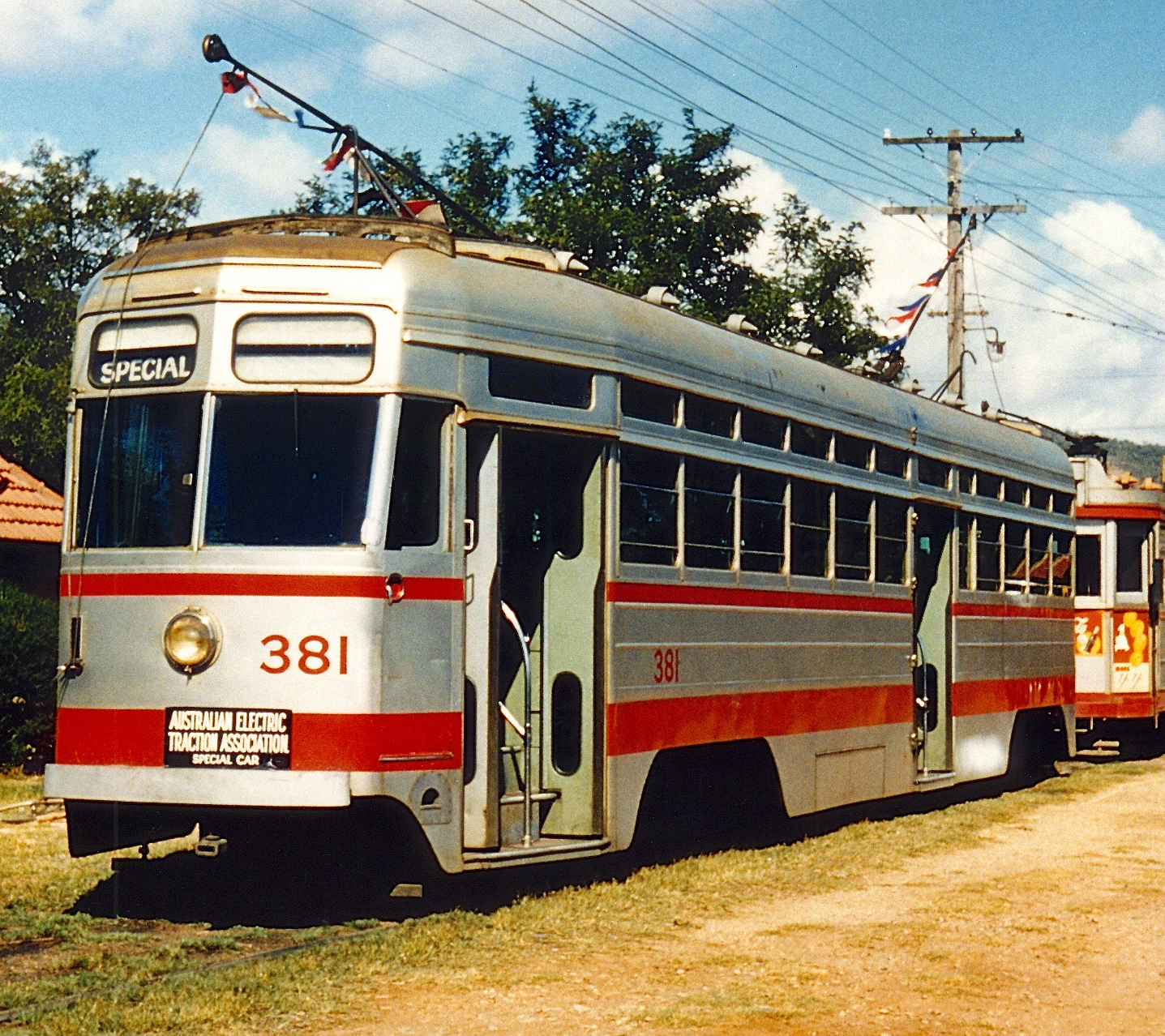
Prototype, and only, Type H1 tram no. 381, on an enthusiast tour of 1 April 1956, was an uncommon visitor at the terminus of the Colonel Light Gardens line.

When Adelaide's street tramways were closed in 1958, Type H1 car 381 was the most modern of the MTT fleet. It was the first of a projected order of 40 cars originally planned in 1939. However, the Second World War intervened, and post-war material shortages delayed construction until the 1950s. Built by Adelaide bus manufacturer J.A. Lawton & Sons as one of two prototypes, no. 381 was essentially a streamlined, all-steel version of the Type H with many constructional features of buses and one pair of doors in the middle of the tram instead of at the end. Although it captured the public's imagination, commonly being known as "the streamliner", it incorporated only marginal improvements over the Type H. It was introduced in January 1953 and for most of its short operational life it ran on the through-routed Kensington and Henley North lines.

In 1953, however, time was running out for Adelaide's trams. By February 1950 petrol rationing had ended and families aspired to buy motor cars; patronage on public transport had dropped from 95 million in 1946 to 78 million in 1951. In 1951 the lower house of the parliament of South Australia appointed a select committee (Note: The investigation is often wrongly cited as being undertaken by a royal commission. It was undertaken by a select committee, which has few of the powers of a royal commission. Select committees are "established by a House to inquire into a Bill or other particular matter and cease to exist after they have reported".) to investigate the MTT following a forecast that in June 1952, for the first time since its inception, the trust would be unable to meet its financial obligations without assistance. in February 1952 the committee issued its interim findings criticising many of the operations of the trust, including a failure to plan for the future. (Note: Immediately before the interim report's release the new general manager, James Neville Keynes, had been obliged to inform the trust's local government council stakeholders that by June 1952 the trust would be unable to meet its financial obligations. The councils viewed this with concern, since they were responsible for any deficits under the terms of the Municipal Tramways Trust Act. No payments had ever been required, but it was becoming obvious that they soon would be if the trust did not receive government assistance. The select committee's final report of June 1952 recommended that the state government should take over the trust, that no new tramways should be built, and that the operations of the trust should be examined by a transport expert. The Chicago firm of De Leuw, Cather and Company subsequently acted as consultants.) Eleven months later, in the same month that the H1 car was introduced, the MTT board, which since 1907 had comprised mainly municipal council appointees, was reconstituted with a new board of state government appointees. The board initiated a complete re-examination of the transport system, and plans were made to replace all the existing tramways, including the Glenelg line, with bus operation.

Thus tram 381 became one of a kind; a partly constructed 382 was scrapped. It was withdrawn from revenue service in December 1957 and donated to the Tramway Museum, St Kilda in 1965, where it is operational. It spent only five years in revenue service but has spent 61 years in preservation.

== Trams of the 21st century ==
=== 100 Series (Bombardier Flexity Classic) ===
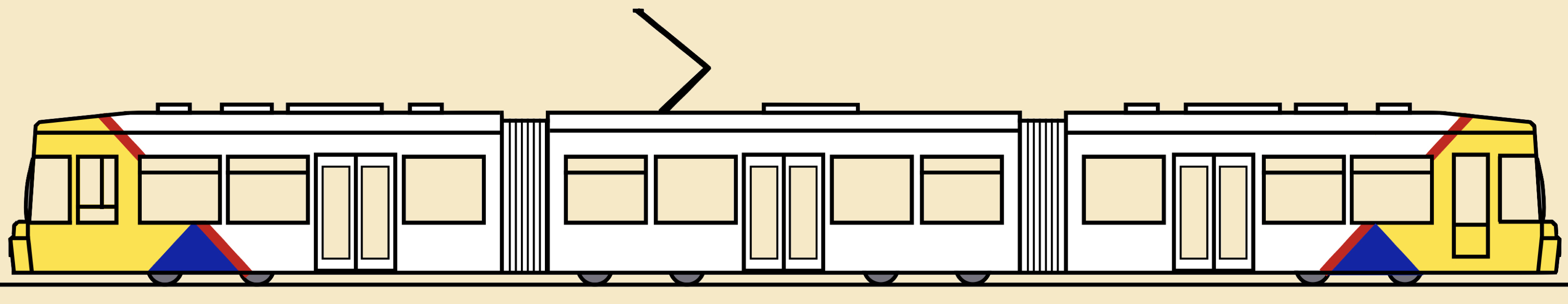

At a glance
The Bombardier Flexity Classic was the first tram type introduced to implement Adelaide's tramways revival in 2006. The model is one of a range of trams and light rail vehicles operating internationally, manufactured by Bombardier Transportation. The eleven introduced in 2006 as the 100 Series (and four introduced in 2008) are identical to those of Frankfurt's light rail network, since they were taken expediently from a production line of intended Frankfurt vehicles.

The trams have three segments, 70% low-floor capacity, seating for 64, and places for another 115 standing.

Next type acquired: 200 Series in 2009.

100 Series details
Introduced	2006, 2008
No. built	15
Builder	Bombardier Transportation, Bautzen
Crush load	91 standing, 64 seated
Weight	40 tonnes (39 long tons; 44 short tons)
Height	3.5 m (11 ft 6 in)
Length	30.04 m (98 ft 7 in)
Width	2.4 m (7 ft 10 in)
Truck type	Bombardier FLEXX Urban 2000, pivoted
No. of motors	4 × VEM DKCBZ 0211-4
Power/motor	105 kW (141 hp)
Axle arrangement	Bo′+2′2′+Bo′

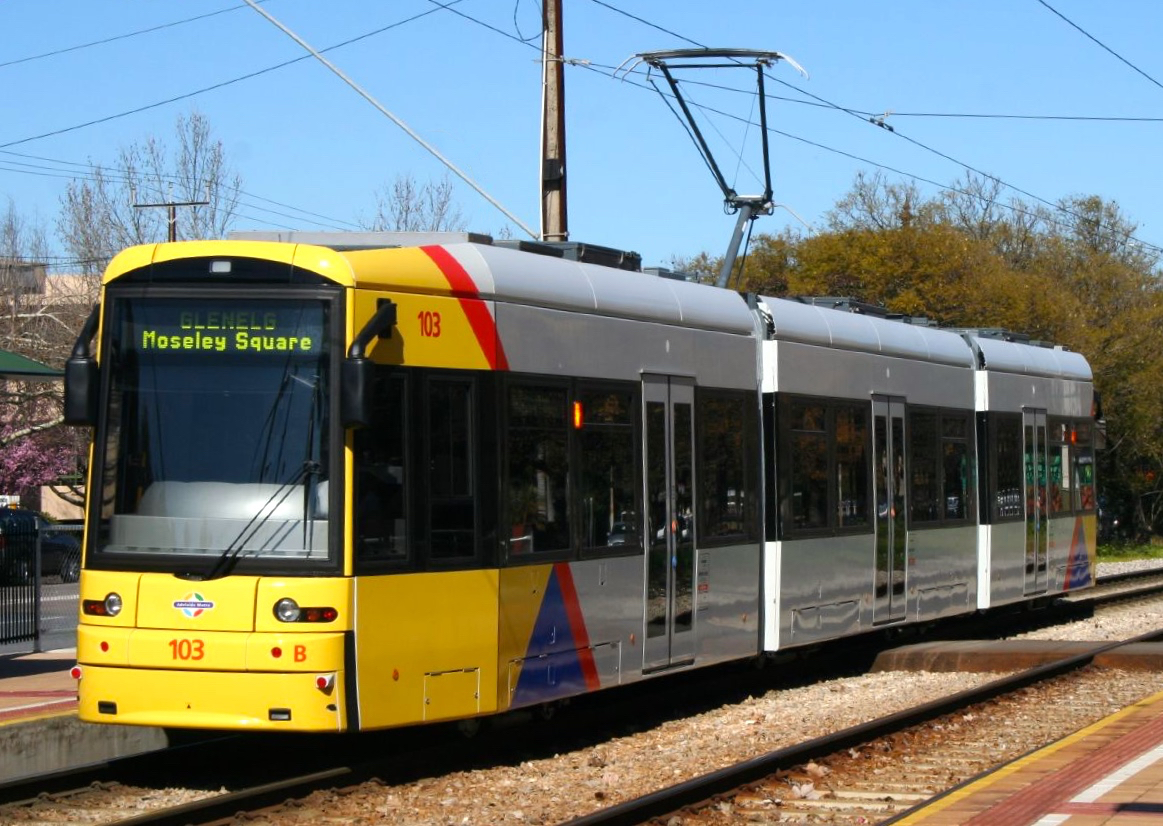
100 Series (Flexity Classic) tram on the 10.8 km (6.7 mi) sole-use reservation from Adelaide to Glenelg

Adelaide's tramway revival, which was first seen in the 2005 upgrading of the Glenelg tram line, continued with a $58 million investment in the first vehicles of a modern tram fleet. Starting in January 2006, eleven Bombardier Flexity Classic vehicles began operation, progressively replacing the Type H trams, by then 77 years old. Bombardier had won the supply tender against one other bidder, receiving an initial order for nine trams in September 2004. The company was able to effect unusually quick delivery from its factory in Bautzen, Germany, by supplying them on the back of a large order under way for VGF, the Frankfurt Transport Company.

The trams are 30.04 metres (98 feet 7 inches) long, articulated in three segments, with low floor height for 70 per cent of the vehicle.

A 360 degree interior view

An interactive 360-degree view of the interior of a Flexity Classic tram is
here

Several of the earlier Flexity cars were unloaded at Adelaide's Outer Harbor; later deliveries were first shipped to Melbourne and offloaded there before being hauled by road to Adelaide. (Note: One Flexity tram, no. 111, was deployed for several demonstration trips on the Melbourne tram network before delivery to Adelaide.)

Initially the trams' air conditioning systems, built for the Hamburg climate, failed to cope with Adelaide's high summer temperatures, but they were rectified by engineering changes in 2007.

Another two Flexity trams were ordered in time for the Victoria Square to City West route extension to Adelaide railway station that opened in October 2007. By 2008 the state government was reported to be considering the unusual step of lengthening the trams, instead of purchasing more, to accommodate increasing passenger numbers. However, an order was placed with Bombardier in September 2008 for an additional four trams for the route extension from North Terrace to the Adelaide Entertainment Centre.

With the introduction of the Flexity Classic, the Department of Planning, Transport and Infrastructure changed the MTT's alphabetical classification of tram types to a numeric system, and the Flexity Classics became the 100 Series. In informal parlance they are often referred to as "Flexities"; to the general public they are "yellow trams".

=== 200 Series (Alstom Citadis 302) ===
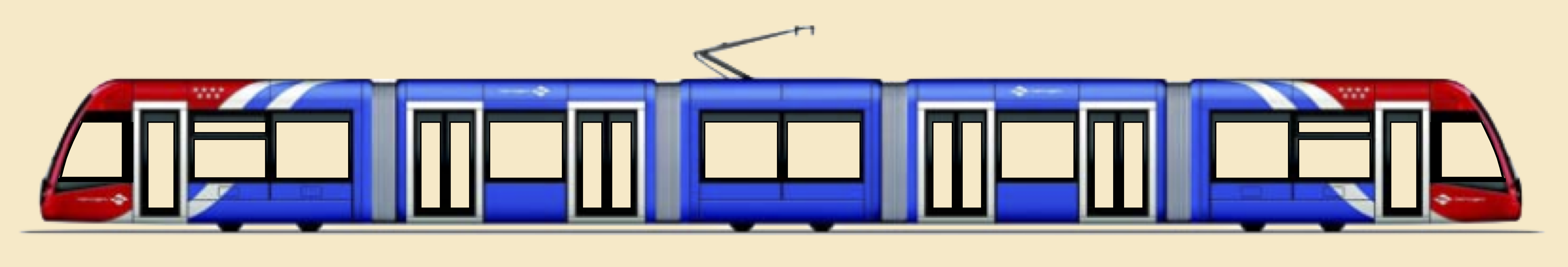

At a glance
The Citadis 302 model of tram operating in Adelaide is one of a large range of trams and light rail vehicles manufactured by Alstom. The six trams ordered as the 200 Series in 2009 and three in 2017 are identical to those of Madrid's Metro Ligero, from which they were purchased virtually new. They are very similar to others operated in 15 other cities around the world, including Melbourne.

The trams have five segments, 100% low-floor capacity, seating for 54, and places for another 132 standing.

This is the last series of tram so far built for the revived Adelaide tramways network.

200 Series details
Introduced	2009, 2017
No. built	9
Builder	Alstom, Barcelona
Crush load	132 standing, 54 seated
Weight	41 tonnes (40 long tons; 45 short tons)
Height	3.6 m (11 ft 9 3/4 in)
Length	32.3 m (106 ft 0 in)
Width	2.4 m (7 ft 10 in)
Truck type	Alstom Arpège, rigidly attached
No. of motors	4 × Alstom 4-HGA-1433
Power/motor	120 kW (160 hp)
Axle arrangement	Bo′+0′+2′+0′+Bo′

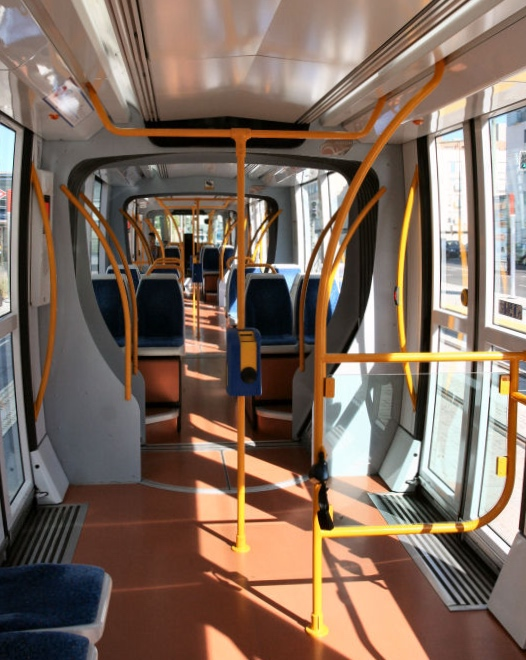
Citadis 302 interior.

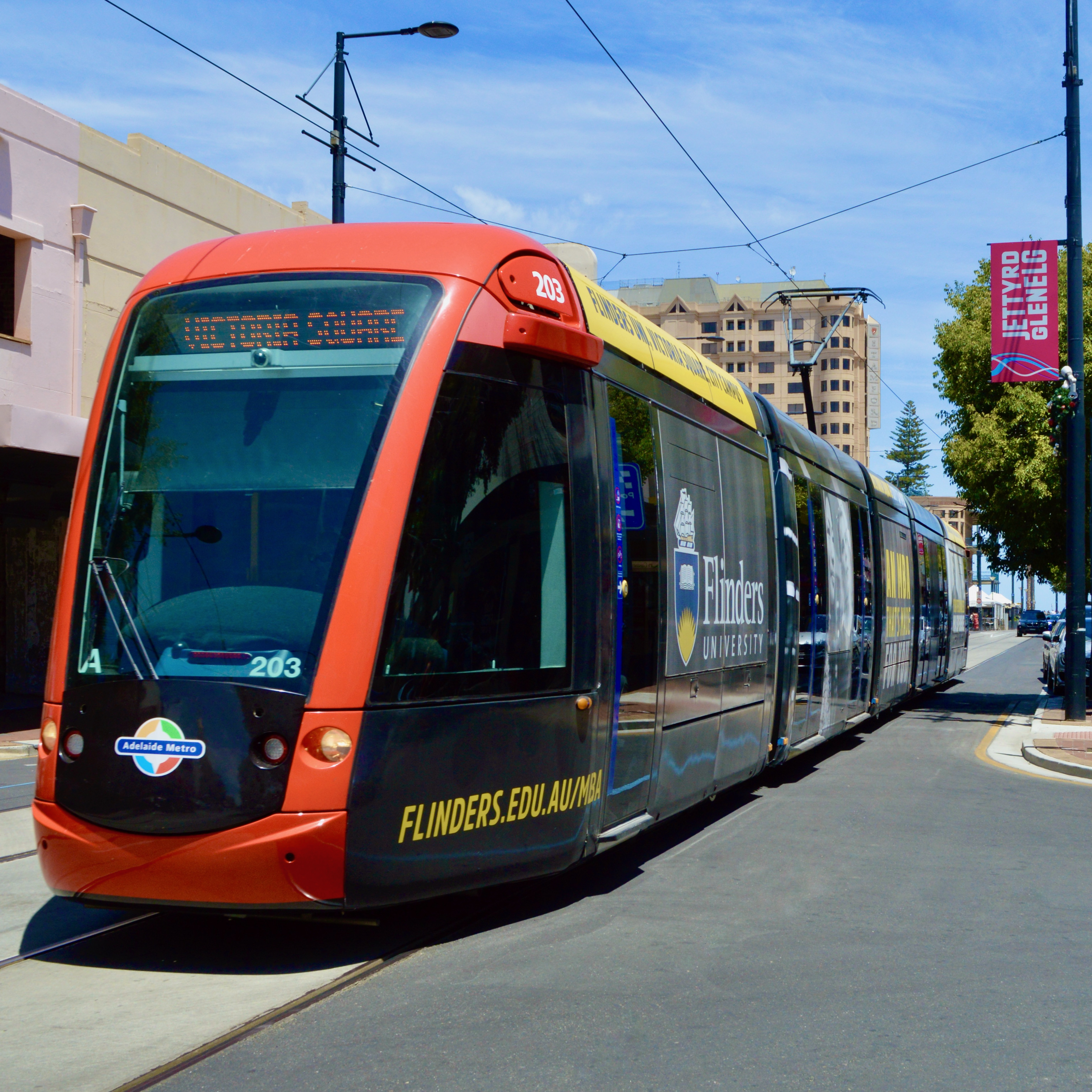
Alstom Citadis Model 302 tram in Jetty Road, Glenelg

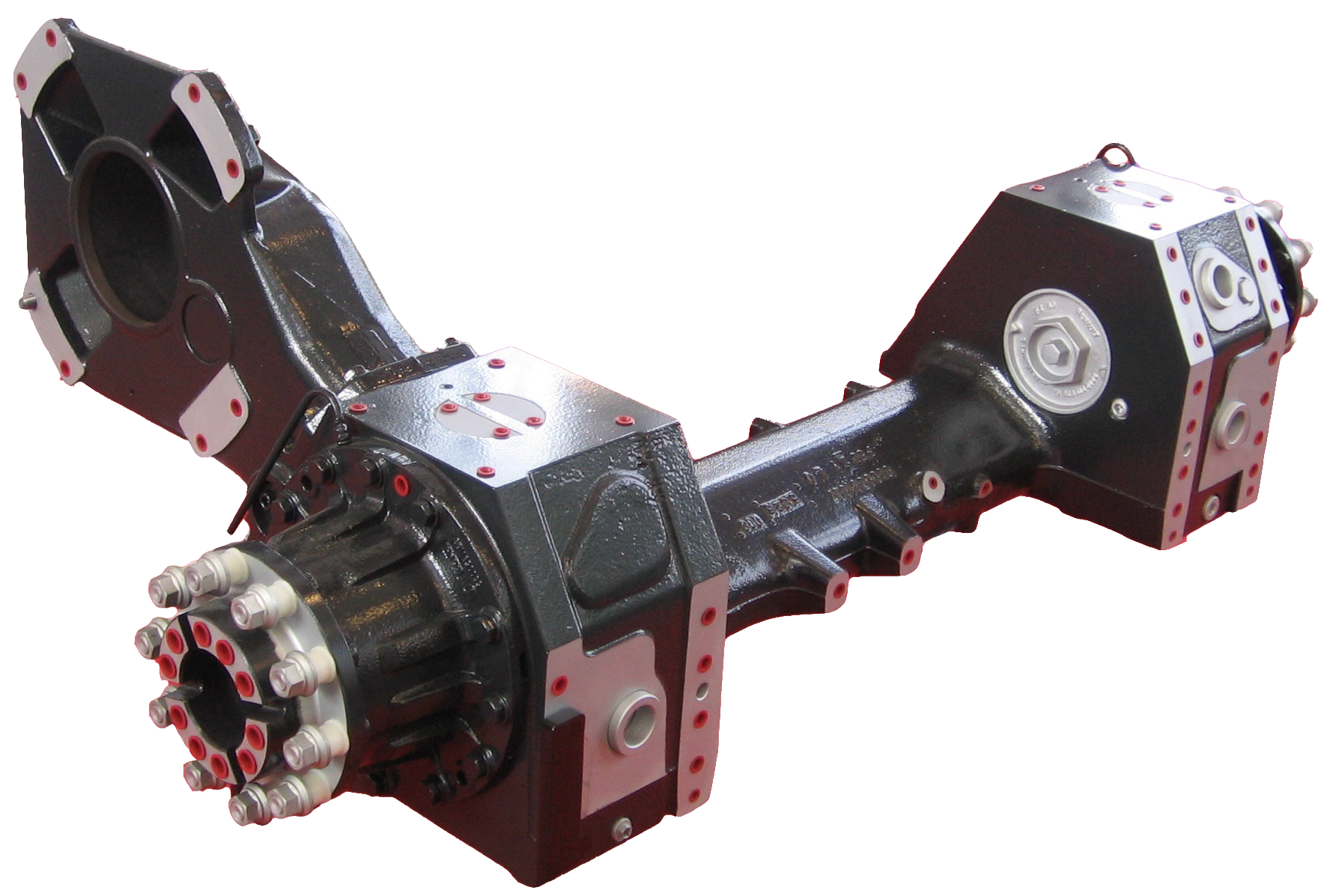
A driven axle unit on a Citadis 302 tram. Hub motors and the lack of an axle between the wheels allows 100% of the tram's floor to be low-level.

The Citadis 302 is one model in a range of low-floor trams and light rail vehicles built by Alstom. As of 2018, more than 2,500 Citadis trams have been sold to operators in more than 50 cities in 20 countries, conveying 4 million passengers per day. Alstom claims the Citadis's energy cost is one-quarter that of buses and one-tenth of cars. Most Citadis vehicles are made in Alstom's factories in La Rochelle, Reichshoffen and Valenciennes in France; in Barcelona, Spain (as in the case of Adelaide's 200 Series trams); and Annaba, Algeria.

Alstom built the first of what became Adelaide's 200 Series trams as part of an order of 70 Citadis model 302 units from Spanish operator Metro Ligero for service in Madrid. A scaling down of plans as a result of the 2008 financial crisis resulted in a number of them being placed into storage, "as new", immediately after delivery. TransAdelaide, needing to meet demand on the new line to the Adelaide Entertainment Centre, subsequently acquired six and shipped them to Australia.

Alstom ran one as a demonstrator for two weeks in Melbourne after landing; before delivery to Madrid the company had used one in Stockholm to test a route extension.

Before arriving in Adelaide the six trams were modified at the Preston Workshops heavy maintenance facility in Melbourne.

A further three trams arrived in December 2017 to meet expected demand from expansion of lines in eastern North Terrace and King William Road.

Compared to the 100 Series Flexity Classic trams, the 200 Series trams have a higher crush load (186 passengers compared with 115) but 10 fewer seats; low floors for 100 per cent of the passenger space; and are formed of five articulated sections rather than three. At 32.3 m (106 ft 0 in) they are (7 ft 6 1/2 ins) longer than the 100 Series. In informal parlance they are referred to as "Citadis" trams; the public use the term "red trams".

== Preserved Adelaide trams ==
Several museums, preservation groups and other entities have Adelaide trams that are accessible for rides or on static display. The Tramway Museum, St Kilda, 24 km (15 mi) north of the centre of Adelaide, has at least one example of every principal tram type to have been in service on a city street system. (Note: Technically, two types of trams are unrepresented in the museum's collection, but their omission is trivial. They are Type A1, of which 17 were built, and Type A2, of which only three were built. The design of both sub-types, when rebuilt from Type B trams, was generally similar to that of Type A.) Most of them are operational, running when rostered along 1.6 km (0.99 mi) of purpose-built track that runs between the museum and a large adventure playground.

For details of the preserved Adelaide trams as of 2022, click [show] in the following panel.

Preserved Adelaide trams
The following list was correct as of 2019. Additions since then are dated by their references. Some publicly accessible trams listed in museums are owned by entities other than the museum. Trams shown as "in storage" are generally inaccessible to the public. Privately owned trams not housed in a museum or other publicly accessible place are not included in the list.
Type	Number	Location	Notes
Horse	15, 18	Tramway Museum, St Kilda, South Australia	Car 18 is in fully restored running condition but is not operated. Car 15 is displayed (intentionally) in the deteriorated condition in which it was recovered.
A	1, 10	Tramway Museum, St Kilda	Operational, used on special occasions. Car 10 is restored as Ballarat Tramways 21.
"	14, 15	Tramway Museum, St Kilda	Operational as a coupled "Bib and Bub" set.
B	42	Tramway Museum, St Kilda	Operational, in regular service.
C	179	Portland Cable Trams, Portland, Victoria	Indoor static display.
"	186	Tramway Museum, St Kilda	Operational, in regular service.
D	156	Canberra Tradesmen's Union Club ("The Tradies"), Dickson ACT	Located indoors, used as a space for clientele to relax.
D	192	Tramway Museum, St Kilda	Formerly Melbourne & Metropolitan Tramways Board tram 130 (see Type D section of this article). Operational, in regular service.
E	118	Tramway Museum, St Kilda	Converted back from a Type E1. Operational, in regular service.
E1	111	Tramway Museum, St Kilda	Operational, in regular service.
F, F1	244, 264, 282	Tramway Museum, St Kilda	Type F1 numbers 264 and 282 are operational, in regular service. Type F 244 is in storage indoors.
G	303	Tramway Museum, St Kilda	Operational, in regular service.
"	301,302, 304	Bendigo Tramways, Victoria	302 is operational, in regular service. 301 and 304 are in storage (as nos 30 and 28).
H	351, 352	Tramway Museum, St Kilda	As of May 2023, 352 had re-entered service and 351 was being refurbished. (Note: After being replaced by 100 Series (Flexity Classic) trams on the Glenelg tram line in 2006, Type H trams 352 (renumbered from 367 in 2013) and classleader 351 were first retained at Glengowrie depot for occasional use, which ended in 2015. In 2017 they were moved to the Department for Infrastructure and Transport storage facility at Walkley Heights. In 2021 they were donated to the Tramway Museum, St Kilda, where work started for their re-entry into service, including conversion from pantograph to trolley pole operation. No. 352 entered operational service, in silver and carnation red livery, in May 2023.)
"	357	Sydney Tramway Museum, Loftus, NSW	Stored outdoors in Canberra. Not publicly accessible.
"	358	Sydney Tramway Museum	Operational, in regular service.
"	360, 362, 364, 365	Tramway Museum, St Kilda	360 and 365 are operational, in regular service. 362 and 364 are on static display indoors.
"	368	Tramway Museum Society of Victoria, Bylands, Victoria	Stored. Not publicly accessible.
"	369	Bendigo Tramways	Operational. About once a month, runs as the "Blues Tram", organised and staged by Bendigo Blues & Roots Music Festival.
"	371, 372	Perth Electric Tramway Society, Whiteman Park, Perth	Operational, in regular service.
"	373	Tramway Museum Society of Victoria, Bylands, Victoria	In operational condition; awaiting re-accreditation.
"	374	Old Tailem Town pioneer village, near Tailem Bend, SA	Outdoor static display.
"	378	Tramway Museum, St Kilda	Former restaurant tram. Indoor static display.
H1	381	Tramway Museum, St Kilda	Operational.

Links to articles about Adelaide tramways, from the horse tram era to the contemporary era of tramways revival, are accessible in the panel at the beginning of this article: click [show] to open it.
