= Noyes =

Noyes is a given name and surname. Notable people with the name include:

== Given name ==
- Noyes Barber (1781–1844), American politician
- Noyes Billings (1800–1865), American politician, 39th Lieutenant Governor of Connecticut
- Noyes L. Jackson (1860–1933), American politician, businessman and farmer
- Noyes Leech (1921–2010), American lawyer and law professor

== Surname ==
- Albertina Noyes (born 1949), American figure skater
- Alfred Noyes (1880–1958), English poet
- Alfred Noyes (cricketer) (1835-1902), Australian cricketer
- Arthur Amos Noyes (1866–1936), American chemist, inventor and educator
- Arthur Noyes (organist) (1862–1929), church organist in South Australia
- Arthur Percy Noyes (1880–1963), American psychiatric administrator and educator
- Arthur H. Noyes (1853–1915), U.S. federal judge
- Beppie Noyes (1919–2007), American author and illustrator
- Bertha Noyes (1876–1966), American artist
- Blanche Noyes (1900–1981), American pioneering female aviator
- Clara Noyes (1869–1936), American nurse and Director of the Red Cross Nursing Service during World War I
- Crosby Stuart Noyes (1825–1908), American newspaper publisher
- David K. Noyes (1820–1900), Wisconsin politician and Union Army officer
- Dorothy Noyes (born 1960), American folklorist and ethnologist
- Edward Noyes (c. 1858–1920), co-founder of Australian engineering company Noyes Brothers
- Edward Follansbee Noyes (1832–1890), Republican politician from Ohio
- Edwin Noyes, American politician
- Eliot Noyes (1910–1977), American architect and designer
- Florence Fleming Noyes (1871–1928), American classical dancer
- Frances Noyes Hart (1890–1943), American writer
- Frederick Bogue Noyes (1872–1961), American dentist
- Fred W. Noyes Jr. (1905–1987), American artist and entrepreneur, founder of the Noyes Museum of Art
- George Lorenzo Noyes (1863–1945), American artist and mineralogist
- Harriet Hayes Noyes (1817–1893), American writer and editor
- Haskell Noyes (1886–1948), American conservationist
- Henry Noyes (c. 1860–1922), co-founder of Australian engineering company Noyes Brothers
- Henry Halsey Noyes (1910–2005), American writer
- Henry Sanborn Noyes (1822–1870), president of Northwestern University
- James Noyes (1608–1656), English clergyman
- Jansen Noyes, Jr. (1918–2004), American investment banker
- John Noyes (politician) (1764–1841), Vermont politician
- John Noyes (entomologist) (born 1949), Welsh entomologist
- John Humphrey Noyes (1811–1886), founder of the Oneida Community in the US
- Joseph C. Noyes (1798–1868), United States Representative from Maine
- Kenny Noyes (born 1979), American motorcycle road racer
- Maty Noyes (born 1997), American singer-songwriter
- Newbold Noyes, Jr. (1918–1997), American publisher
- Nicholas Noyes, colonial minister during the time of the Salem witch trials of 1692
- Paul Noyes (1870–1946), American football coach
- Peter Noyes (academic administrator), British academic, former Vice-Chancellor of University of Wales, Newport
- Peter Noyes (journalist), American newscaster and journalist
- Peter Noyes, English MP for Andover in 1614
- Samuel Noyes (1754–1845), co-founder of the Noyes Academy
- Walter Chadwick Noyes (1865–1926), American judge
- William Noyes (disambiguation), several people
- Win Noyes (1889–1969), American baseball pitcher

== See also ==
- General Noyes (disambiguation)
- Kenneth Noye, British criminal
- Noyce, a variant of the surname
