= Noyes (disambiguation) =

Noyes is a name.

Noyes may also refer to:

== Places ==
=== United States ===
- Noyes, Minnesota, a town
- Noyes Township, Pennsylvania
- Noyes Island, Alexander Archipelago, Alaska
- Noyes Mountain (Maine)
- Mount Noyes (Washington)
- Noyes Mountain, a summit of the Mentasta Mountains in Alaska

=== Canada ===
- Mount Noyes, Alberta

== Other uses ==
- Noyes Academy, an abolitionist school in Canaan, New Hampshire, United States
- Noyes Building, the administration building of Snow College, Ephraim, Utah, United States, on the National Register of Historic Places
- Noyes Cottage, Harrietstown, New York, United States, on the National Register of Historic Places
- Noyes Museum, an art museum in New Jersey, United States
- Noyes Records, a Canadian record label
- Noyes station, a rapid transit station in Chicago, Illinois, United States
- Noyes Laboratory of Chemistry, University of Illinois Urbana-Champaign

== See also ==
- Noyes House (disambiguation)
- Noye (disambiguation)
