= Henry Noyes =

Henry Noyes may refer to:

- Henry Noyes, co-founder of Australian engineering company Noyes Brothers
- Henry Sanborn Noyes (1822–1870), president of Northwestern University
- Henry Halsey Noyes (1910–2005), American writer, publisher, teacher, and distributor of Chinese books and magazines
- Henry E. Noyes (1839–1919), United States Army officer
- Henry D. Noyes (1832–1900), American optometrist and surgeon

== See also ==
- Noyes (disambiguation)
