= Silverhorn Mountain =

Mountain in Banff NP, Alberta, Canada

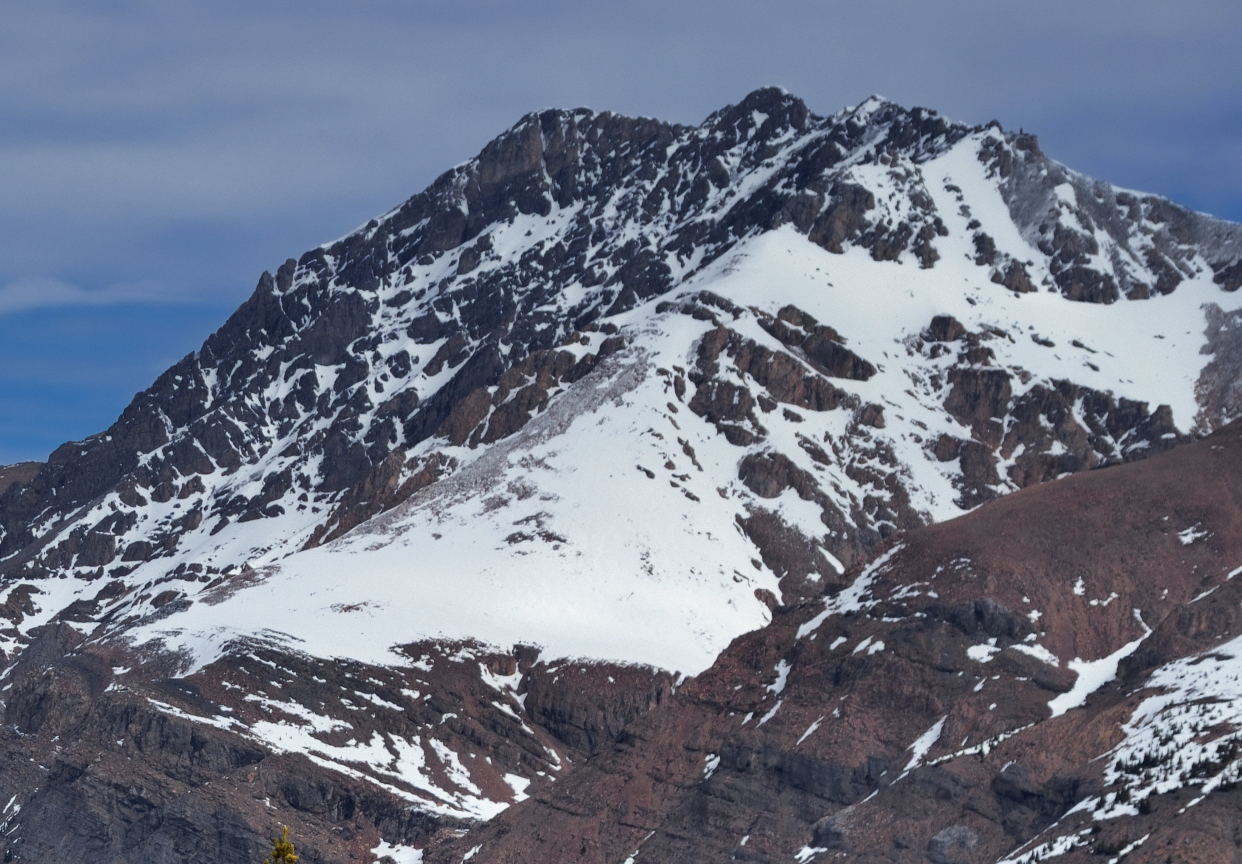
- Silverhorn Mountain, south aspect

Highest point
- Elevation: 2,911 m (9,551 ft)
- Prominence: 168 m (551 ft)
- Parent peak: Observation Peak (3174 m)
- Listing: Mountains of Alberta
- Coordinates: 51°45′45″N 116°29′56″W

Geography
- Location within Alberta Location within Canada
- Location: Banff National Park; Alberta, Canada
- Parent range: Murchison Group; Canadian Rockies
- Topo map: NTS 82N16 Siffleur River

Geology
- Rock age: Cambrian
- Rock type: Sedimentary

Climbing
- Easiest route: Scrambling

Silverhorn Mountain is a 2,911-metre (9,551-foot) mountain summit located in the Mistaya River valley of Banff National Park, in the Canadian Rockies of Alberta, Canada. Silverhorn Mountain is situated 3.9 kilometres southeast of Mount Weed, and 3.1 km northwest of Observation Peak. Silverhorn stands directly east across the Mistaya River valley from Mount Patterson, and both are prominent features seen from the Icefields Parkway.

== History ==
The mountain was given its descriptive name in 1899 by Rev. Charles Lathrop Noyes (1851-1923), a member of the Appalachian Mountain Club who climbed in the Rockies and made several first ascents, such as Mount Balfour, Mount Gordon, and Mount Lefroy. The mountain's name was officially adopted in 1924 by the Geographical Names Board of Canada.

== Geology ==
Like other mountains in Banff Park, Silverhorn is composed of sedimentary rock laid down during the Precambrian to Jurassic periods. Formed in shallow seas, this sedimentary rock was pushed east and over the top of younger rock during the Laramide orogeny.

== Climate ==
Based on the Köppen climate classification, Silverhorn Mountain is located in a subarctic climate with cold, snowy winters, and mild summers. Temperatures can drop below -20 °C with wind chill factors below -30 °C. Precipitation runoff from Silverhorn Mountain drains west into the Mistaya River, or east into Dolomite Creek which is a tributary of the Siffleur River.

== See also ==
- List of mountains of Canada
- Geography of Alberta
- Geology of the Rocky Mountains
