= Mount Rhondda =

Mountain on Alberta/British Columbia border in Canada

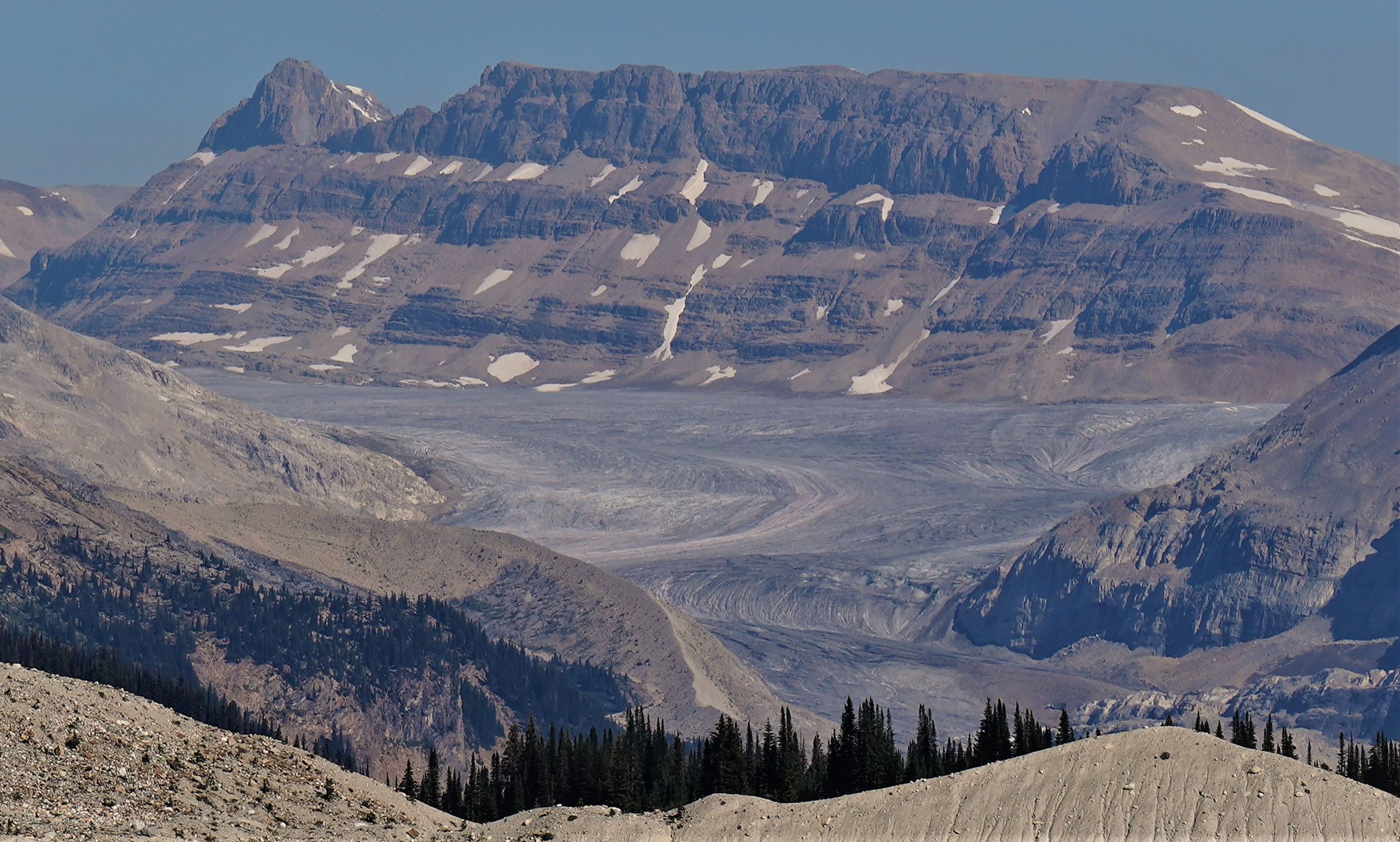
- Mount Rhondda seen with Yoho Glacier from Iceline Trail

Highest point
- Elevation: 3,062 m (10,046 ft)
- Prominence: 102 m (335 ft)
- Parent peak: Mount Habel (3087 m)
- Listing: Mountains of Alberta; Mountains of British Columbia
- Coordinates: 51°38′36″N 116°33′40″W

Geography
- Location within Alberta Location within British Columbia Location within Canada
- Country: Canada
- Provinces: Alberta; British Columbia
- Parent range: Waputik Mountains
- Topo map: NTS 82N10 Blaeberry River

Climbing
- First ascent: 1923 A. Geoffrion, J.W.A. Hickson, Edward Feuz Jr.

Mount Rhondda is located on the Continental Divide straddling the Canadian provinces of Alberta and British Columbia. It was named in 1917 by the Interprovincial Boundary Survey after David Alfred Thomas, First Viscount Baron Rhondda.

== First Ascent ==
Mt. Rhondda was first climbed in August 1923 by A. Geoffrion, J.W.A. Hickson and Edward Feuz Jr. The party's original intent was the FA of Mount Baker but early on in the ascent they discovered tracks from a different party (Walter Wilcox and Rudolf Aemmer) heading towards Mt. Baker. They decided to continue onto the col between the two peaks where they spotted snow tracks and cairn on the summit rocks of Mt. Baker. With Baker claimed, they turned their attention to Mt. Rhondda which they summited in the early afternoon after ascending mixed terrain of rock and snow.

== Geology ==
Mount Rhondda is composed of sedimentary rock laid down during the Precambrian to Jurassic periods. Formed in shallow seas, this sedimentary rock was pushed east and over the top of younger rock during the Laramide orogeny.

== Climate ==
Based on the Köppen climate classification, Mount Rhondda is located in a subarctic climate with cold, snowy winters, and mild summers. Temperatures can drop below −20 °C (−4 °F) with wind chill factors below −30 °C (−22 °F).

== See also ==
- List of peaks on the Alberta–British Columbia border
