= Mount Baker (Waputik Mountains) =

Mountain in Alberta/British Columbia, Canada

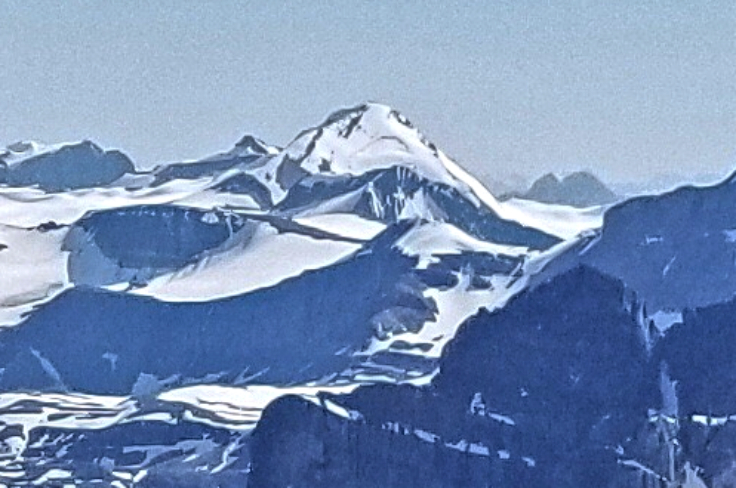
- Distant view of Mt. Baker from Mount Weed

Highest point
- Elevation: 3,180 m (10,430 ft)
- Prominence: 490 m (1,610 ft)
- Parent peak: Mount Patterson (3,197 m)
- Listing: Mountains of Alberta; Mountains of British Columbia
- Coordinates: 51°39′55″N 116°35′52″W

Geography
- Location within Alberta Location within British Columbia Location within Canada
- Country: Canada
- Provinces: Alberta and British Columbia
- Parent range: Waputik Mountains
- Topo map: NTS 82N10 Blaeberry River

Climbing
- First ascent: 1923 W.D. Wilcox, Rudolph Aemmer

Mount Baker is a mountain on the Continental Divide, in Alberta and British Columbia, in the Waputik Mountains of the Canadian Rockies. It was named in 1898 by J. Norman Collie after his friend and climbing partner George Percival Baker (1856–1951), textile manufacturer, plantsman and gardener, and keen mountaineer. Baker described his visit to this area which took place in 1897. In this small volume Baker noted that Collie also proposed to name a pass after him. Collie and Baker were accompanied by Peter Sarbach, and for the first week by H. B. Dixon as well as American members of the Appalachian Mountain Club. Mount Sarbach was named at the same time, as well as several other peaks: "We now named the peaks, after presidents of the Club of our time, Freshfield, Dent, Pilkington, and Walker."

The mountain has been wrongly identified as "Stremotch Mountain" on subsequent maps and documents after a first map that was submitted by C.S. Thompson to the Surveyor General and subsequently printed in "Map of the Wapta Icefield" in Canadian Alpine Journal Vol 1, No 1, 1907, p.151.

== Nearby ==
- Mount Patterson : 3,197 m (10,489 ft) : North (line parent)
- Trapper Peak : 2,988 m (9,803 ft) : North North East
- Mount Habel : 3,087 m (10,128 ft) : South East

== Gallery ==
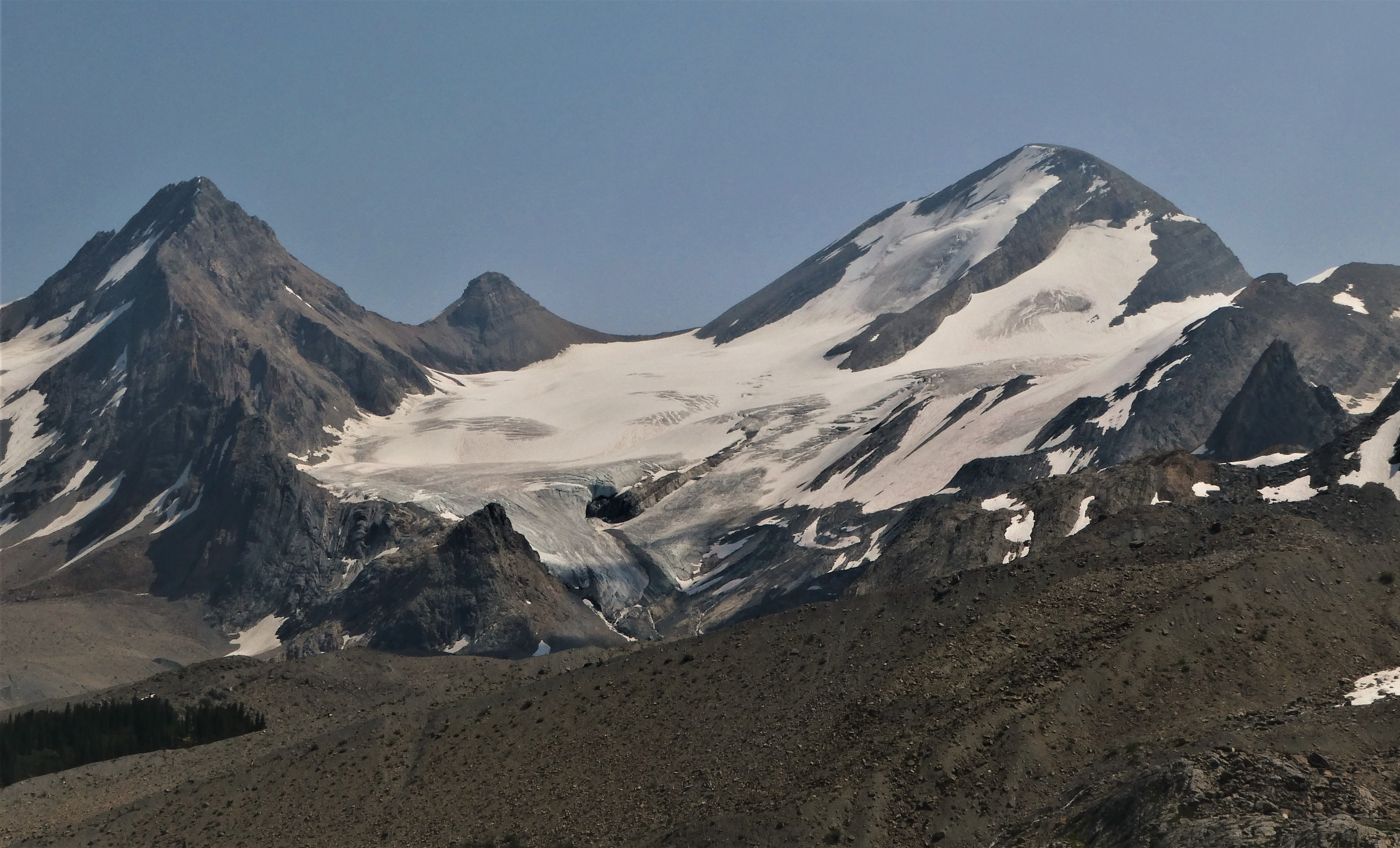
Trapper Peak (left), Baker Glacier, Mt. Baker (right) from northwest

== See also ==
- List of peaks on the Alberta–British Columbia border
