= Trapper Peak (Canada) =

Mountain in Alberta and British Columbia, Canada

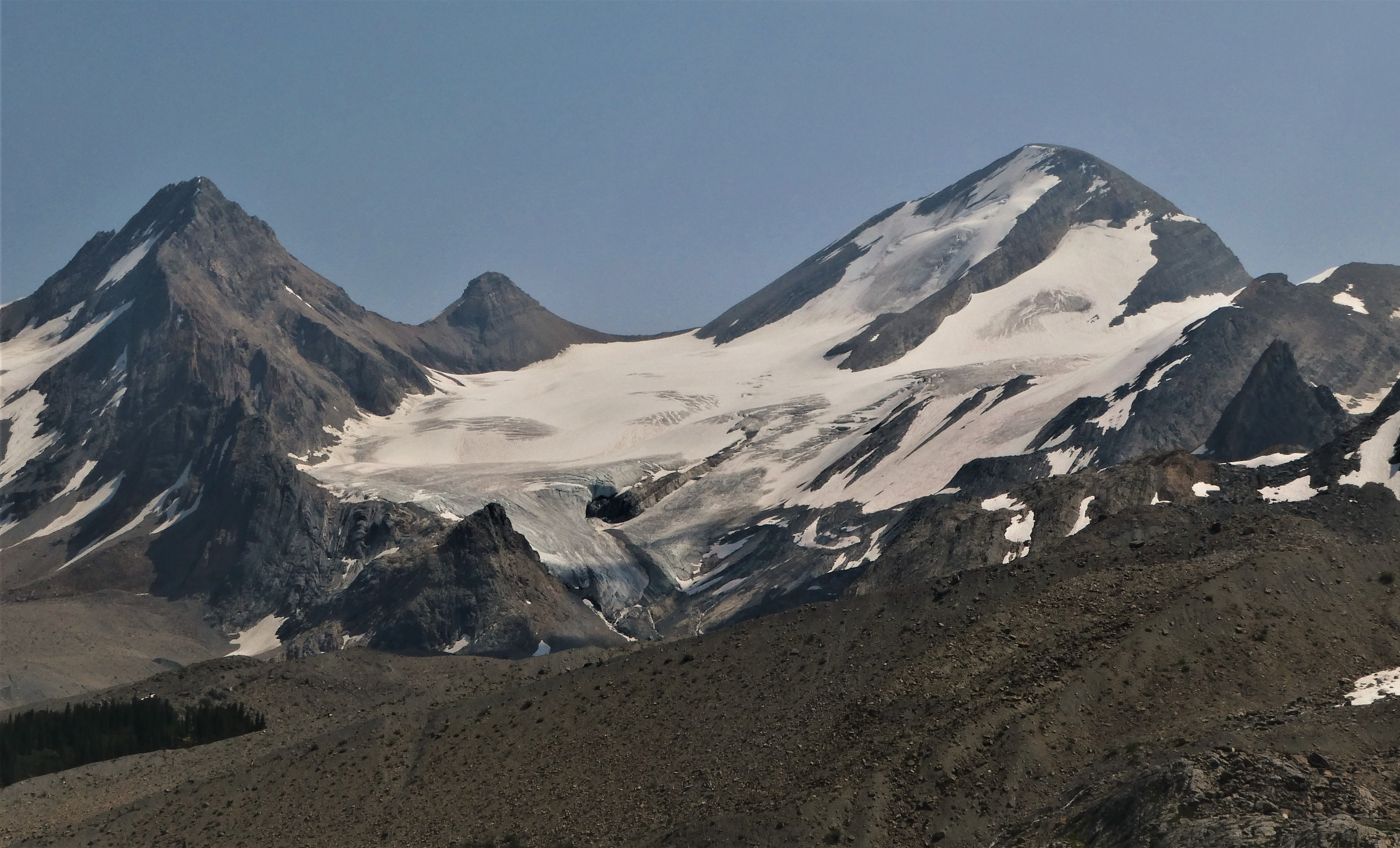
- Trapper Peak (left), Baker Glacier, and Mt. Baker (right) viewed from northwest

Highest point
- Elevation: 2,988 m (9,803 ft)
- Prominence: 128 m (420 ft)
- Listing: Mountains of Alberta; Mountains of British Columbia
- Coordinates: 51°40′38″N 116°35′27″W

Geography
- Location within Alberta Location within British Columbia Location within Canada
- Country: Canada
- Provinces: Alberta and British Columbia
- Parent range: Waputik Mountains
- Topo map: NTS 82N10 Blaeberry River

Climbing
- First ascent: July 21, 1933 by H.S. Kingman, J.M. Thorington, C. Kain

Trapper Peak is a mountain in Alberta and British Columbia, Canada, located on their border along the Continental Divide in the Wapta Icefield.

Trapper Peak has two summits, one accessible from Baker. Peyto Peak is located 2 km (1 mi) to the north-east.

The peak was originally named in 1892 by Walter D. Wilcox to honor his guide, trapper Bill Peyto, and the first ascent was in 1933 by Conrad Kain and party.

== Geology ==
Trapper Peak is composed of sedimentary rock laid down during the Precambrian to Jurassic periods. Formed in shallow seas, this sedimentary rock was pushed east and over the top of younger rock during the Laramide orogeny.

== Climate ==
Based on the Köppen climate classification, Trapper Peak is located in a subarctic climate zone with cold, snowy winters, and mild summers. Temperatures can drop below −20 °C (−4 °F) with wind chill factors below −30 °C (−22 °F).

== See also ==
- List of peaks on the Alberta–British Columbia border
