= Silverhorn =

Silverhorn may refer to:

- The Silverhorn, a route to the summit of Mount Athabasca
- the former name (1973-90) of Silver Mountain, ski resort in Kellogg, Idaho.
- Silverhorn: The Hilda Conkling Book for Other Children, a collection of poetry published in 1924.
- Silverhorn Ramsey, a character from the 1944 novel Canal Town by Samuel Hopkins Adams.
- Silver Horn, a character from the Mega Man X video game series
- Silver Horn, alias for Kiowa artist Haungooah (Silverhorn)
- Silverhorn, a kind of caddisfly mimicked as a fishing lure
- Silverhorn Mountain, in Banff National Park
