= Noyes Mountain =

Noyes Mountain may refer to the following American mountains:

- Noyes Mountain (Maine)
- Noyes Mountain, a summit of the Mentasta Mountains in Alaska

== See also ==
- Mount Noyes, Alberta, Canada
- Mount Noyes (Washington), United States
