= Noyes House =

Noyes House may refer to:

in the United States (by state then city or town)

- Noyes Mansion, Napa, California, listed on the NRHP in Napa County, California
- William Noyes Farmstead, Ledyard, Connecticut, listed on the NRHP in New London County, Connecticut
- Noyes House (New Canaan, Connecticut), listed on the NRHP in Fairfield County
- J.A. Noyes House, Cambridge, Massachusetts, listed on the NRHP
- James Noyes House, Newbury, Massachusetts, listed on the NRHP
- Noyes-Parris House, Wayland, Massachusetts, listed on the NRHP
- Jonathon L. and Elizabeth H. Wadsworth Noyes House, Faribault, Minnesota, listed on the NRHP in Rice County, Minnesota
- Noyes Hall, State School for the Deaf, Faribault, Minnesota, listed on the NRHP in Rice County
- Charles P. Noyes Cottage, White Bear Lake, Minnesota, listed on the NRHP
- Noyes Cottage, Saranac Lake, New York, listed on the NRHP
- John Noyes House, Starkey, New York, listed on the NRHP
- Larsen-Noyes House Ephraim, Utah, listed on the NRHP in Sanpete County, Utah
- Young-Noyes House, Charleston, West Virginia, listed on the NRHP

== See also ==
- Jacob Noyes Block, Suncook, New Hampshire, listed on the NRHP in Merrimack County, New Hampshire
