= Peyto Peak =

Mountain in Banff NP, Canada

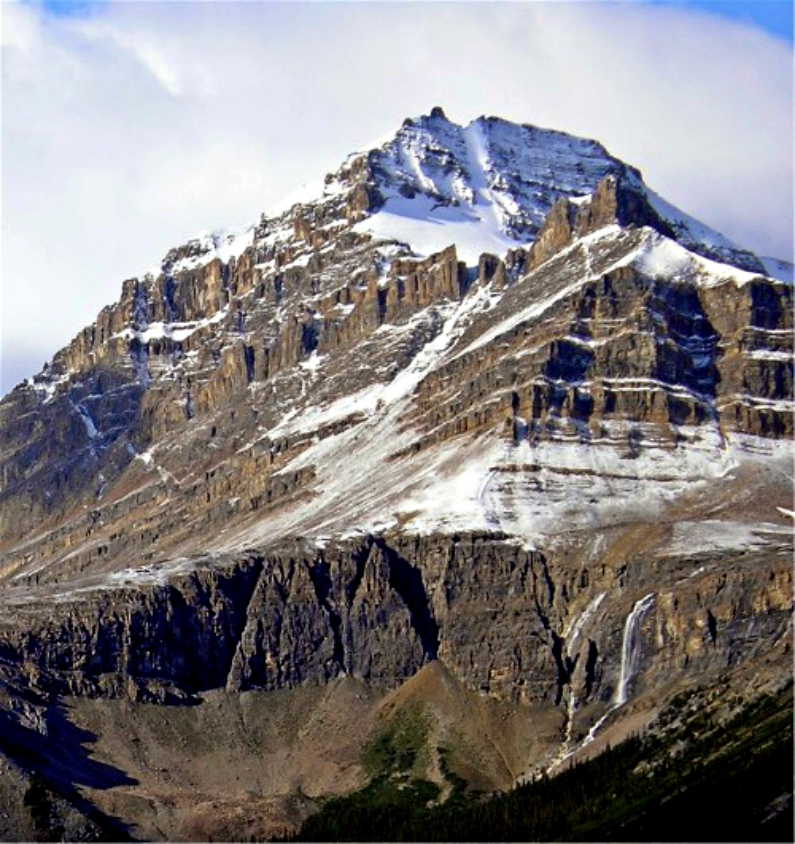
- Peyto Peak seen from Peyto Lake overlook

Highest point
- Elevation: 2,980 m (9,780 ft)
- Prominence: 220 m (720 ft)
- Parent peak: Mount Baker
- Listing: Mountains of Alberta
- Coordinates: 51°41′03″N 116°33′56″W

Geography
- Location within Alberta
- Location: Alberta, Canada
- Parent range: Waputik Range
- Topo map: NTS 82N10 Blaeberry River

Climbing
- First ascent: 1933 by Conrad Kain and party

Peyto Peak is a mountain in the Waputik Range, part of the Canadian Rockies in Alberta, Canada. It lies at the north end of the Wapta Icefield, in Banff National Park, about one km (0.6 mi) east of the border with British Columbia and 32 km (20 mi) north of the town of Field. Five kilometres to the northeast lies Bow Pass, one of the high points of the Icefields Parkway. Between the peak and the pass lies picturesque Peyto Lake. Three kilometres southwest of Peyto Peak is Mount Baker, the highest point in the immediate vicinity.

== History ==
Peyto Peak was named in 1896 by Walter Wilcox for Ebenezer William "Bill" Peyto, an early outfitter, trail guide and trapper in the Banff and Lake Louise areas. The first ascent of the peak was in 1933 by famed mountaineer Conrad Kain and party. The mountain's name was officially recognised in 1928 by the Geographical Names Board of Canada.

== Geology ==
Like other mountains in Banff Park, Peyto Peak is composed of sedimentary rock laid down during the Precambrian to Jurassic periods. Formed in shallow seas, this sedimentary rock was pushed east and over the top of younger rock during the Laramide orogeny.

== Climate ==
Based on the Köppen climate classification, Peyto Peak is located in a subarctic climate with cold, snowy winters, and mild summers. Temperatures can drop below -20 °C with wind chill factors below -30 °C. Precipitation runoff from Peyto Peak drains into the Mistaya River which is a tributary of the Saskatchewan River.

== See also ==
- List of mountains of Canada
