= Noyes-Parris House =

Historic house in Massachusetts, United States

- U.S. National Register of Historic Places
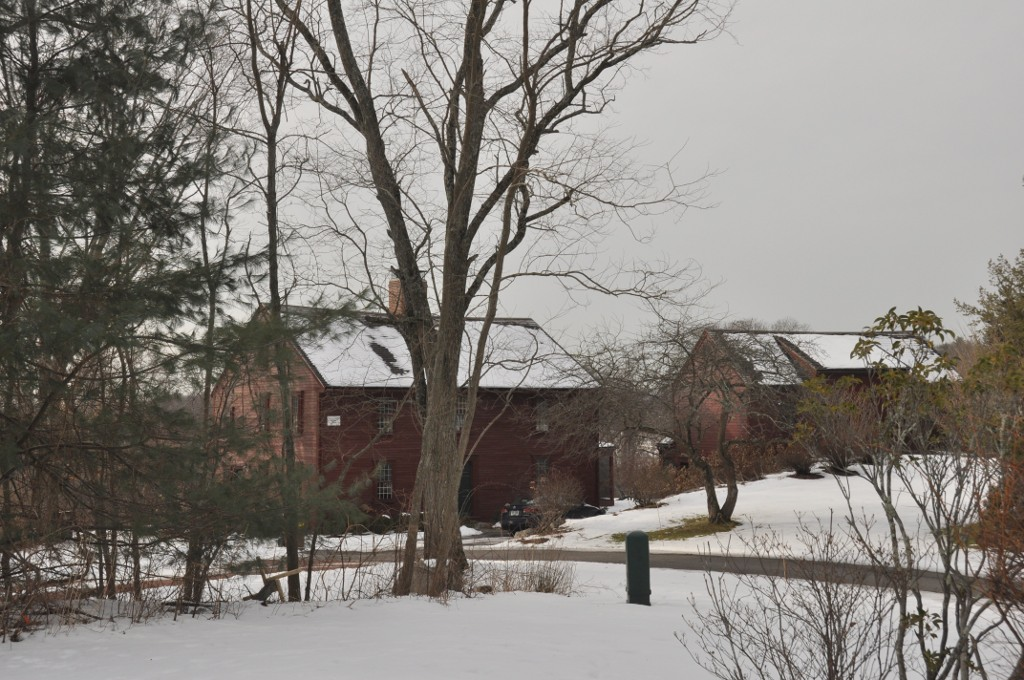

- Location within Massachusetts Location within the United States
- Location: 196 Old Connecticut Path, Wayland, Massachusetts
- Coordinates: 42°20′56″N 71°21′43″W
- Built: 1669
- Architectural style: Colonial
- MPS: First Period Buildings of Eastern Massachusetts TR
- NRHP reference No.: 90000187
- Added to NRHP: March 9, 1990

The Noyes-Parris House is a historic First Period house located in Wayland, Massachusetts.

== Description and history ==
The oldest portion of this house is a "single cell", three bays wide and two stories high, with what is now the central chimney of the house. It was built c. 1669, and extended to its present size, five bays wide, c. 1790. Peter Noyes, the builder, was one of Wayland's early settlers; his daughter, Dorothy, became the second wife of Rev. Samuel Parris, a major figure in the Salem witch trials.

The house was listed on the National Register of Historic Places on March 9, 1990.

== See also ==
- Hopestill Bent Tavern, 252 Old Connecticut Path, also a First Period building
- National Register of Historic Places listings in Middlesex County, Massachusetts

Setting for the film "The Inhabitants" 2015
