= W. G. T. Goodman =

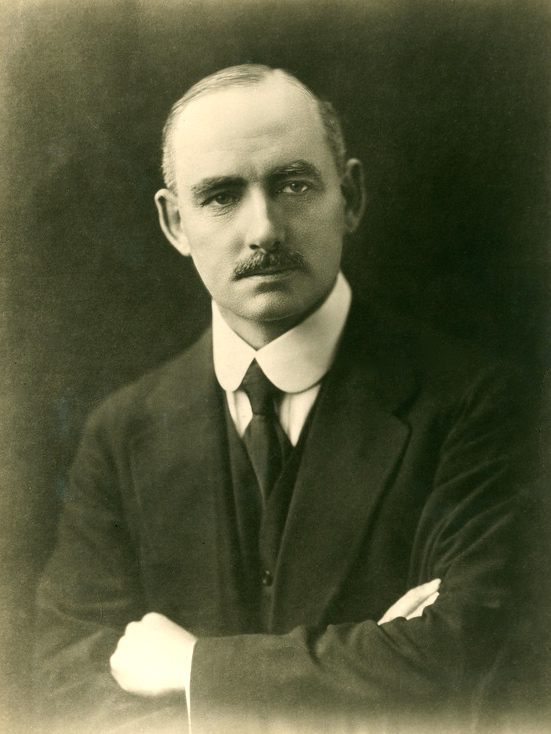
William George Toop Goodman circa 1925.

Sir William George Toop Goodman KBE MICE MIEE MIEAust (14 March 1872 – 4 February 1961), was an engineer and administrator who supervised the installation of New Zealand's first electric tramway and went on to oversee the foundation and growth of the Municipal Tramways Trust in Adelaide, South Australia.

== Early life ==
William Goodman was born in Kent, either in St Peter's or Ramsgate, a son of William Henry Goodman and his wife Emma Ann Goodman, née Limeburner, and educated at St George's School in Ramsgate. He later studied at King's College London and perhaps Finsbury Technical College. (Note: Cumming & Moxham's They Built South Australia is alone in mentioning Finsbury Technical College, and the only one to mention part time study. It is also alone in mentioning Simpson & Co. of London.) He was articled to Squire & Newton of London, then joined Maudslay & Field. In 1891 he joined the firm variously reported as Poole & Wight or Poole & White and worked on the Blackpool electric tramways, the Liverpool electric railway, the City & South London electric railway, and the City & South London Railway. He has also been reported as working for Simpson and Co. of London, and for his father, who may have been a consulting engineer or a carpenter.

== Early engineering career ==
In 1894 Goodman may have visited America and Germany to gain further technical knowledge and experience. In October 1894 he was in Hobart, Tasmania as a representative of the Brush Electrical Engineering Company setting up that company's exhibit at the International Exhibition, then installing an electric lighting plant for the Mount Lyell Mine reducing works, and advising on the feasibility of installing a hydro-electric generator on the Zeehan Falls for a company floated by Samuel McLean.

In 1897 he joined the tramway construction branch of the Department of Public Works, New South Wales, and also served as an officer in the Sixth (Volunteer) Infantry Regiment. He next joined the Sydney engineering company Noyes Brothers for whom in May 1900 he travelled to New Zealand to install electric urban tramways to link with the Roslyn and Dunedin cable tramway systems, which had been designed and installed from 1881 by George Smith Duncan. He left Noyes Brothers in 1902 to take up an appointment as electrical engineer to the city of Dunedin, and was involved in the Waipori hydroelectric scheme, the Christchurch refuse destructor, tramways for Petone and Hutt, and Auckland city lighting.

== Municipal Tramways Trust ==
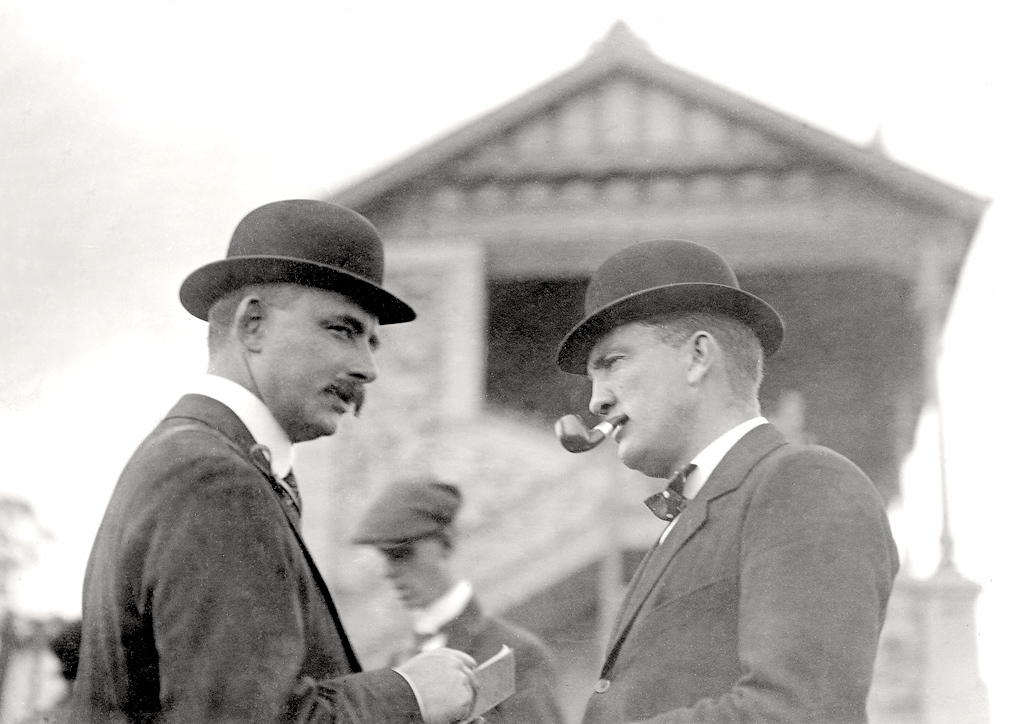
W.G.T. Goodman (left) with a friend at an Adelaide race meeting, circa 1920.

In 1907 Goodman take up the position of electrical engineer with Adelaide's Municipal Tramways Trust.

Adelaide had an extensive network of horse-drawn trams, all privately owned, but Adelaide, usually in the vanguard of social reform, had fallen badly behind the other colonies in the modernisation of its public transport. After a referendum on 8 February 1902 which decisively opted for a private enterprise, as against a Municipal or Government, takeover and electrification of the lines, a Tramways Purchase Act was passed. It enabled businessman Francis Hugh Snow to buy out these operators and to convert to electric traction, giving him a time limit of three years. After Snow failed to raise the required capital an Electric Traction Act of 1904 authorised the Government to make offers to these seven companies for the purchase of their leases and assets, which if rejected would be put in the hands of an arbitrator.

Eventually a takeover price of £280,000 was agreed upon and the Municipal Tramways Trust Act was passed in 1906. The Trust consisted of eight members: two nominated by the Governor, and two each from the Adelaide City Council, the Suburban Corporations, and the District Councils (those further out, which included Burnside and Mitcham). The Trust appointed the State's Engineer in Chief, Alexander Bain Moncrieff CMG (c. 1845–1928) as chairman, and advertised for a tramways engineer. Goodman was their unanimous choice; he started on the job in May 1907; one of his first appointments was his assistant John Bowman (1867–1951), a graduate of Sydney University who had worked with him in Sydney and in Dunedin. Within twelve months Goodman had called for contracts to the value of £457,000.

The following year he was further appointed chief engineer and general manager. Goodman retired from the MTT in 1950 at the age of 78.

Other highlights of Goodman's professional life included the following.

=== Royal Commission into public transport Auckland, New Zealand ===
In 1928 he and Alfred Edward Edwards? of Sydney were appointed to a Royal Commission chaired by J. S. Barton of Whanganui, into the tram service in Auckland where the introduction of competing private bus services had resulted in crippling financial losses to the tram service and financial failure of the bus companies. Having buses servicing outlying areas created expectations that the services would continue, leading to compulsory takeover of uneconomic routes by district councils, which were then saddled with recurring debt.

The terms of enquiry were:

- The adequacy, efficiency and suitability of the existing transport system maintained by the Auckland City Council and other existing transport services, as regards administration, equipment, working and financial provisions.
- The working and effect in the district of the provisions of the Motor Omnibus Traffic Act, 1920, and its regulations.
- The working and effect in the district of other statutes and regulations affecting vehicular transport.
- The suitability for the district of motor omnibus transport, either in conjunction with or as an adjunct to tramway transport.
- The most suitable form of transport for localities within and localities beyond the tram termini; whether services for such localities should be feeder services or through services or a combination of both; whether and to what extent such services should be conducted by local bodies or any other public management or by private enterprise; and whether and to what extent such services should be under the control of local bodies or any other public control.
- The desirability of establishing a transport board for the district or any part of it, and if so, with what constitution, powers of control, powers of undertaking transport services and means of obtaining funds for its purposes, and whether such a board, if established, should take over all or any existing transport services, and if so upon what terms.

The Commission's report, handed to Parliament in late July 1928 made the following recommendations

- That the Omnibus Act is justifiable to curb abuses which may result from uncontrolled competition, and to protect publicly owned services from unfair competition.
- That the licensing of transport services (as is the case with licensing of drivers and vehicles) should be subject to annual renewal subject to conditions having been met.
- That a surcharge of 2d. provided by section 10 of the Act for protection of municipal tramways was fair.
- That the tram affords the most suitable form of transport in the city and closely settled suburban areas.
- That the pneumatic-tyred petrol-driven motor-omnibus is the best form of transport beyond the reach of tramways.
- That buses should not be limited to acting as a feeder service to a tram terminus, as this requires passengers to disembark and re-embark, and also complicates extraction of fares, but where possible should provide a through service.
- That where a public utility is of a nature that it should be wholly or substantially a monopoly it should be publicly and not privately owned and operated, but in fringe areas the owning and controlling authority should, under proper conditions, permit and license private services.

=== Committee of Enquiry into the Hume reservoir ===
In May 1929 the three States with a vital interest in the Hume Dam, New South Wales, South Australia, and Victoria, impatient with progress of its construction, called for an enquiry. Commonwealth Minister for Works William Gibson appointed three commissioners: Goodman, Edgar Ritchie and EH Graves.

Its terms of reference were:

- Whether the costs in regard to earthwork, concrete work, etc. are reasonable
- The reasons why the estimates of cost, particularly in regard to road and rail deviations, so largely exceed those previously furnished
- The reasons for the additional costs not having been anticipated when these estimates were being prepared;
- Whether the work in connection with the acquisition of land and compensation for land affected by the works has been satisfactorily done;
- The probable cost of completing the works with particular relation to the latest estimate thereof; and
- Whether any and what changes in the present programme should be made in the interests of efficiency or proper economy.

The recommendations and outcome of this enquiry do not appear to have been made public.

=== Railway Investigation Committee (South Australia) ===
On 27 May 1930, at the onset of the Great Depression in Australia and with a serious drought gripping South Australia, the Hill Government appointed Goodman to head a committee to investigate the control and administration of the South Australian Railways and the causes of the heavy, and increasing, losses incurred. (Note: The committee has been frequently referred to as a "Royal Commission on Railways", including in contemporary newspaper reports and in Goodman's entry in the Australian Dictionary of Biography. However, the body was a committee appointed by the South Australian Executive Council; if it had been a royal commission it would have been constituted by letters patent under the prerogative powers of the state's governor. It therefore does not appear in the List of South Australian Royal Commissions.) The other members of the committee were Charles Miscamble (former Railways Commissioner of Tasmania), John W. Wainwright (Assistant Auditor-General), and Archibald McInnes (secretary of the Boilermakers' Society). The inquiry was instigated only two weeks after the return to the United States of Railways Commissioner William Webb, who had been eight years in the job. Webb had become unpopular with the government for a number of reasons. Although South Australia was beginning to feel the effects of the depression evident in all states, much of the loss of revenue in the state was blamed on the railways. Most of the witnesses at the hearings were loyal to Webb, but the committee concluded that despite Webb's legacy being a greatly upgraded railway system, his ideas were too ambitious for the times; many of Webb's reforms had been expensive and extravagant, and had damaged the state's economy. Chief among their recommendations was that management of the railways should be run as a business on behalf of the taxpayers, removed from political influence, and be controlled by a board of six members selected on a non-party basis, with only the director having railway experience.

== Other activities ==
- Goodman joined The Institution for Electrical Engineers in 1899 and served on the South Australian Centre Committee from 1937 to 1946.
- He served as chairman of the South Australian Housing Trust 1937–1944.
- He was a member of the Council of the University of Adelaide 1913–1954.
- He was appointed to the Motor Omnibus Board in March 1927.

His hobbies included flying, deep-sea diving and music.

He had interests in a number of private companies.

== Family ==
He married Florence Letitia Attreed ( – 1956) on 7 January 1893. While in Adelaide the family lived at "Lea Lodge", Strangways Terrace, North Adelaide 1909–1916; LeFevre Terrace, North Adelaide 1917; Brougham Place, North Adelaide 1928–1952; and 58 Palmer Place, North Adelaide 1932–1949 (sic). Their children included:

- Cyril William Goodman (30 December 1893 – 1978), an electrical engineer, married Ruth Ethel Muriel Butler (20 January 1897 – c. September 1976) on 28 April 1917. She was a daughter of Sir Richard Butler.
- Raymond George Goodman (c. September 1896 – ) champion rifle shooter Adelaide University 1919, served as Captain in World War I, moved to Victoria 1923.
- Eldest daughter Doris Florence Louise "Dolly" Goodman ( –1986) married Sydney Chester Thomas (1895–1968) on 15 November 1922.
- Second daughter Gwendoline Letitia "Gwen" Goodman (1905–1998), married Andrew Tennant (c. 1899–1974) of "The Gap" and "Princess Royal" stations, Burra, on 11 October 1928. Andrew was a grandson of Andrew Tennant MP. Both were interred at the North Road cemetery.
- Third daughter Joan Goodman (18 October 1907 – ) was engaged to Arthur Rymill (1907–1989) in 1932 but married Hurtle Cummins Morphett MC (1906–1992), son of George Hurtle Cummins Morphett (1877–1916), a descendant of Sir John Morphett, on 16 March 1937.
- Youngest daughter Zella Emmeline "Zellie" Goodman (1912–2010), married (William) Kenneth Craig (1915–1996) of "Arrawatta", Deniliquin on 7 June 1941.

== Death ==
Following a three year hospitalisation, Goodman died at College Park on 4 February 1961, aged 88. He was buried at North Road Cemetery, Nailsworth.

== Recognition ==
- Goodman was knighted in the 1932 New Year Honours "for public services to the State of South Australia".
- He was awarded the Peter Nicol Russell Memorial Medal by the Institution of Engineers Australia in 1945.
- A historic MTT building on Hackney Road (now part of the Adelaide Botanic Garden) was named the Goodman Building after him.
- A former tram bridge in Holland Street, Thebarton was named the Sir William Goodman Bridge when reopened as part of a cycleway in September 2014.

== Sources ==
Radcliffe, John C., 'Goodman, Sir William George Toop (1872–1961)', in Bede Nairn and Geoffrey Serle (eds), Australian Dictionary of Biography, vol. 9, Melbourne University Press, Melbourne, 1983, pp. 48–49. Also available at https://adb.anu.edu.au/biography/goodman-sir-william-george-toop-6423.

'Goodman, William George Toop', Trove, National Library of Australia, 2009, http://nla.gov.au/nla.party-1475625. Details MCCARTHY, G.J. Created: 20 October 1993, Last modified: 4 February 2010 Cite this: http://www.eoas.info/biogs/P001252b.htm Encyclopedia of Australian Science 2015
