= Mount Noyes =

Mountain in Banff NP, Alberta, Canada

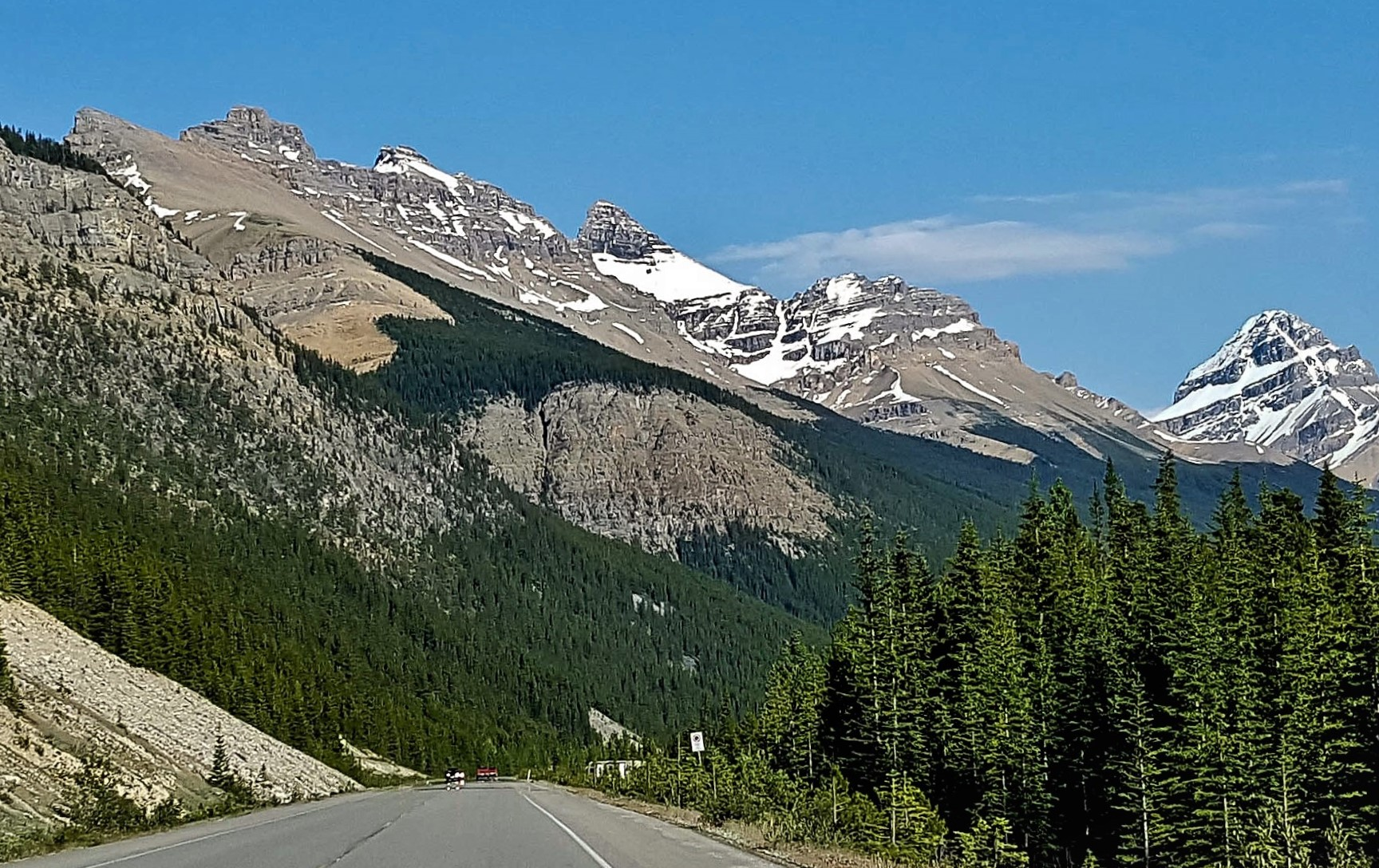
- Mt. Noyes from southbound Icefields Parkway (Mount Weed to right)

Highest point
- Elevation: 3,085 m (10,121 ft)
- Prominence: 296 m (971 ft)
- Parent peak: Quill Peak (3,124 m)
- Isolation: 5.91 km (3.67 mi)
- Listing: Mountains of Alberta
- Coordinates: 51°49′22″N 116°32′52″W

Geography
- Location within Alberta Location within Canada
- Country: Canada
- Province: Alberta
- Protected area: Banff National Park
- Parent range: Murchison Group; Canadian Rockies
- Topo map: NTS 82N15 Mistaya Lake

Geology
- Rock age: Cambrian
- Rock type: Sedimentary

Climbing
- First ascent: 1902
- Easiest route: Scramble

Mount Noyes is a 3,080-metre (10,100-foot) mountain summit located in the Mistaya River valley of Banff National Park, in the Canadian Rockies of Alberta, Canada. Mount Noyes is situated at the confluence of Silverhorn Creek and Mistaya River, 3.5 km northwest of Mount Weed, and 9.2 km east of Howse Peak. Its nearest higher peak is Mount Patterson, 8.55 km (5.31 mi) to the south. Topographic relief is significant as it rises over 1,380 metres above the Icefields Parkway in two km.

== History ==
The mountain was named by J. Norman Collie and Hugh M. Stutfield in 1898 for Rev. Charles Lathrop Noyes (1851–1923) of the Appalachian Mountain Club, who climbed in the Rockies and made several first ascents, such as Mount Balfour, Mount Gordon, and Mount Lefroy (the latter two with Collie). The mountain's name was officially adopted in 1924 by the Geographical Names Board of Canada.

The first ascent of the peak was made in 1902 by J. Norman Collie, Hugh Stutfield, Herman Woolley, and George M. Weed.

== Geology ==
Like other mountains in Banff Park, the mountain is composed of sedimentary rock laid down during the Precambrian to Jurassic periods. Formed in shallow seas, this sedimentary rock was pushed east and over the top of younger rock during the Laramide orogeny.

== Climate ==
Based on the Köppen climate classification, Mount Noyes is located in a subarctic climate zone with cold, snowy winters, and mild summers. Temperatures can drop below -20 °C with wind chill factors below -30 °C. This climate supports a glacier on the north slope. Precipitation runoff from Mount Noyes drains into the Mistaya River, a tributary of the North Saskatchewan River.

== See also ==
- List of mountains in the Canadian Rockies
- Geography of Alberta
