= Noye (disambiguation) =

The Noye is a river in northern France.

Noye may also refer to:

- Kenneth Noye (born 1947), British criminal
- Fred C. Noye (born 1946), politician in Pennsylvania, USA
- Noah in Noye's Fludde, Benjamin Britten's opera about the Bible's Noah, ark and flood

== See also ==
- Noyes (disambiguation)
