= China Books =

China Books, Inc. (formerly known as China Books & Periodicals, Inc.) is the oldest distributor of books, periodicals, and other media and educational products from China in the United States. It is a wholesale and retail distributor of books published and printed in China, and it also publishes and distributes academically-focused as well as general interest books about Chinese history and culture under its own imprint using the ISBN-13 prefix 978-0-8351.

China Books was founded in Chicago in 1960 by Dr. Henry Halsey Noyes (1910–2004). Noyes was born in Guangzhou, China into a third generation Presbyterian missionary family. Noyes’ determination to distribute what was then considered "highly sensitive" material from China during the Cold War shocked Americans, where information from China was scarce. Since 1969, China Books has sold over a million copies of Quotations from Chairman Mao Tse-tung, more popularly known as the Little Red Book. During China's Period of Reform and Opening-Up in the early 1980s, travel and tourism to China, together with robust cultural exchange programs, had reached a new high, and China Books thrived with retail stores in San Francisco, Chicago, and New York, at its peak employing over 50 people. Business declined after the Tiananmen Square Crackdown of 1989 but rebounded in later years with renewed interest in learning Chinese language, cultural immersion curriculum, and the Beijing Olympic Games. China Books was instrumental in providing books, newspapers, and magazines from China which were essential to the establishing of post-1949 Chinese political and reference materials at university and other research libraries across the United States, including the Hoover Institution at Stanford University and the former Center for Chinese Studies Library (now the C.V. Starr East Asian Library) at U.C. Berkeley, among many others.

In 2002, China Books was jointly acquired by Sino United Publishing (Holdings) Ltd. Hong Kong and the China International Communications Group Beijing. As of 2012, China Books, together with its sister publishing company Long River Press and Cypress Book (U.S.) Co. became part of Sinomedia International Group. Its offices are located in South San Francisco, California.

Some of the significant books published by China Books include "All the Tea in China" by Kit Chow and Ione Kramer; "Ten Years of Madness" by Feng Jicai; "Bamboo Women" by Nona Mock Wyman; and the dual Suzhou/Hangzhou cultural histories by Stephen Koss.

== References and external links ==
- Official website
- Publishers Weekly. China Takes Over China Books: The Longer Story — Published November 10, 2003. This article is about the history of China Books and the sale of the company to Sino United Publishing and China International Publishing Group.
- Publishers Weekly."Looking for China's Murakami" — Published September 24, 2007. This article is about the potential market of books from China
- Publishers Weekly.Digging to China — Published October 16, 2007. This article is about the cultural differences between Chinese and American publishers. Note:
