= Noyce =

Noyce, an English surname derived from the more common surname Noyes, may refer to:

- Dora Noyce, Scottish brothel keeper
- Graham Noyce, English motocross racer
- Jonathan Noyce, English musician
- Mark Noyce, English actor and film director
- Phillip Noyce, Australian film director
- Robert Noyce, American inventor and Intel co-founder
- Wilfrid Noyce, English mountaineer and author
