= Newbold Noyes Jr. =

American journalist

Newbold Noyes Jr. (August 10, 1918 – December 18, 1997) was an American publisher, reporter, and newspaper editor.

After graduating from Yale University in 1941, Noyes joined The Washington Star newspaper, which had been co-owned by his family since 1867. At the time, his grandfather, Frank Brett Noyes, was president and his father, Newbold Noyes, Sr., was associate editor. The younger Noyes served as a war correspondent in the 1940s.

In 1963, Noyes became the newspaper's editor. He also served as a trustee of the Washington Journalism Center and the Raymond Clapper Memorial Association, sponsor of the Raymond Clapper Memorial Award, presented to "any Washington-based daily newspaper reporter whose work most closely approximated the ideals of fair and painstaking reporting, and the good craftsmanship of Raymond Clapper."

In his 1982 book Witness to Power, John Ehrlichman discusses a letter from Noyes to President Richard Nixon sent in March 1973. According to Ehrlichman, if the president had responded to the letter differently, it could have been the catalyst for a different outcome for the Nixon presidency.

In 1975, Noyes' tenure as editor and his family's as co-owners both ended when control of the Star's parent company was sold to Joe L. Allbritton, a Houston businessman. Allbritton in turn sold the paper in 1978 to Time Warner (then known as Time Inc.), which closed it in 1981.

== Personal life ==
A longtime resident of Sorrento, Maine, Noyes married Beatrice "Beppie" Noyes (July 20, 1919 – July 3, 2007), an American author and illustrator.
