= General Noyes =

General Noyes may refer to:

- Cyril Noyes (1885–1946), British Indian Army general
- Edward Follansbee Noyes (1832–1890), Union Army brevet brigadier general
- Henry E. Noyes (1839–1919), U.S. Army brigadier general
