= Hopestill Bent Tavern =

Historic tavern in Massachusetts, United States

- U.S. National Register of Historic Places
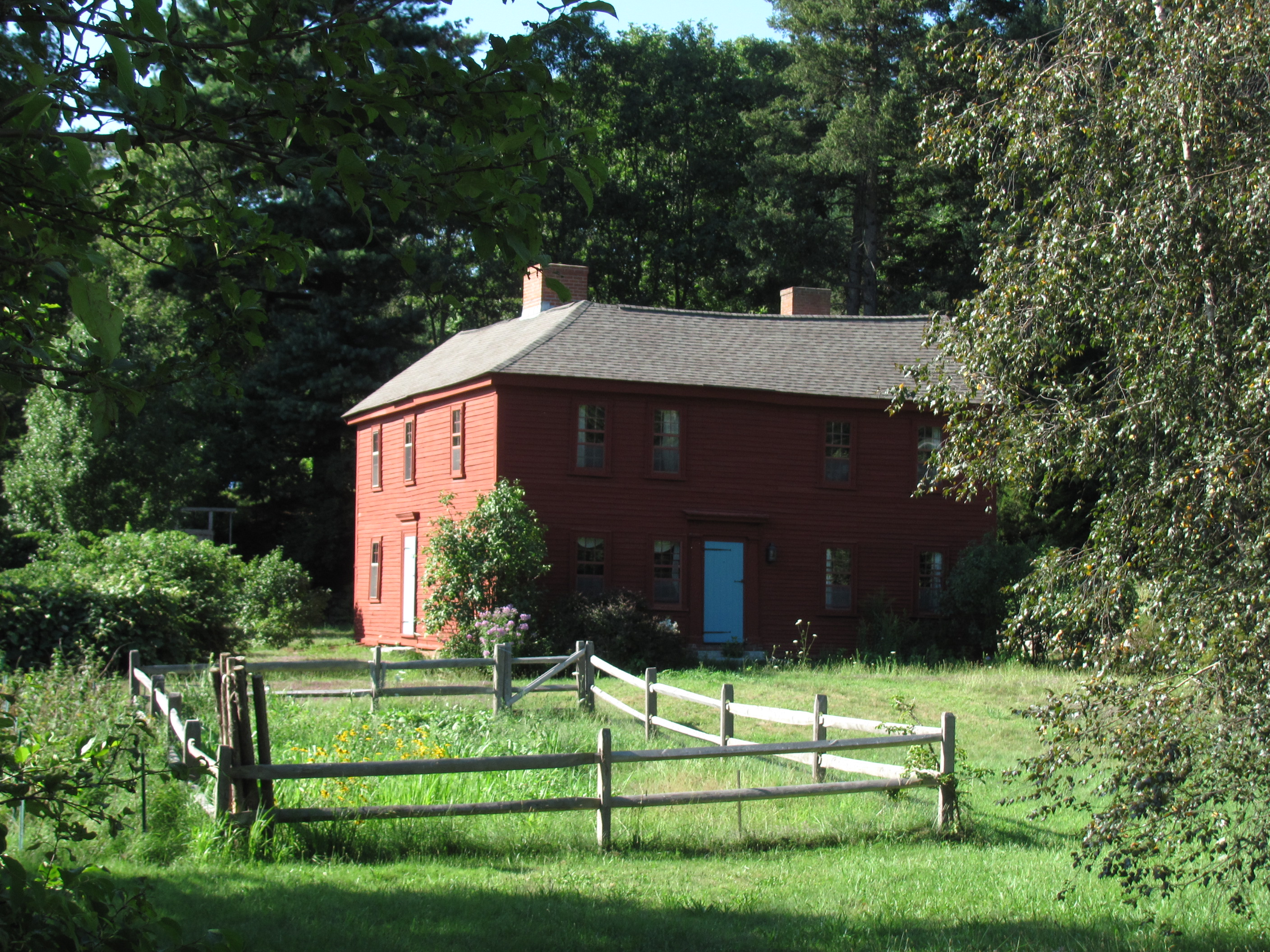
- Hopestill Bent Tavern

- Location within Massachusetts Location within the United States
- Location: 252 Old Connecticut Path, Wayland, Massachusetts
- Coordinates: 42°20′30″N 71°22′14″W
- Built: 1710
- Architectural style: Colonial
- MPS: First Period Buildings of Eastern Massachusetts TR
- NRHP reference No.: 90000188
- Added to NRHP: March 9, 1990

The Hopestill Bent Tavern is a historic First Period tavern (now a private residence) in Wayland, Massachusetts, United States. The oldest portion of this 2 1/2-story building was built on this site c. 1710, and consisted of two rooms with a central chimney. Around 1800 a second First Period structure was moved to the site and attached to the first, giving the building most of its present form. The building is also unusual for the period in that some of its rooms have no fireplace, and that the upstairs exhibits evidence of significant reuse of older building materials, a practice that was generally restricted to the attic or basement. The building exhibits modest Federal styling, in keeping with the c. 1800 alterations.

Its builder and first proprietor was Hopestill Bent (1672–1725). Hopestill Bent fought in King William's War (one of the French and Indian Wars). Hopestill Bent was the great-grandfather of Silas Bent Jr. and great-great-grandfather of Charles Bent, the trader and first territorial Governor of New Mexico during the Mexican-American War

The building was listed on the National Register of Historic Places in 1990.

== See also ==
- National Register of Historic Places listings in Middlesex County, Massachusetts
