= Mount Habel =

Mountain on the Alberta/British Columbia boundary in Canada

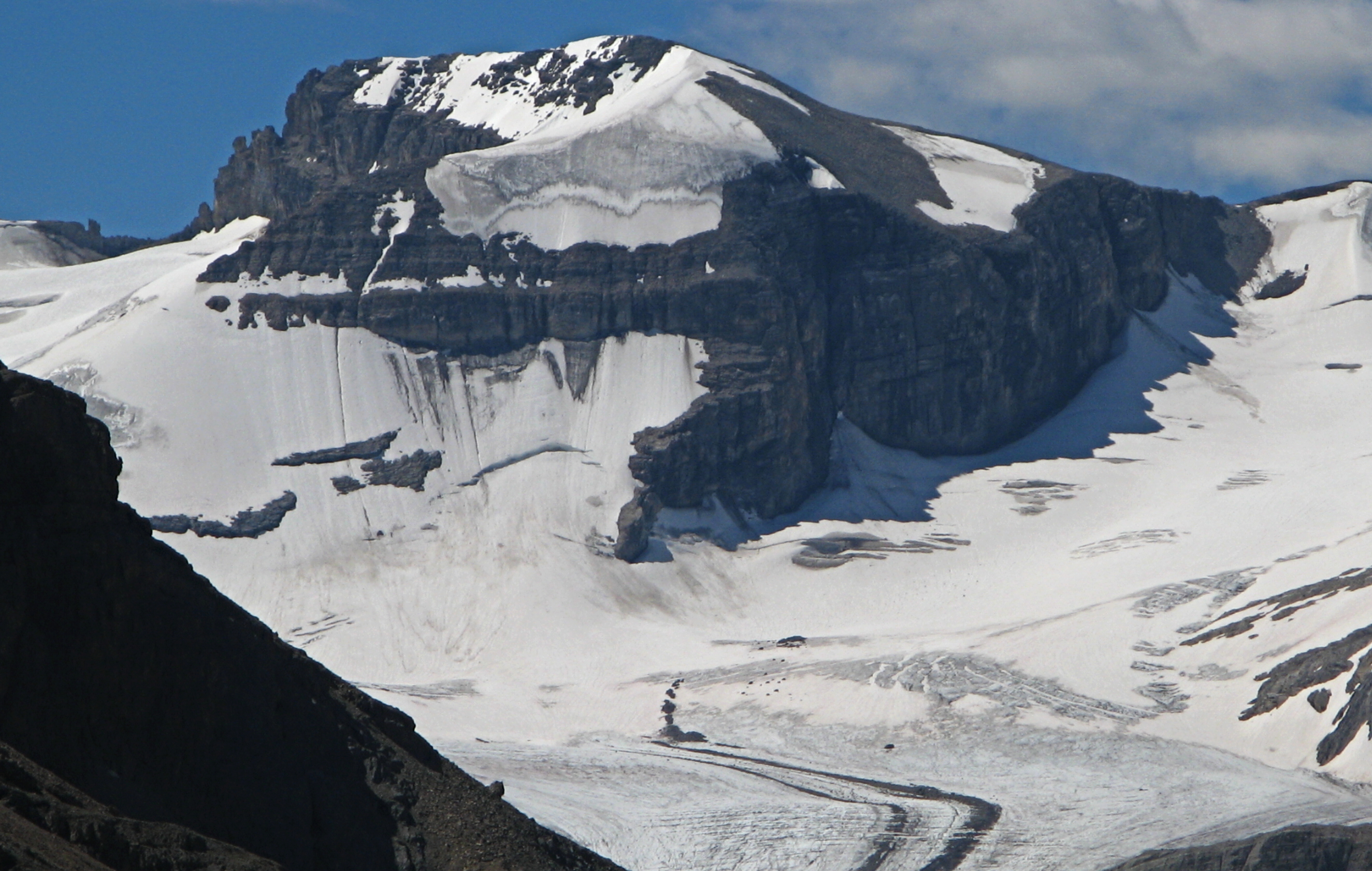
- Mount Habel seen from Peyto Lake Overlook

Highest point
- Elevation: 3,073 m (10,082 ft)
- Prominence: 232 m (761 ft)
- Parent peak: Mount Baker (3180 m)
- Listing: Mountains of Alberta; Mountains of British Columbia
- Coordinates: 51°38′55″N 116°34′17″W

Geography
- Location within Alberta Location within British Columbia Location within Canada
- Interactive map of Mount Habel
- Country: Canada
- Provinces: Alberta and British Columbia
- Protected area: Banff National Park
- Parent range: Waputik Mountains
- Topo map: NTS 82N10 Blaeberry River

Climbing
- First ascent: 1923 A. Geoffrion, J.W.A. Hickson, Edward Feuz Jr.

Mount Habel is a 3,073-metre (10,082-foot) mountain summit located in Banff National Park on the Continental Divide along the border of Alberta and British Columbia in the Waputik Mountains, part of the Canadian Rockies. It was named in 1986 after Jean Habel. Jean Habel was a German geographer who explored the Canadian Rockies and in 1897 was the first to set foot on the Wapta Icefield which surrounds Mount Habel.

== Geology ==
Like other mountains in Banff Park, Mount Habel is composed of sedimentary rock laid down during the Precambrian to Jurassic periods. Formed in shallow seas, this sedimentary rock was pushed east and over the top of younger rock during the Laramide orogeny.

== Climate ==
Based on the Köppen climate classification, Mount Habel is located in a subarctic climate zone with cold, snowy winters, and mild summers. Winter temperatures can drop below −20 °C (−4 °F) with wind chill factors below −30 °C (−22 °F).

== Gallery ==
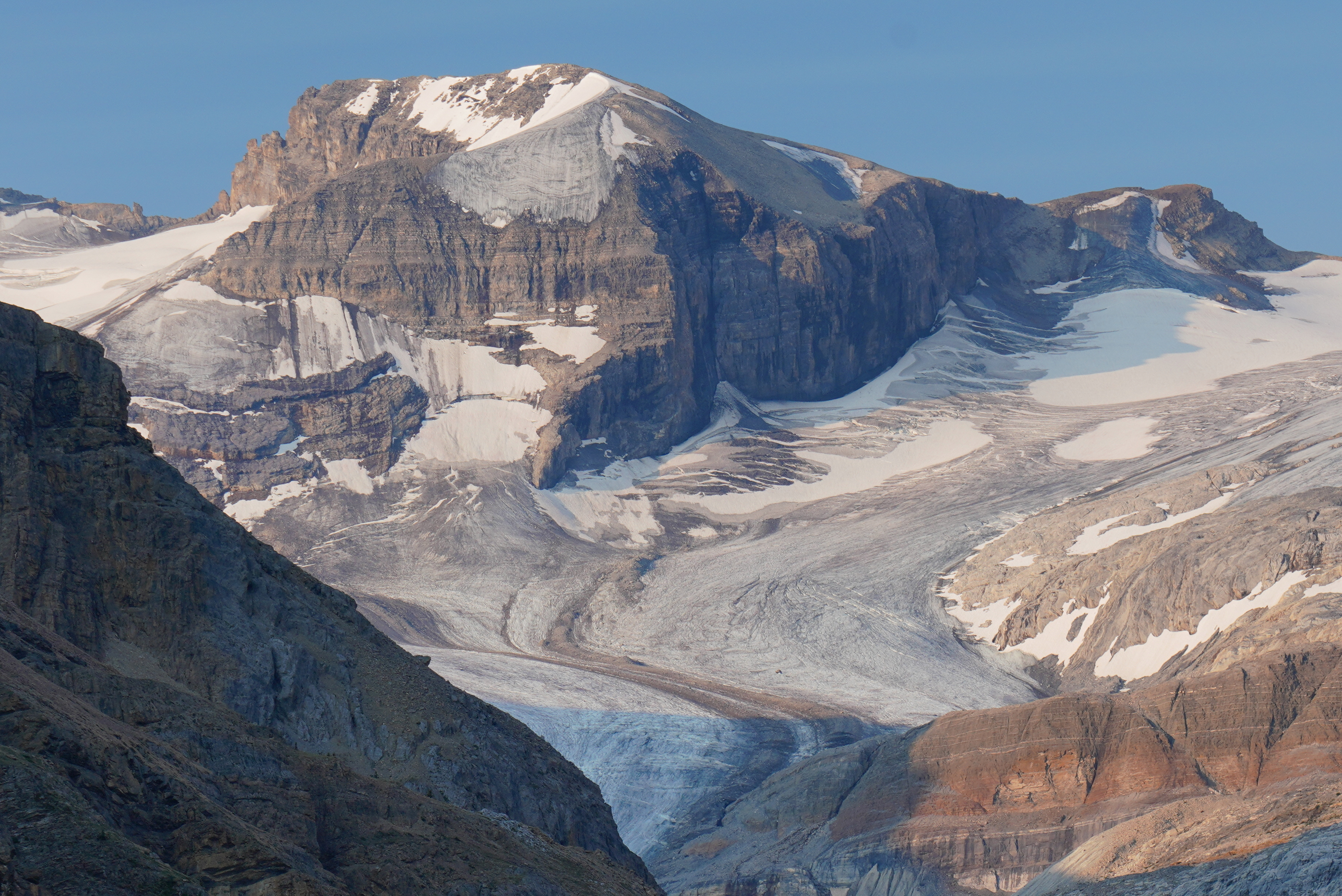
Mt. Habel

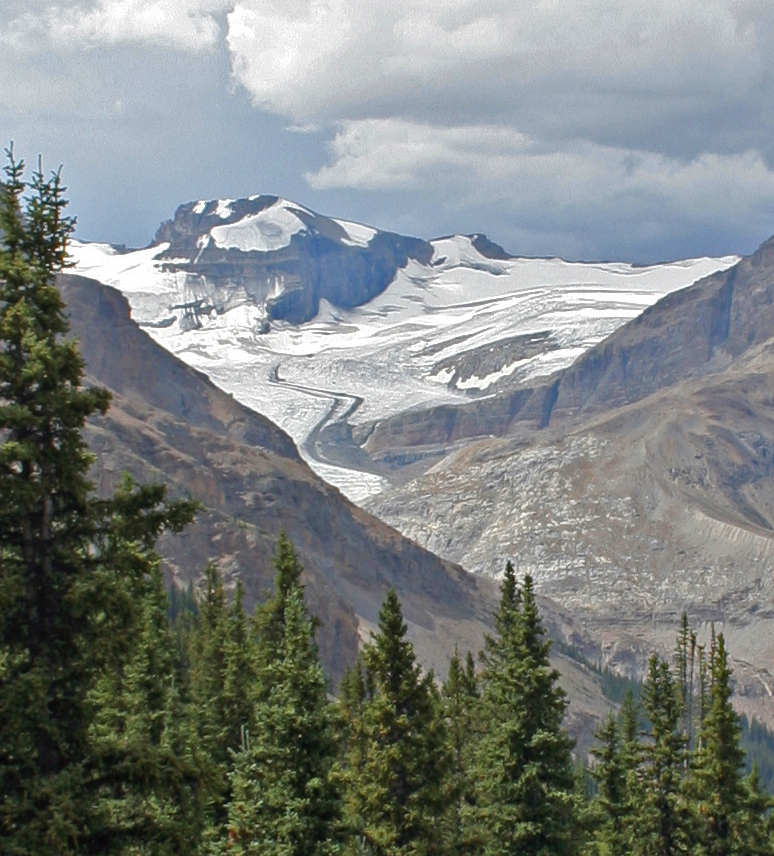
Mount Habel from Peyto Lake overlook

== See also ==
- List of peaks on the Alberta–British Columbia border
