= Mount Dent =

Mountain in the country of Canada

- Location within Alberta Location within British Columbia Location within Canada

Highest point
- Elevation: 3,267 m (10,719 ft)
- Prominence: 195 m (640 ft)
- Parent peak: Mount Freshfield (3337 m)
- Listing: Mountains of Alberta; Mountains of British Columbia
- Coordinates: 51°45′20″N 116°58′09″W

Geography
- Country: Canada
- Provinces: Alberta and British Columbia
- Protected area: Banff National Park
- Parent range: Park Ranges
- Topo map: NTS 82N15 Mistaya Lake

Climbing
- First ascent: 1910 J.E.C. Eaton, B. Otto, H. Burgener (Guide)

Mount Dent is a summit that straddles the border between British Columbia and Alberta, Canada.

Mount Dent was named in 1899 by J. Norman Collie after Clinton Thomas Dent, an English mountaineer and past president of the UK Alpine Club.

== See also ==
- Geography of Alberta
- Geography of British Columbia
