= Beppie Noyes =

American author and illustrator

- Born: Beatrice Thelberg Spencer; July 20, 1919; Detroit, Michigan, U.S.
- Died: July 3, 2007 (aged 87); Sorrento, Maine, U.S.
- Other name: Beatrice Baldwin
- Occupations: Writer, illustrator
- Spouse(s): William Baldwin; Newbold Noyes Jr.

Beatrice "Beppie" Noyes (July 20, 1919 – July 3, 2007), born Beatrice Thelberg Spencer, was an American author and illustrator. She co-founded the Potomac Almanac, and wrote and illustrated two books for children.

== Early life and education ==
Spencer was born in Detroit, Michigan, the daughter of Richard Selden Spencer and Elizabeth Thelberg Spencer. Her father was an executive in the steel industry. Her grandmother Elizabeth B. Thelberg was a professor and the resident physician at Vassar College for 47 years.

Spencer attended the Liggett School in Michigan, and graduated from Vassar College in 1940, with a degree in theater.

== Career ==
Noyes lived in Potomac, Maryland, where she co-founded and illustrated the magazine Potomac Almanac, and was an active member of the Potomac Hunt. Her husband was the editor of the Washington Evening Star. In 1978, she wrote and illustrated her first book, Mosby, the Kennedy Center Cat, about the cat in the Kennedy Center. Her second book, Wigglesworth: The Caterpillar Who Wanted to Fly, followed in 1985.

Noyes and her husband retired to Frenchman Bay in 1987. There, she taught golf, and wrote extensively for the Frenchman's Bay Conservancy. These works were published in 2004 as Beppie's Musings, and featured many of her drawings. She also made a detailed, hand-drawn map of Sorrento, Maine.

== Publications ==
- Mosby, the Kennedy Center Cat (1978)
- Wigglesworth, The Caterpiller Who Wanted to Fly (1985)
- "Coping with Winter" (2000)
- Beppie's Musings (2004)

== Personal life ==
After a short marriage to William Howard Baldwin in 1942, she married war correspondent Newbold Noyes, Jr. Her second husband died in 1997, and her son Howard died in 2001. She died from a stroke at her home in Sorrento, Maine, on July 3, 2007, at the age of 87. She was survived by three children. Writer Nelsie Spencer is her niece.
