= William Noyes =

William Noyes may refer to:

- William Noyes (priest) (1568–1622), Anglican clergyman of Puritan teachings
- William A. Noyes (1857–1941), American analytical and organic chemist
- W. Albert Noyes Jr. (1898–1980), his son, American chemist
- William W. Noyes (1846–1910), American Civil War soldier and Medal of Honor recipient
- William Curtis Noyes (1805–1864), American jurist.
- William Leslie Noyes (1836–1908), American farmer and politician from New York
