= Observation Peak (Alberta) =

Mountain in Alberta, Canada

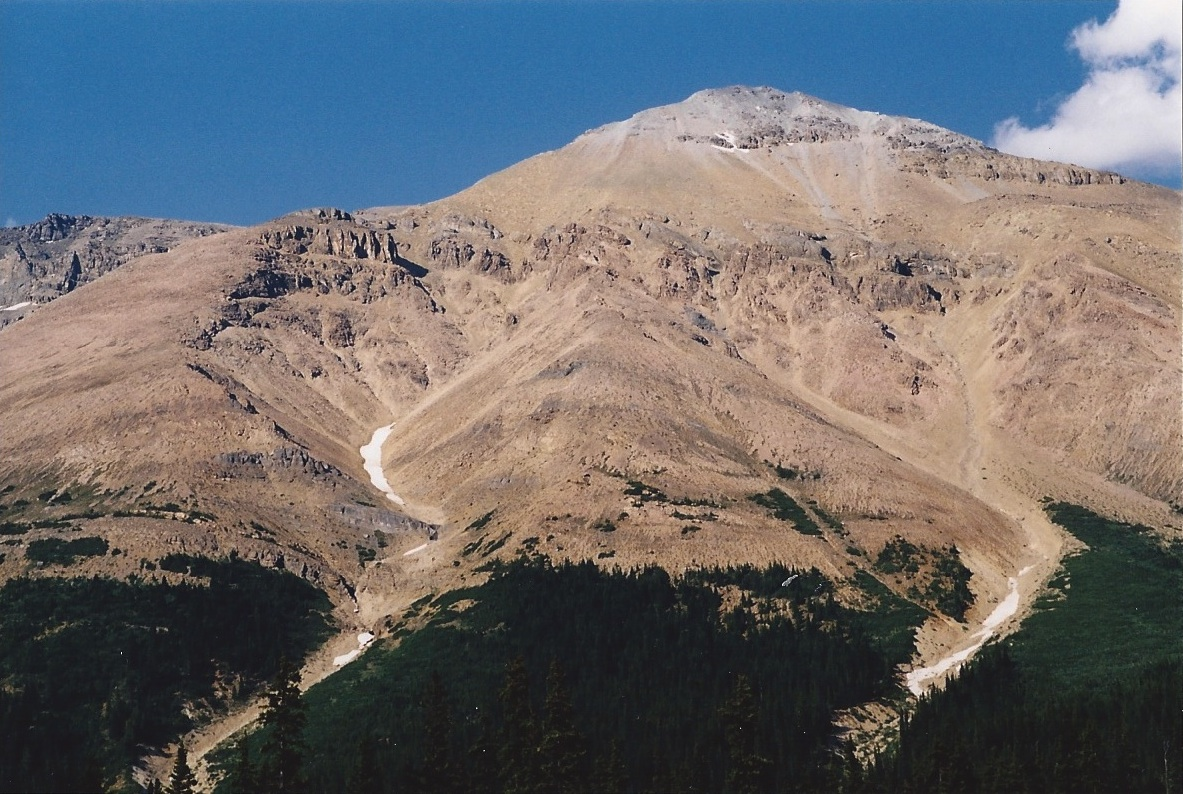
- Observation Peak, July 2003. Visible high point is the false summit.

Highest point
- Elevation: 3,174 m (10,413 ft)
- Prominence: 659 m (2,162 ft)
- Parent peak: Mount Loudon (3221 m)
- Listing: Mountains of Alberta
- Coordinates: 51°44′32″N 116°28′01″W

Geography
- Location within Alberta
- Interactive map of Observation Peak
- Country: Canada
- Province: Alberta
- Protected area: Banff National Park
- Parent range: Front Ranges
- Topo map: NTS 82N9 Hector Lake

Geology
- Rock age: Precambrian to Jurassic
- Mountain type: sedimentary rock

Climbing
- First ascent: 1895 Bill Peyto and Walter Wilcox
- Easiest route: easy/moderate scramble

Observation Peak is a 3,174-metre (10,413-foot) mountain summit located in Banff National Park, Alberta, Canada. The mountain can be seen from the Icefields Parkway near the Bow Summit.

The peak was named in 1898 by Charles L. Noyes, a Boston clergyman, who upon climbing to the top found it to have the best viewpoint he had ever reached.

The mountain can be scrambled using the western slopes and after reaching the top of the false summit, a 20-minute plod to the northwest leads to the true summit about 100 metres (328 ft) higher.

== Geology ==
Like other mountains in Banff Park, the mountain is composed of sedimentary rock laid down during the Precambrian to Jurassic periods. Formed in shallow seas, this sedimentary rock was pushed east and over the top of younger rock during the Laramide orogeny.

== Climate ==
Based on the Köppen climate classification, Observation Peak is located in a subarctic climate with cold, snowy winters, and mild summers. Temperatures can drop below −20 °C (−4 °F) with wind chill factors below −30 °C (−22 °F). Precipitation runoff from Observation Peak drains into the Mistaya River, a tributary of the North Saskatchewan River.

== Gallery ==
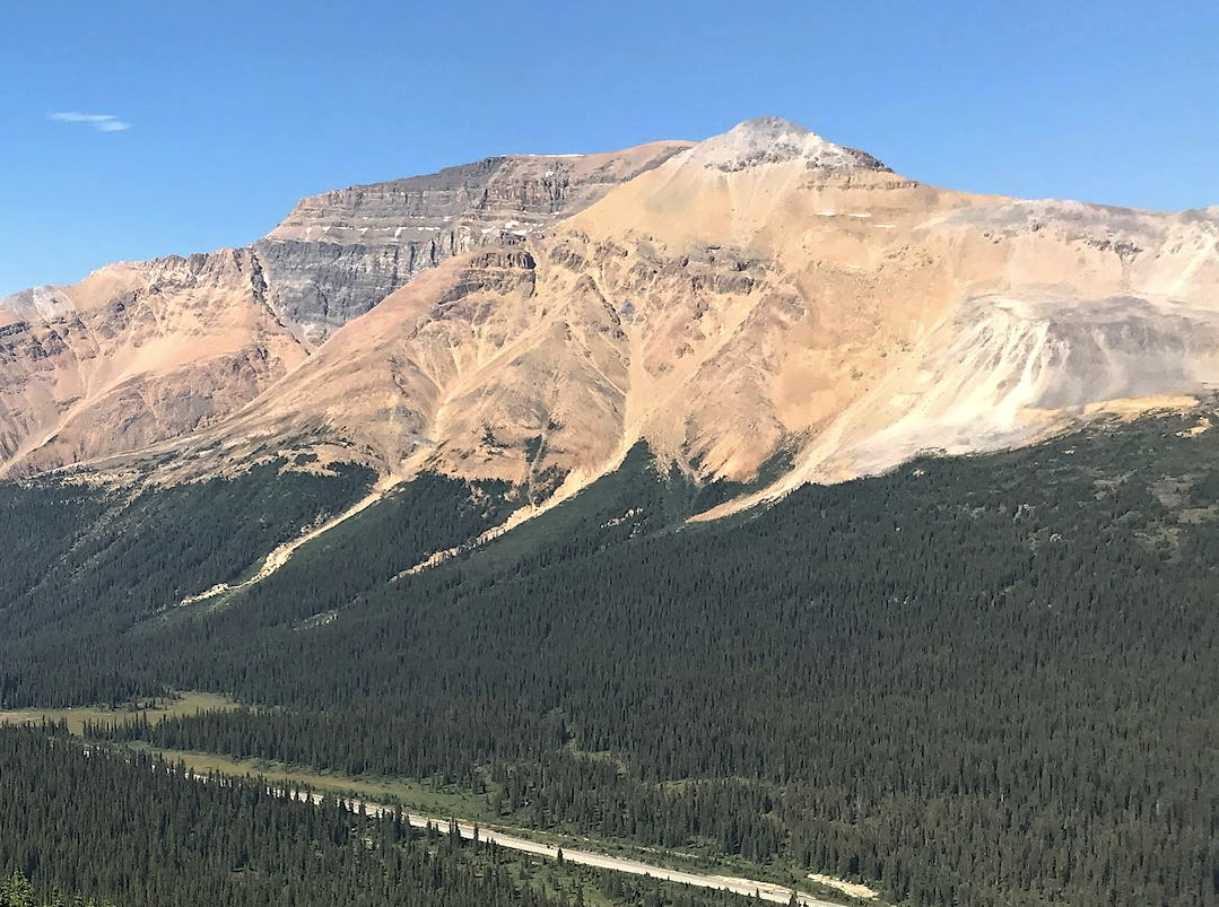
Observation Peak above the Icefields Parkway

== See also ==
- List of mountains of Canada
- Geography of Alberta
