= Noyes Cottage =

Historic house in New York, United States

- U.S. National Register of Historic Places
- U.S. Historic district – Contributing property
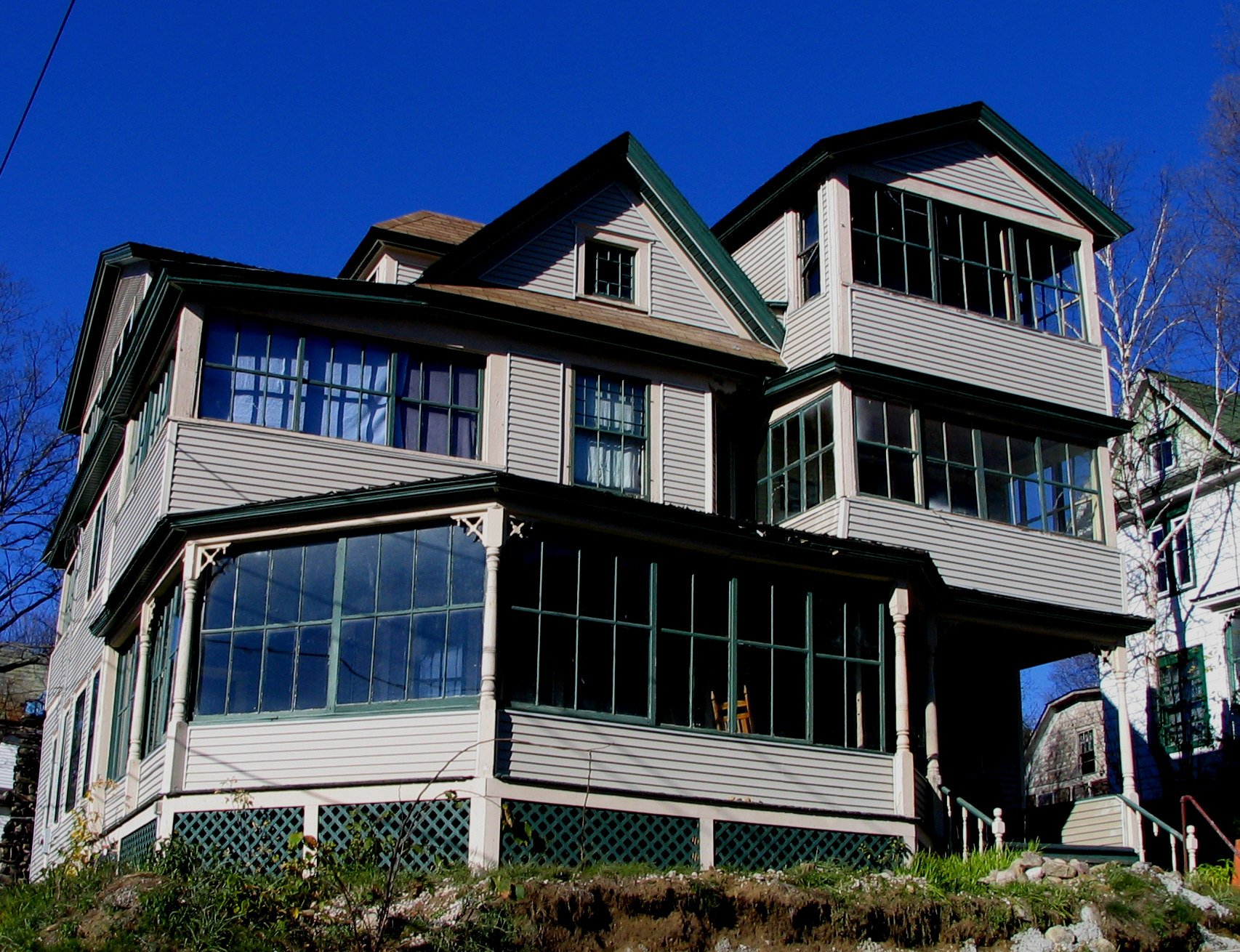
- Noyes Cottage, November 2007

- Location within New York Location within the United States
- Location: 16 Helen St., Saranac Lake, Harrietstown, New York, U.S.
- Coordinates: 44°19′37″N 74°7′40″W
- Area: less than one acre
- Built: 1898, 1908
- Architect: Blauvelt, Silas
- Architectural style: Queen Anne
- MPS: Saranac Lake MPS
- NRHP reference No.: 92001468
- Added to NRHP: November 6, 1992

Noyes Cottage is a historic cure cottage located at Saranac Lake in the town of Harrietstown, Franklin County, New York. It was built about 1898 and enlarged in 1908. It is a three-story, wood-frame dwelling in the Queen Anne style. It has a stone foundation and multi-gabled roof. It features six cure porches, including a two-story porch at the rear.

It was listed on the National Register of Historic Places in 1992. It is located in the Helen Hill Historic District.
