= Noyes Brothers =

Australian engineering firm

Noyes Brothers is an Australian engineering firm established in 1888 by Edward and Henry Noyes.

== History ==
Noyes Bros. was founded in Sydney in 1888 by Edward and Henry Noyes (see their biographies below), as importers of engineering products, then rapidly developed into engineering consultants and contractors servicing the rapidly developing transportation and mining businesses throughout Australasia.

In 1907 they converted the business into two separate companies: Noyes Brothers Limited in Sydney under Edward Noyes, and Noyes Brothers (Melbourne) Proprietary, Ltd. in Melbourne, with Henry Noyes as managing director.

Around 1991 the company was purchased by Clough Engineering, and traded as Noyes-Clough until 2004, when it was purchased by Project Solutions Australia.

== Some key people ==
=== Edward Noyes ===
Thomas Edward Woodhams Noyes (c. 1858 – 5 March 1920), always referred to as Edward Noyes, was born at Creaton, Northamptonshire, a son of Rev. Thomas Edward Noyes (c. 1830–1883) and his wife Jane Noyes, née Woodhams. He and his brother and sister Jane emigrated to New South Wales around 1886 and founded the firm of Noyes Brothers in Sydney in 1888. He formed the business into a limited company in 1907, and became the first governing director, a position he held up to the time of his death. He was also a director of Noyes Brothers (Melbourne) Proprietary, Ltd. He died at Medlow following a brief illness; two months after his close friend Edmund Barton, and in the same town. His wife, Catherine Campbell Noyes, died on 19 July 1942.

Edward was the author of a number of patents: for a device for perforating leather in the shape of letters in 1894, an improved wire rope in 1895, an improved airbrake controller in 1899, improved airbrake compressor and eggframes for incubators in 1900.

=== Henry Noyes ===
Henry Obed Noyes (20 June 1861 – 20 March 1922) was born at Creaton, Northamptonshire, a son of Rev. Thomas Edward Noyes. He, his brother and sister Jane emigrated to New South Wales around 1886 and founded the firm of Noyes Brothers in Sydney in 1888. They formed the business into a two limited companies in 1907, Edward remained in Sydney while Henry took over as governing director of Noyes Brothers (Melbourne). Henry was a recognised authority on steel, and was a member of the Iron and Steel Institute of Great Britain. He was also a member of the American Institute of Mining and Metallurgical Engineers and the American Institute of Mechanical Engineers. Under his direction the firm carried out large works, including electric lighting and railway construction. A significant project was the construction and electrification of the tramlines for the Prahran & Malvern Tramways Trust. During World War I, as vice-chairman of the Victorian Recruiting Committee, he consulted closely with Sir John Monash. He gave generously to Red Cross, donated valuable X-ray equipment. He was regarded as an authority on business and commercial procedure and was associated with some of the largest engineering firms of England and America.

He married Martha Elizabeth Halliday on 21 January 1891 and lived at "Holmby", Malvern Road, Malvern, Victoria. They had a son Edward and two daughters, Daisy and Lilian Elizabeth Noyes, who married John Humphrey England. Henry was survived by his second wife Winifred Noyes. Their home, "Holmby", on the west corner of Hopetoun Road and Malvern Road, Malvern, was designed by architect Beverley Ussher in the Queen Anne style.

The brothers' youngest sister Jane Noyes married James Brown on 2 July 1900.

=== J. H. D. Brearley ===
Joseph Henry D. Brearley (c. 1872 – 14 October 1941) was born in New South Wales and studied electrical engineering at Sydney University, then joined the staff of the New South Wales Government Railways. He joined Noyes Brothers, who had won a contract to install an electric tramway system in suburban Roslyn in Dunedin, New Zealand to link up with their cable tramway system. Brearley was needed to replace W. G. T. Goodman, the engineer who started on the contract, but had accepted a position with the city of Dunedin, then in 1907 with the Municipal Tramways Trust of Adelaide. He was to work with Goodman a few years later, after Noyes Bros. won the contract to electrify Adelaide's tramway system. Brearley was chief engineer with Noyes Bros. (Melbourne), and on the board of directors of that company for most of this time, taking on the position of chairman and managing director on the death of Henry Noyes, retiring in March 1932.

He also had mining interests, and was chairman of directors of the gold mine Morning Star at Wood's Point. He was a longtime member of Melbourne's Yorick Club, and their secretary when he died. He lived at Walsh Street, South Yarra, and was buried in Brighton Cemetery.

== Recognition ==
The Noyes Electrical Engineering Laboratory at the SA School of Mines, was named for the company after it had made considerable donations of electrical equipment to the School.
