= Henry Halsey Noyes =

Henry Halsey Noyes (1910 – June 22, 2005) was an American writer, publisher, teacher, and distributor of Chinese books and magazines.

== Biography ==
Born in Guangzhou, China, he was the son of Presbyterian missionaries William D. Noyes and Mary Stevenson. His mother was cousin to American statesman Adlai Stevenson.

The family relocated to Canada in 1919. While a student at Humberside Collegiate Institute in Toronto, he won the Jardine Prize for Poetry in 1930. Henry earned an MFA in English literature at the University of Toronto (1936) and a Ph.D. at the University of London in the same subject in 1938).

In 1960, he founded China Books and Periodicals, Inc., in Chicago. The business later relocated to San Francisco and became America's largest distributor of printed materials from China.

== Publications ==
- Noyes, Henry (1980). Hand over Fist. Boston: South End Press. ISBN 0-89608-026-9.
- Noyes, Henry (1989). China born: memories of a Westerner. London: Peter Owen. ISBN 0-7206-0748-5.
- Noyes, Henry (1989). China born: memories of a Maverick Bookman. San Francisco: China Books & Periodicals. ISBN 0-8351-2198-4.
- Noyes, Henry (1993). Valley of the Sun: Selected Poems. New Earth Publications. ISBN 0-915117-13-4.
- Noyes, Henry (2004). Fancher, D. (ed.). The Leader and Recorder's History of the Junction. Toronto: West Toronto Historical Society. p. 51. "Another View of the Movies". ISBN 0-9686636-1-3.
