= Mount Weed =

Mountain in Banff NP, Alberta, Canada

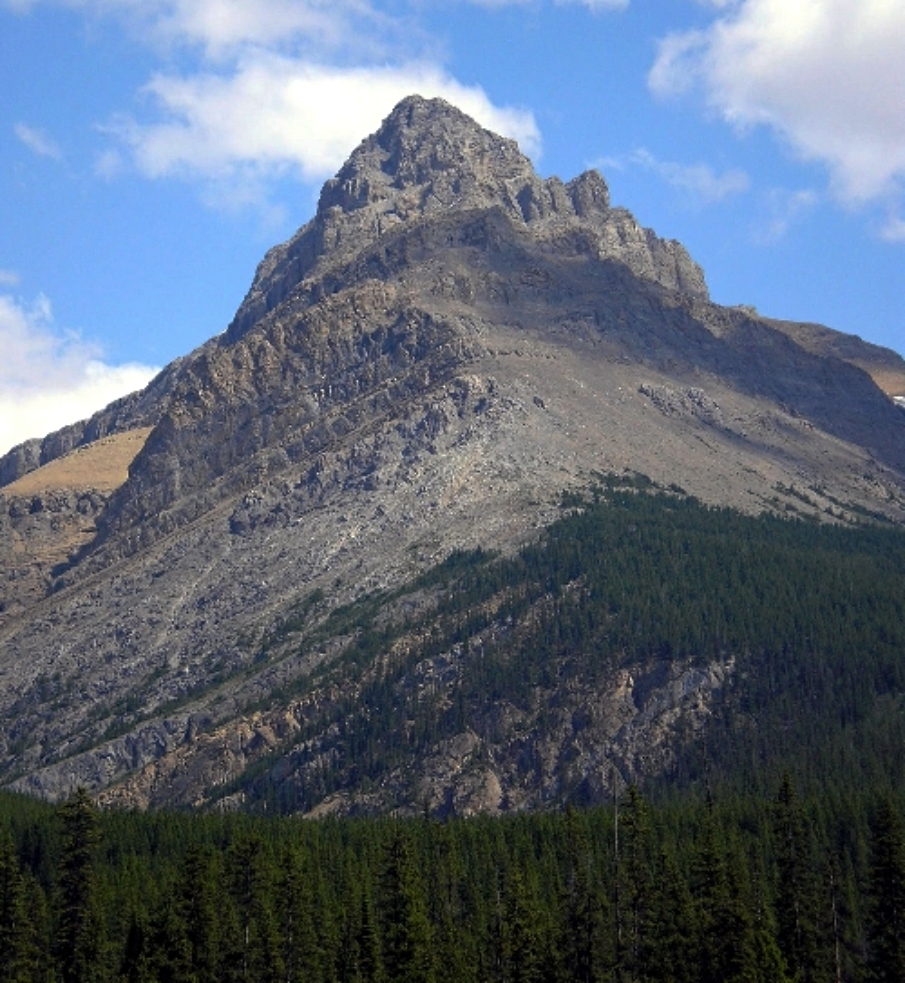
- Mount Weed seen from Icefields Parkway

Highest point
- Elevation: 3,080 m (10,100 ft)
- Prominence: 383 m (1,257 ft)
- Parent peak: Observation Peak (3174 m)
- Listing: Mountains of Alberta
- Coordinates: 51°47′32″N 116°31′41″W

Geography
- Location within Alberta Location within Canada
- Interactive map of Mount Weed
- Country: Canada
- Province: Alberta
- Protected area: Banff National Park
- Parent range: Murchison Group; Canadian Rockies
- Topo map: NTS 82N15 Mistaya Lake

Geology
- Rock age: Cambrian
- Rock type: Sedimentary

Climbing
- First ascent: 1936 by L. Gest, Mr. and Mrs. H. Kingman, H.S. Kingman Jr., W. Kingman, C.Hasler Jr.
- Easiest route: Scramble

Mount Weed is a 3,080-metre (10,100-foot) mountain summit located in the Mistaya River valley of Banff National Park, in the Canadian Rockies of Alberta, Canada. Mount Weed is situated at the confluence of Silverhorn Creek and Mistaya River, 3.5 kilometres southwest of Mount Noyes, 4.5 km east of Mistaya Lake, and 14 km north of Bow Lake. Its nearest higher peak is Mount Patterson, 5.82 km (3.62 mi) to the southwest. Patterson stands directly across the Mistaya River valley from Weed, and both are prominent features seen from the Icefields Parkway.

== History ==
The mountain was named by J. Norman Collie in 1902 for George Marsten Weed (1864-1948) of the Appalachian Mountain Club, who climbed in the Rockies and made several first ascents. Collie and Weed were together in a party which made the first ascent of Mount Forbes on August 10, 1902. The mountain's name was officially adopted in 1928 by the Geographical Names Board of Canada.

The first ascent of the peak was made in 1936 by L. Gest, Mr. and Mrs. H. Kingman, H.S. Kingman Jr., W. Kingman, with Christian Hasler Jr. as guide.

== Geology ==
Like other mountains in Banff Park, the mountain is composed of sedimentary rock laid down during the Precambrian to Jurassic periods. Formed in shallow seas, this sedimentary rock was pushed east and over the top of younger rock during the Laramide orogeny.

== Climate ==
Based on the Köppen climate classification, Mount Weed is located in a subarctic climate zone with cold, snowy winters, and mild summers. Temperatures can drop below -20 °C with wind chill factors below -30 °C. Precipitation runoff from Mount Weed drains into the Mistaya River, a tributary of the North Saskatchewan River.

== Gallery ==
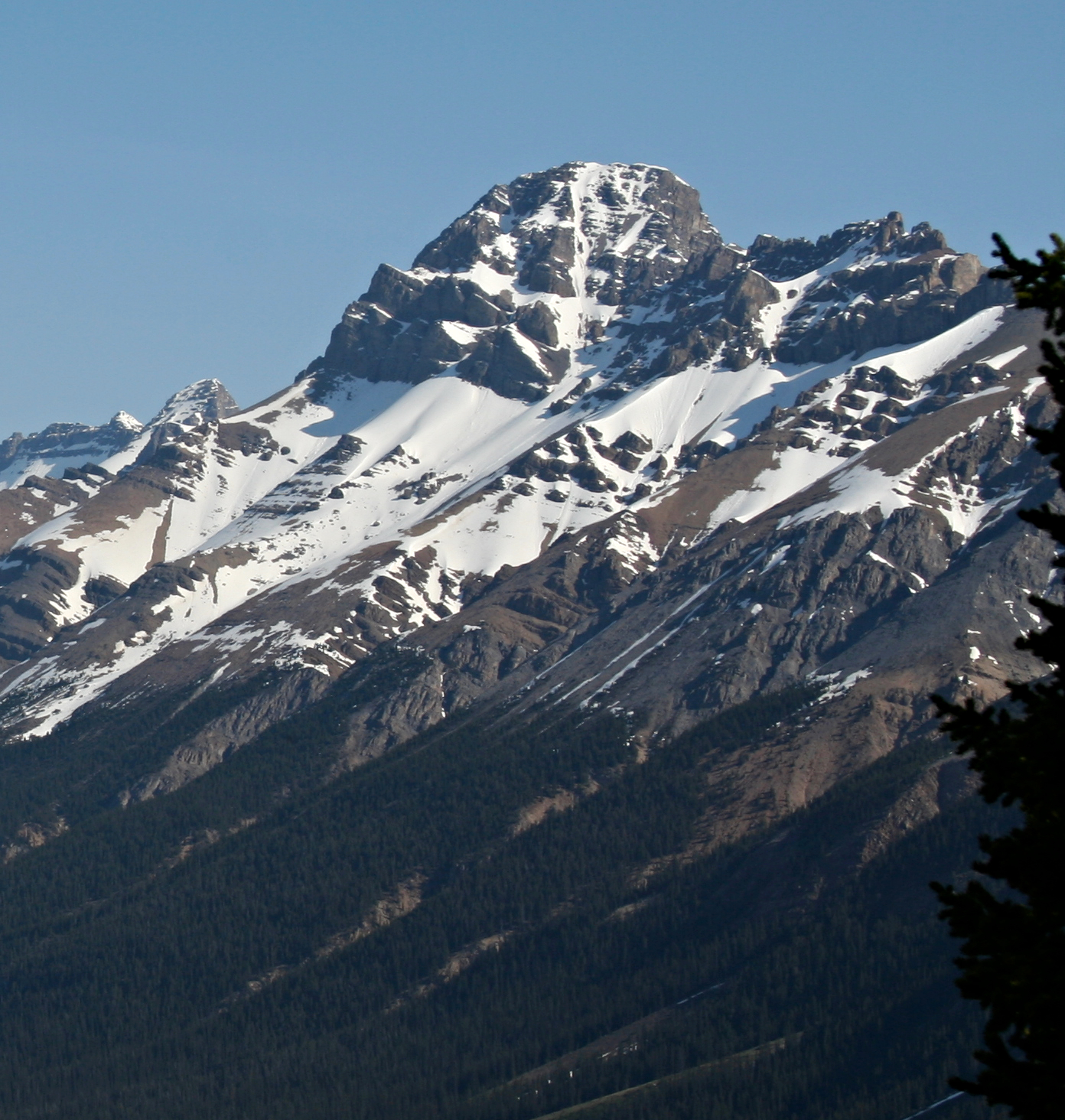
Mount Weed seen from Peyto Lake Overlook

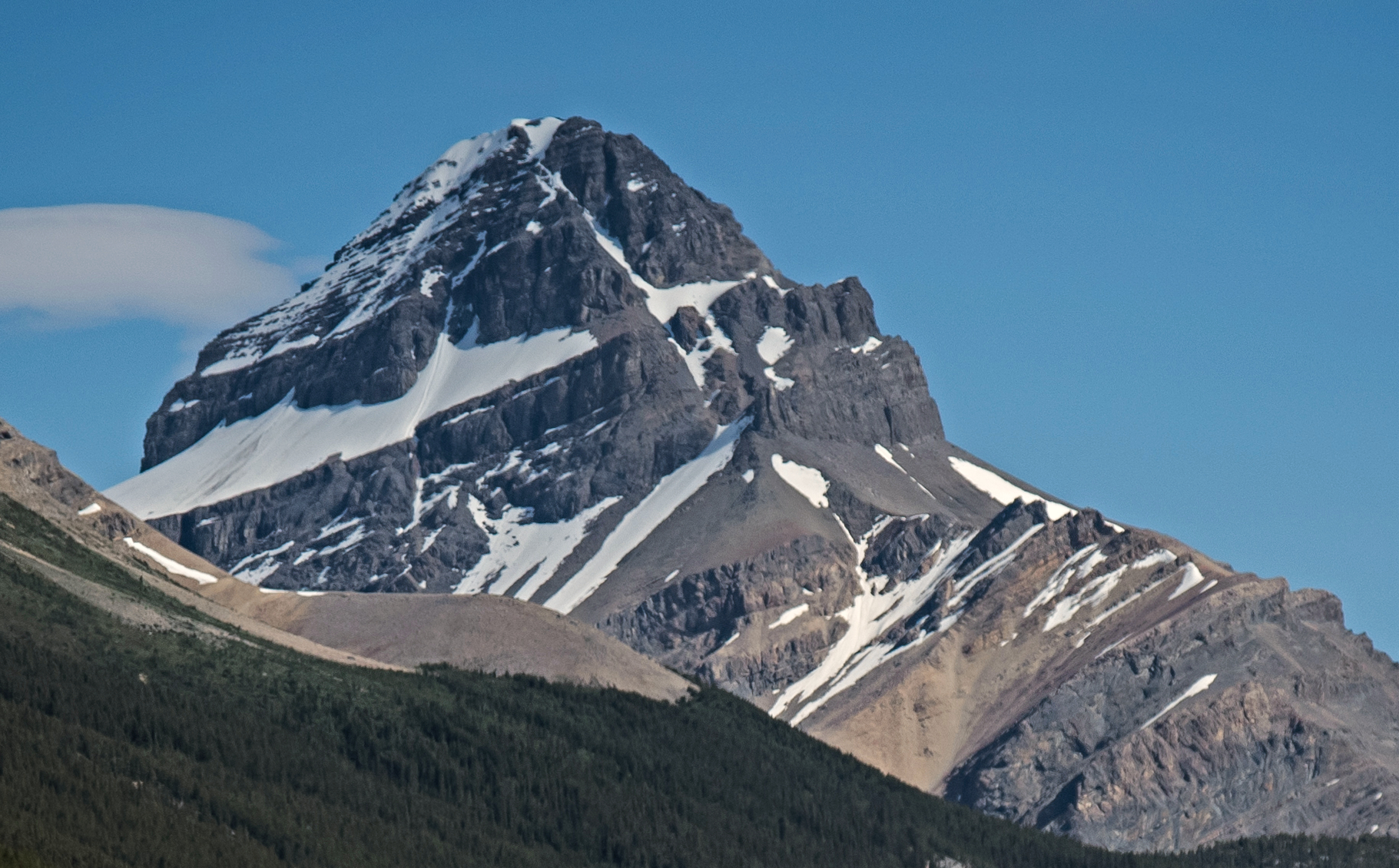
Mount Weed

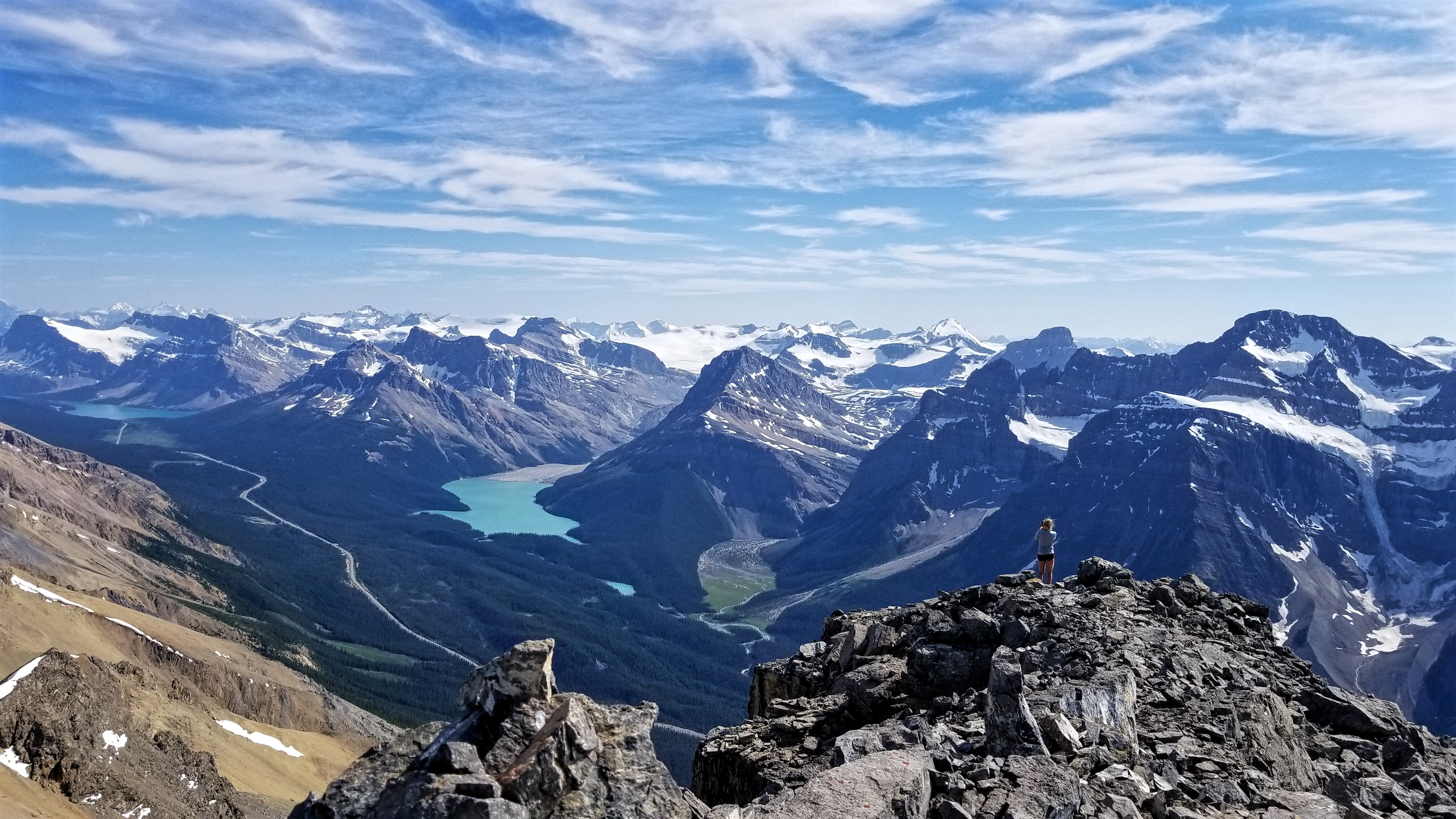
View from the summit of Mount Weed

== See also ==
- List of mountains in the Canadian Rockies
- Geography of Alberta
