= Mount Patterson =

Mountain in Banff NP, Alberta, Canada

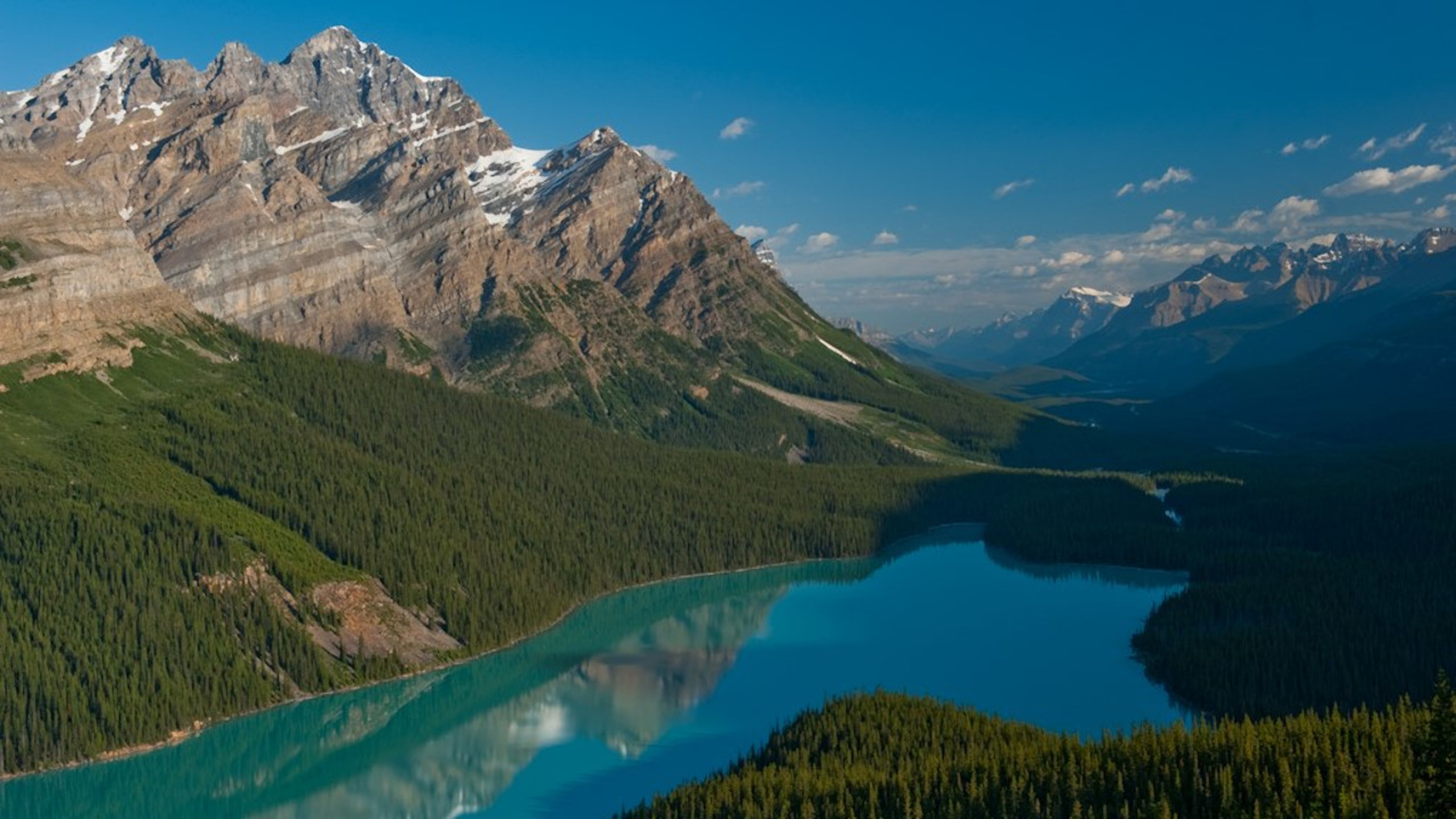
- Mount Patterson reflected in Peyto Lake

Highest point
- Elevation: 3,197 m (10,489 ft)
- Prominence: 810 m (2,660 ft)
- Parent peak: Mount Balfour
- Listing: Mountains of Alberta
- Coordinates: 51°44′52″N 116°34′27″W

Geography
- Location within Alberta
- Interactive map of Mount Patterson
- Location: Alberta, Canada
- Parent range: Waputik Range
- Topo map: NTS 82N10 Blaeberry River

Climbing
- First ascent: 1924 by F.V. Field and his brother W.O. Field guided by Edward Feuz Jr.
- Easiest route: The Snowbird Glacier and East Face IV 5.6

Mount Patterson is a peak in the Waputik Range of the Canadian Rockies. It is located within Banff National Park in Alberta of Western Canada. Mount Patterson stands across the Mistaya River Valley from Mount Weed, and both are prominent features seen from the Icefields Parkway. Its nearest higher peak is Howse Peak, 10.14 km (6.30 mi) to the northwest.

It was named in 1917 after John Duncan Patterson who was president of the Alpine Club of Canada from 1914 to 1920.

== Geology ==
Like other mountains in Banff Park, Mount Patterson is composed of sedimentary rock laid down during the Precambrian to Jurassic periods. Formed in shallow seas, this sedimentary rock was pushed east and over the top of younger rock during the Laramide orogeny.

== Climate ==
Based on the Köppen climate classification, Mount Patterson is located in a subarctic climate zone with cold, snowy winters, and mild summers. Winter temperatures can drop below −20 °C (−4 °F) with wind chill factors below −30 °C (−22 °F). Precipitation runoff from Mount Patterson drains into the Mistaya River which is a tributary of the Saskatchewan River.

== Gallery ==
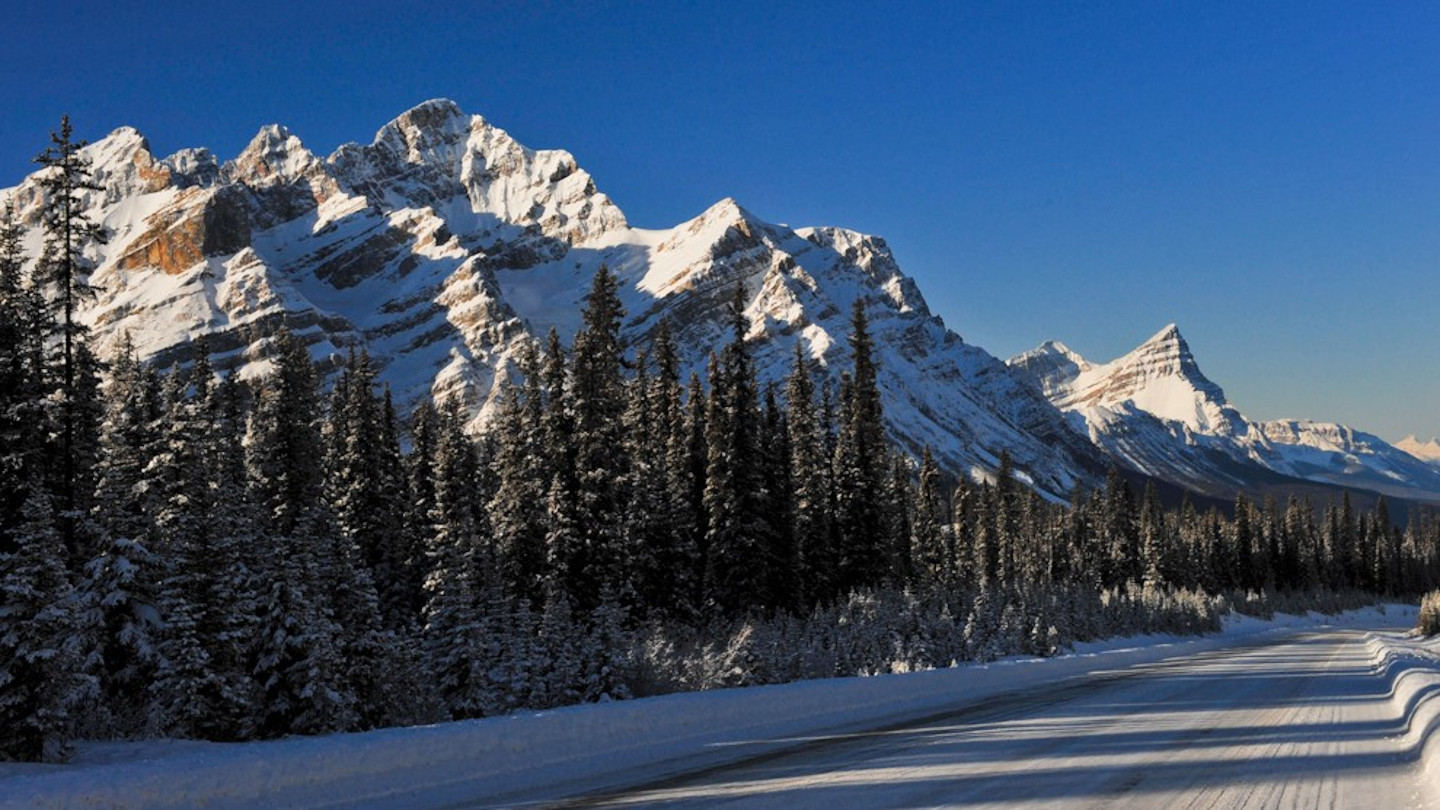
Mt. Patterson (left) from the Icefields Parkway

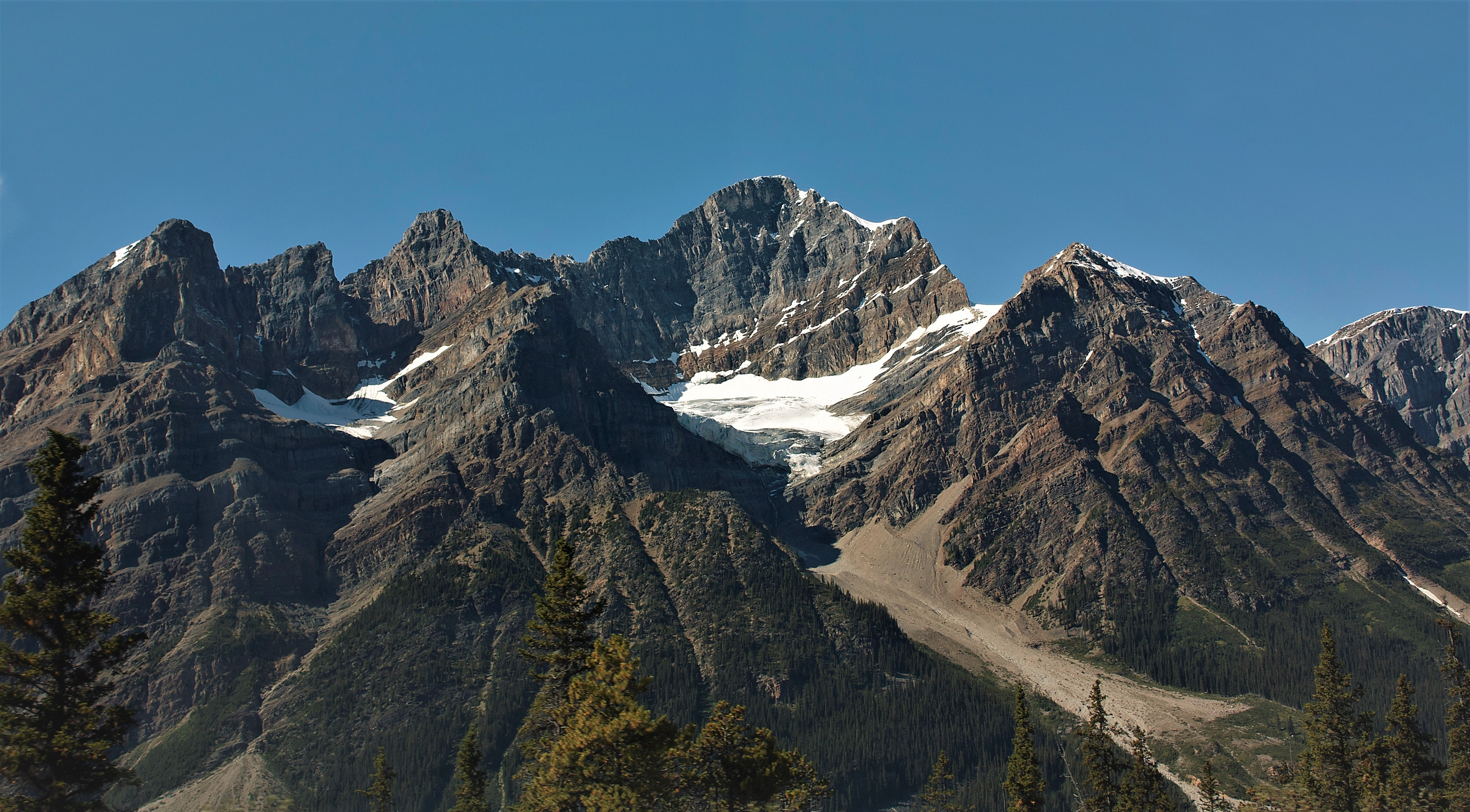
East aspect, from Icefields Parkway

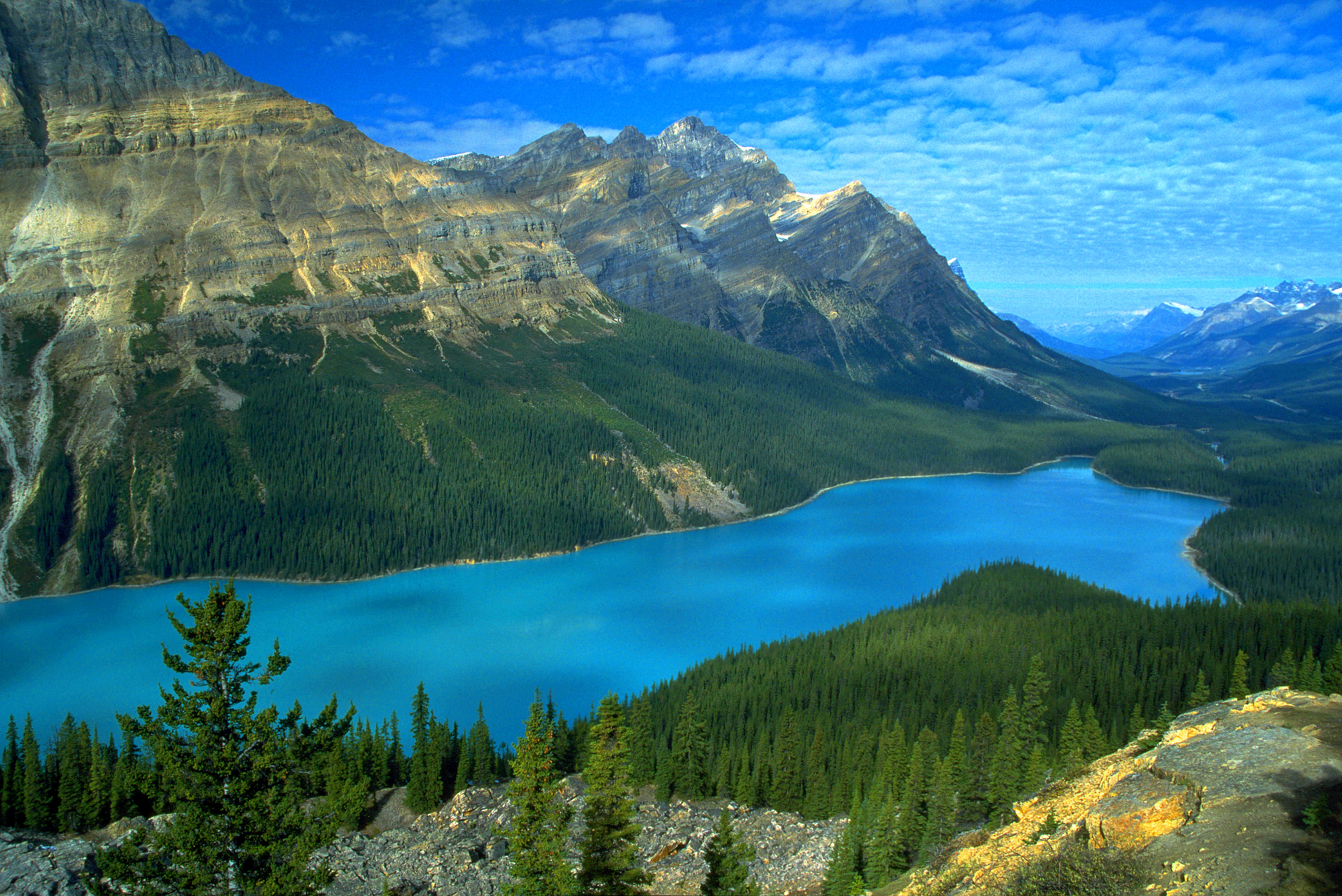
Mt. Patterson centered

== See also ==
- List of mountains of Canada
