= Woodbridge (surname) =

Woodbridge is a surname. Notable people with the surname include:

- Benjamin Woodbridge (1622–1684), English clergyman and controversialist
- Benjamin H. Woodbridge (1935–2015), American politician from Virginia
- Benjamin Ruggles Woodbridge (1739–1819), doctor, legislator and colonel of the Massachusetts militia during the American Revolutionary War
- Charles Woodbridge (1902–1980), American Presbyterian missionary
- Edward Woodbridge (1794–1863), English amateur cricketer
- Frederick Woodbridge (disambiguation)
- George Woodbridge (actor) (1907–1973), British actor
- George Woodbridge (illustrator) (1930–2004), American illustrator
- John Woodbridge V (1582–1637), English clergyman
- John Woodbridge VI (1613–1696), English nonconformist who emigrated to New England
- Jonathan Edwards Woodbridge (1844-1935), American shipbuilder and naval architect
- Margaret Woodbridge (1902–1995), American competition swimmer
- Mary A. Brayton Woodbridge (1830 – 1894), American temperance reformer and editor
- Nick Woodbridge (born 1986), British modern pentathlete
- Samuel Merrill Woodbridge (1819–1905), American clergyman, theologian, author and college professor
- Stan Woodbridge (1921–1945), Royal Air Force sergeant, George Cross recipient
- Timothy Woodbridge (1709–1774), American missionary, deacon and schoolteacher, later a judge, representative, and Superintendent of Indian Affairs
- Todd Woodbridge (born 1971), Australian tennis player
- Valerie Woodbridge, Australian Paralympic athlete
- William Woodbridge (1780–1861), U.S. statesman
- William Channing Woodbridge (1794–1845), American geographer

== See also ==
- Baron Woodbridge
