= Robert Parker (minister) =

English Puritan clergyman and scholar

Robert Parker (c. 1564 – 1614) was an English Puritan clergyman and scholar. He became minister of a separatist congregation in Holland where he died while in exile for his heterodoxy. The Revd. Cotton Mather wrote of Parker as "one of the greatest scholars in the English Nation, and in some sort the father of all Nonconformists of our day."

== Early life: England ==
Parker was educated at Magdalen College, Oxford, where he became a chorister in 1575. He was a demy there 1580–3, and graduated B.A. on 3 November 1582. He was elected Fellow in 1585, and proceeded M.A. 22 June 1587. In the following year he was more than once reprimanded for not wearing scholastic gown or surplice. In October 1591, during a vacancy in the diocese, he was presented by Henry Herbert, 2nd Earl of Pembroke to the Rectory of Patney, Wiltshire, by authority of Archbishop Whitgift, and in January 1592 was instituted by Bishop Coldwell with the Bishop of Winchester as patron. In 1593 he resigned his college fellowship and his position at Patney, and the next year was instituted as Rector of Stanton St. Bernard, Wiltshire, in the patronage of the Crown. At this time he married Dorothy Stevens: their daughter Sarah was born in 1593, and their son Thomas Parker c.1595. When his wife's sister Ann married, he became brother (in-law) of William Noyes, minister of Cholderton, Wiltshire.

He held the Rectory of Stanton until 1607, and in 1605 he presented his wife's brother Richard Stevens as Perpetual Vicar to the same parish. Stevens's son Nathaniel, who became a noted religious controversialist, was born there in 1606/7. In 1607 Parker issued a discourse against idolatrous uses of the sign of the Cross during religious ceremonies. This work, much admired by some, amounted to an open declaration of nonconformism, and caused the bishops to induce King James to issue a proclamation offering a reward for his capture. To avoid prosecution before the Court of High Commission he went into hiding in London. After some narrow escapes he made his way to Gravesend and thence into exile in the Netherlands.

== Leyden, Netherlands ==
Leaving his son to schooling by William Noyes at Cholderton, Parker settled in Leyden, and for four years worked on the treatise De Descensu Christi, published in Amsterdam in 1611. Thomas Bilson, Bishop of Winchester, had preached at Paul's Cross in 1597 on the subject of Christ's descent into Hell, an article of the Apostles' Creed. Henry Jacob published an answer, and at Elizabeth's command Bilson prepared his magnum opus in reply (1604). Bilson's doctrine was answered at home by Gabriel Powell, and abroad by Hugh Broughton. Parker's De Descensu was begun by Hugh Sanford, who died in 1607 leaving it incomplete: Parker, according to his own preface, rearranged the whole matter and completed it. He derives Hades from Adam, and traces the whole Greek theogony to Hebrew roots and derivations.

Henry Jacob arrived in Leyden in 1610 and, with support from wealthy English merchants, William Ames was brought together with them to 'engage in controversy with supporters of the English Church'. Parker's role in, and influence upon the separatist question in Congregationalism was the subject of differing opinions in his own time and afterwards. He is said to have been largely in agreement with Jacob, taking a moderate or 'semi-separatist' line. At Leyden, in their friendship and dealings with the pastor John Robinson, Parker and Ames were thought to have softened Robinson's more strongly separatist views. William Bradford placed Ames and Parker in the tradition of Thomas Cartwright. Richard Clyfton, however, attacked Parker as being identified with the Brownist Christopher Lawne.

== Amsterdam ==
In around 1611 Parker and Jacob moved to Amsterdam, and came into the congregation of the English Reformed Church there. Parker lived in the household of the chief presbyterian minister John Paget, with whom he had daily conversations. Paget recorded that on his arrival, Parker maintained that Church synods had only an advisory validity, but that he adapted to and participated in the presbyterian discipline. He became an elder of the congregation, 'and by office sat with us daily to judge and hear the causes of our church, and so became a member of our classical combination.' He became also the secretary of the consistory meetings, recording their proceedings in his own hand.

Jacob criticized Paget for drawing Parker away from his principles. After two years he was to have been chosen minister in Amsterdam, but the Burgomasters, not wishing to lose the favour of King James I, forbade his appointment. Therefore, he was forced to give it up and to leave Amsterdam. William Best and John Davenport, in 1634–35, wrote against Paget, accusing him of tyranny in depriving the Amsterdam church of freedom to appoint its own pastors, and of jealousy towards Parker, who could preach in Dutch. Paget answered in his own defence and in In Defence of Church Government (1641) gave detailed reference to Parker's incomplete work, De Politeia Ecclesiastica Christi et Hierarchica Opposita, (first published posthumously in Frankfurt in 1616), which Paget claimed to be a representation of presbyterian church organization.

Parker left Amsterdam in 1613 for Doesburg, Gelderland, where he preached to the garrison. There were various accusations against him arising from his book De Descensu ad Inferos, and he wrote several times to Paget as his friend asking him to help to clear him of false imputations, and thanking him for his efforts. He evidently hoped to return to Amsterdam, but never did so: he died at Doesburg in 1614 after having been there about 8 months.

== Family ==
The parents of Robert Parker are not known.

Parker was brother-in-law of the clergyman William Noyes, but it is debated whether Noyes's wife (Anne) was the sister of Robert Parker himself (as her grandson Nicholas Noyes of Salem later stated), or of Parker's wife Dorothy Stevens. It has been claimed that Dorothy and her brother the Revd. Richard Stevens (and possibly Anne) were children of Nicholas Stephens (died 1611) and his wife Frances Brydges, daughter of Sir Richard Brydges, of Burderop Park, Chiseldon, Wiltshire. However their names do not appear as children of Nicholas Stephens in his will or pedigree.

Robert Parker and Dorothy Stevens had three children:

- Revd. Thomas Parker (1595–1677), along with his cousin Revd. James Noyes, led a group of Wiltshire settlers aboard the Mary and John to New England in 1630 where they founded Newbury, Massachusetts.
- Sarah (1593–1663) married John Woodbridge V (1582–1678), rector of Stanton Fitzwarren, Wiltshire, and was mother of John Woodbridge and Benjamin Woodbridge.
- Elizabeth Parker (flourished 1614–1653) published under her married name Elizabeth Avery and was a Fifth Monarchist, in the Dublin congregation of John Rogers in 1653.

Dorothy Parker, née Stevens, of Mildenhall, Wiltshire, wife of Robert Parker, died c.1650. Revd. Richard Stevens, brother of Dorothy, of Stanton St Bernard, died c.1661. Anne Noyes, née Parker (or Stevens?), wife of William Noyes, of Cholderton, died c.1658.

== Works ==
- A scholasticall Discourse against symbolising with Antichrist in ceremonies, especially in the Signe of the Crosse (Richard Schilders, Middelburg 1607).
- De Descensu Domini nostri Jesu Christi ad inferos libri quatuor ab auctore doctissimo Hugone Sanfordo Coomflorio Anglo inchoati, opera vero et studio Roberti Parker ad umbilicum perducti ac jam tandem in lucem editi (by Hugh Sanford and Robert Parker), (Aegidius Thorpe, Amsterdam 1611).
- De politeia ecclesiastica Christi et hierarchica opposita libri tres, in quibus tam verse disciplinae fundamenta quam omnes fere de eadem controversiae summo cum judicio et doctrina methodice pertractantur (Godefrid Basson, Frankfort 1616). Incomplete, published posthumously.
- An exposition of the powring out of the fourth vial mentioned in the sixteenth of the Revelation by Master Robert Parker; wherein he differs from M. Brightman, and other Protestant divines, which hold that these judgements are to be poured out upon the Church of Rome, and that party, but he conceives they have reference unto these times, and are to be poured out upon some Protestant princes and churches (Thomas Pierrepont, London 1650). (Thomas Gataker). Published posthumously.
- The mystery of the vialls opened: being a short exposition upon the pouring out of the four last vialls, mentioned in the 16 chapter of the Revelation: wherein divers things relating to times present, past, and to come, are discovered: as the ruine of Antichrist, and the severall degrees thereunto; and the shadowing out these times wherein we live, are generally surveyed (John Sweeting, London 1651). Published posthumously.
