= Benjamin Woodbridge =

English clergyman and controversialist

Benjamin Woodbridge (1622–1684) was an English clergyman, writer and controversialist, and was Harvard College's first-ever valedictorian.

== Life ==
Woodbridge was the son of John Woodbridge V (1582–1637), rector of Stanton Fitzwarren, Wiltshire, and his wife Sarah (1593–1663), daughter of Robert Parker. He matriculated at Magdalen Hall, Oxford, on 9 November 1638, but in 1639 went to New England, where his elder brother, John Woodbridge, had migrated in 1634 with their uncle Thomas Parker and cousin James Noyes.

Benjamin was the first graduate of Harvard College, commencing B.A. in 1642. Returning to England, he was able to graduate MA at Oxford on 10 November 1648, a degree awarded then as now by seniority and not by examination. At that time, Woodbridge had already been doing duty as a minister in Salisbury, and on 18 May had been appointed rector of Newbury, Berkshire, where he had success with presbyterians. In 1652 he attempted to refute two ministers of Salisbury, Thomas Warren and William Eyre, in a sermon on Justification by Faith, which was published and commended by Richard Baxter. Eyre responded, Baxter upheld his own and Woodbridge's views and Woodbridge himself issued a reply.

Woodbridge was one of the assistants for the ejection of scandalous ministers in 1654. In 1657 the trustees for the maintenance of ministers granted an assistant for him at Newbury. At the Restoration he was made one of the king's chaplains and had the canonry of Windsor offered him, but he hesitated and it was given to another. He was one of the commissioners at the Savoy Conference in 1661, but was silenced by the Act of Uniformity 1662. Subsequently he preached in private in Newbury, but was frequently disturbed and imprisoned. Eventually he consented to conform and take holy orders from John Earle, bishop of Salisbury, at Oxford in October 1665. But regretting his inconsistency he returned to his quiet preaching in Newbury until the indulgence of March 1675 enabled him to act with fuller publicity.

On the allegations of the Popish Plot in 1678 he was encouraged to greater efforts, and preached a place of worship every Sunday at Highclere in Hampshire. In 1683 he retired to Englefield in Berkshire, where he died 1 November 1684, and was buried in Newbury on the 4th.

== Works ==
Woodbridge published in 1648, under the pseudonym "Filodexter Transilvanus", Church Members set in Joynt, or a Discovery of the Unwarrantable and Disorderly Practice of Private Christians, in usurping the Peculiar Office and Work of Christ's own Pastours, namely Publick Preaching. The book was written in reply to a treatise entitled Preaching without Ordination, published the previous year by Edmund Chillenden. Woodbridge's book was republished in 1656 and in 1657. He also published in London a work by James Noyes (who had married his mother's sister), entitled Moses and Aaron; or the Rights of the Church and State. Woodbridge wrote some verses, inscribed on the tomb of John Cotton of Boston, Massachusetts (d. 1652), which possibly gave Benjamin Franklin a hint for his epitaph upon himself, based on comparison with a book and a new edition. Woodbridge, in words Franklin could have seen in Cotton Mather's Magnalia Christi Americana, wrote that Cotton was:

A Living Breathing Bible; Tables where
Both Covenants, at Large, engraven were;
Gospel and Law, in's Heart, had Each its Column;
His Head an Index to the Sacred Volume;
His very Name a Title-Page; and next,
His Life a Commentary on the Text.
O, What a Monument of Glorious Worth,
When, in a New Edition, he comes forth,
Without Errata’s, may we think he'l be
In Leaves and Covers of Eternity!
