= William Noyes (priest) =

16/17th-century Anglican clergyman

William Noyes (1568–1622), Rector of Cholderton, Wiltshire, was an Anglican clergyman of Puritan teachings. Under the influence of his instruction, members of his family succeeded him in Puritan ministry both in England and in Massachusetts Bay Colony, at first in Newbury, Essex County, where two of his sons, James and Nicholas, and his nephew Thomas Parker, were prominent figures. His grandson, Nicholas Noyes, was closely involved in the Salem witch trials. The religious motivations which led them to New England also gave rise to an extensive American branch of the Noyes family, of which William Noyes is the direct progenitor.

== Origins and early life ==
William Noyes was the son of Robert Noyes (1524–1614) and Joan Attridge (1527–1618) of Urchfont, Wiltshire. The Noyes family were already established in various branches in Wiltshire during the 16th century. William Noyes of Urchfont, yeoman (d. 1557) purchased the prebend of Urchfont in 1540 from the Earl of Hertford, afterwards Protector Somerset. His son Richard Noyes of Manningford Bruce mentions "the sons of Robert Noyes of Cholderton" in his will of 1590. This may refer to Robert the father of William and his brothers Richard Noyes, of Cholderton, yeoman, who married Sara and died in 1639, and Robert Noyes, yeoman, born 1570, who died 20 January 1659 and was buried at Cholderton. The Noyes families of Urchfont and Cholderton were of the same stock, but there were various Noyes households.

In November 1588, William matriculated from University College in the University of Oxford, and gained his B.A. in May 1592. He was ordained deacon in September 1593 and priest in December of the same year by John Coldwell at Salisbury Cathedral.

Around 1595, he married and his three elder sons were born to him by around 1600. His wife, Anne, was, according to their grandson, Nicholas Noyes of Salem, the sister of Robert Parker, M.A. (graduate of Magdalen College, Oxford) with whom William Noyes was closely associated. However this is inconclusive (since 'sister' may refer to sisters by birth or by marriage), and it has been argued alternatively that she was sister of Parker's wife, Dorothy Stevens, who was certainly the sister of Revd. Richard Stevens of Stanton St Bernard, Wiltshire. It has further been speculated that they were daughters of Nicholas Stephens (d. 1611) and his wife, Frances Brydges, daughter of Sir Richard Brydges, of Burderop Park, Chiseldon, Wiltshire. Neither Dorothy and Richard Stevens, nor Anne Stevens, appear as children of Nicholas in his will (P.C.C. 1611) nor among other records of the family. The claim therefore lacks positive verification. Robert Parker and his wife had one son, Thomas Parker, who was the nephew of William Noyes.

In 1598, Noyes appears as 'minister of this place' at Leigh, Essex, in the household of Richard Rich (illegitimate son of Richard Rich, 1st Baron Rich), when he witnessed Rich's nuncupative will in the presence of his daughter Margaret Rich. Around 1605, she became sister-in-law to Sir William Calley by marriage to Paul Bowdler. Calley, of a family long associated with Burderop, purchased the Manor in 1619. Around 1614, Margaret remarried, to Sir Thomas Wroth of Petherton Park, Somerset.

== Rector of Cholderton ==
Noyes was instituted Rector of Cholderton in the episcopacy of Henry Cotton in May 1602. Patronage was in John Thornborough (a bishop sympathetic to Puritan teaching) in 1567, and advowson being granted to Robert Noyes (yeoman), Giles Hutchens of Salisbury (sometime Mayor and M.P. for that city) was assigned as William's lay patron. In July of the following year the appointment was renewed under the patronage of George Kingsmill, Justiciar in the King's Bench, Westminster. Noyes held the living until shortly before his death. In 1604 Parker presented Richard Stevens, his brother-in-law, as Perpetual Vicar of Stanton St. Bernard (which he held until 1659), and in 1607 was obliged to flee religious persecution to the Netherlands, where he remained until his death in 1614.

Noyes became the schoolmaster of his nephew Thomas Parker. The Revd. Cotton Mather, pastor of the North Church in Boston, gave an insight into his character in describing Parker's early education: "This Mr. Thomas Parker was the only son of his father, who being very desirous to have him a scholar, committed him unto perhaps a godly, but a very severe master. Under this hard master, though he was well nigh discouraged by the Dulness which he apprehended in his own capacity, yet the consideration of his father's desire made him, with an early piety, to join his prayers unto his pains, that he might have his education prospered; and God so prospered him, that he arrived unto a desirable degree of knowledge, both in the Tongues and in the Arts."

William Noyes's grandson, the Revd. Nicholas Noyes of Salem, Massachusetts, gave Mather a valuable narrative of his uncle James Noyes (b. 1608), in which he explained that his grandfather was "a very learned man". William's children no doubt also received instruction from their father. It was said by Nicholas Noyes that after William Noyes's death Thomas Parker tutored James and engaged him as assistant teacher in the Free School at Newbury, Berkshire, where they taught together. There it was, perhaps, that with the help of Dr. William Twisse of Newbury (the eminent Supralapsarian), Parker converted James Noyes to his ministry. James's elder brother Nathan, who was to succeed their father as Rector at Cholderton, matriculated from Lincoln College, Oxford in May 1615, aged 17, and obtained his B.A. little more than a year later in October 1616. He was ordained deacon at Marsh Baldon near Oxford in March 1617.

The Parish Register for William Noyes's time as Rector was presumably lost or destroyed by 1651, when, after the death of Nathan, his successor Samuel Heskins began a new book and supplied the confused record: "Mr. William Noyes Rector of Choldington about 30 years departed this life anno 1616. Mr. Nathan Noyes succeeded his father in the Rectorie of Choldrington and departed this life in ye year 1651." Diocesan records show that a Faculty Office dispensation was granted to Nathan to hold the Rectory in his father's place on 4 February 1622: William Noyes resigned the Rectory the next day, and Nathan was appointed Rector immediately with the Privy Counsellor Edward, Lord Zouche, Lord Warden of the Cinque Ports and a Commissioner of the Virginia Company, as his patron.

William Noyes died intestate before 30 April following, when an inventory of his estate was made. Anne, his widow, entered into a bond of administration dated 28 May jointly with Cuthbert Parker, yeoman, of Whitchbury, Hampshire, both signing in well-trained hands and both using heraldic seals. She lived to the age of 82, long enough for her burial at Cholderton to be recorded in Samuel Heskins' register on 7 March 1657. Her will, made on 18 March 1655/56, refers to her two sons James and Nicholas in New England and left to them and 'to such children as they have living' 12 pence apiece, by which disinheritance she prevented them from challenging her other legacies.

The old church of Cholderton was pulled down in 1840.

== Family ==
The children of Rev William Noyes and his wife Anne Parker are known as follows:

- Ephraim Noyes, born c. 1596, Cholderton, died date unknown. He married Parnell Brewer 5 November 1633 in Orcheston St Mary, Wiltshire, England. She was born c. 1613 in Wiltshire, England.
- Rev. Nathan Noyes, born 15 May 1597, Cholderton, died before 6 September 1651 in Sarum, Wiltshire, England. He married Mary Parker c. 1620 in Cholderton. She was born c. 1600 in Wiltshire, and died after 6 September 1651 (in Sarum, Wiltshire, possibly), when she was mentioned in her husband's will.
- John Noyes, born c. 1600, Cholderton, died 1659 in Newton, Wiltshire, England. He married Elizabeth Bulpit 3 February 1640/41 in Faccombe, Hampshire, England.
- (Daughter) Noyes, born c. 1604, died 1655. She married Robert Read c. 1624 in Wiltshire, England.
- Sarah Noyes, born c. 1605, died unknown.
- Rev. James Noyes, born 22 October 1608, Cholderton, died 22 October 1656, Newbury, Essex, Massachusetts. With his cousin Rev. Thomas Parker he led a group of 100 Wiltshire settlers aboard the Mary and John to New England and founded Newbury, Massachusetts. Before migrating to New England, he married Miss Sara Brown in March 1633/34 in Cholderton, eldest daughter of Mr. Joseph and Mrs. Sarah Brown of Southampton. She was born 1610 in Southampton, Hampshire, England, and died 13 September 1691 in Newbury Old Town, Essex, Massachusetts.
- Mowit Noyes, born 1613 in Cholderton, died 6 October 1671. She married Thomas Kent 23 September 1631 in Over Wallop, Hampshire, England.
- Deacon Nicholas Noyes, born 1614, Cholderton, died 23 November 1701, Newbury, Essex, Massachusetts. He was Deacon of Newbury church, and served four terms as deputy to the general court. In 1640 he married Mary Cutting in Newbury Old Town, Essex, Massachusetts, daughter of John and Mary Cutting. She was born c. 1619, and died after 23 June 1665. With his older brother James and cousin Rev. Thomas Parker, Nicholas led a group of Wiltshire settlers aboard the Mary & John to New England to found Newbury, Massachusetts. Nicholas was father of Nicholas Noyes who fed the flames during the trials.
- Anne Noyes, born 16 December 1617, Cholderton, died before 1711.

== Notes ==
The correction was published in 1906 as follows:

- 8861. 2. Noyes. R.W. N., 22 Oct 1906. The "Additional Corrections and Additions," page 3, of Wheeler's "History of Stonington, Conn." has the following: "Miss Harriet E. Noyes of New Hampshire says: 'From recent investigations in England the name of Rev. William Noyes's wife was proven to be Anne Stephens, daughter of Nicholas Stephens of Burdrop Manor, and sister of Dorothy Stephens, mother of Rev. Thomas Parker.'" M. G. F.

The primary source for this statement, if there was one, awaits identification.

== Other sources ==
- G. Boyd-Roberts (ed), Massachusetts and Maine Families in the Ancestry of Walter Goodwin Davis (1885-1966): a reprinting, 3 Vols (Genealogical Publishing Co. 1996), III: Neal-Wright, p. 54.
- P.C. Reed & D.C. Smith, 'The English Ancestry of Peter Noyes,' New England Historical and Genealogical Society Vol. 152 Part 3 (July 1998), p. 271.
- W.C. Metcalfe (ed.), 'Stephens of Burdropp' and 'Stephens of Cheseldon', in The Visitation of Wiltshire 1565 by William Harvey (London 1897), p. 45.
- L.W. Noyes and F.A. Noyes-Giffen, Descendants of the Reverend William Noyes (L.W. Noyes, Chicago, Ill. 1900)
- C.P. Noyes, Noyes-Gilman Ancestry, being a series of Sketches, with a Chart of the Ancestors, of Charles Phelps Noyes, and Emily H. (Gilman) Noyes, his Wife (Author, St. Paul, Minn. 1907), at p. 5.
- C. Reynolds, Hudson-Mohawk Genealogical and Family Memoirs, Vol. I (Lewis Historical Publishing Company, New York 1911), p. 335 ff.
- [S23] Register-4 Gen Noyes English Ancestry, p. 118.
- [S23] Register-4 Gen Noyes English Ancestry, p. 116.
- [S44] Book-Colonial Families, p. 389.
- [S8] CD-Family Archives No. 17.
