= Timothy Woodbridge =

American politician

- Born: 27 February 1709; Springfield, Massachusetts, U.S.
- Died: 10 May 1774 (aged 65); Stockbridge, Massachusetts
- Occupations: Missionary, Judge, Legislator, Superintendent of Indian Affairs
- Spouse: Abigail Day

Timothy Woodbridge (February 27, 1709 – May 10, 1774) was an American missionary, deacon and schoolteacher, later a judge, representative, and Superintendent of Indian Affairs, from Springfield, Massachusetts, who spent most of his adult life in Stockbridge, Massachusetts, teaching the Mahicans and other Native Americans to read and write, English customs and the Christian religion. About him, Jonathan Edwards said, "By his long-proved justice and integrity, he has gained a vast esteem with the Indians". Reverend John Sergeant described his efforts in this way: "Mr. Woodbridge ... has a very numerous school and a tedious task of it; lives a very lonesome life; is indeed indefatigable in his business; and no body deserves more of the publick than he." Gideon Hawley called him "a man of abilities... always poor, and had a powerful party against him; but he rose to be the first man in the county." Timothy worked very closely with all three men. He was instrumental in the purchase of large tracts of land in western New England from the Native Americans, such as modern-day Lenox and Alford, Massachusetts, by parlaying this reputation and experience.

== Early life ==
Timothy Woodbridge was born on February 27, 1709, to Reverend John Woodbridge VIII and Jemima Eliot. His father, the first minister of West Springfield, Massachusetts, was the eighth generation of ministers by the name John Woodbridge, including John Woodbridge V and John Woodbridge VI, and his brother was the ninth. His mother was the granddaughter of John Eliot, the "Apostle to the Indians". His brother Benjamin was also a minister, and the town of Woodbridge, Connecticut, is named in his honor. Timothy's father died young, when a tree fell on him in 1718. John left Timothy one fifth of his land in the town of Wethersfield, Connecticut, in his will.

== Missionary life ==
=== Early years ===
John Sergeant had arranged to return to Yale to complete his duties as a tutor, so the ministers associated with the mission sought Timothy out as an ideal candidate, due to his education, family history, and possibly, knowledge of their language. Sergeant himself called Timothy "a young gentleman very well qualify'd for the business". At this time, there were about forty or fifty Mahicans settled at the mission, and little more than twenty children attended the school. Timothy arrived the last week of November, 1734, while Sergeant was away at Albany, meeting with the Mohawks, and the mission was left in his hands when Sergeant returned to New Haven on December 9. As schoolmaster, he taught reading and writing of English, cleanliness, English manners, and Christian morals. On January 19, 1735, a council with Mahican leadership was held, and they voiced their desire that Timothy would remain with them, and that John Sergeant would return to live among them.

However, not all of the Mahicans agreed that they should submit to the English lifestyle, and rumors circulated that there was resentment about Chief Konkapot and Umpachenee being given military commissions by Governor Jonathan Belcher, as well as the mission in general. Soon after the council, several of the locals, including Lieutenant Umpachenee's family, fell seriously ill, and they were convinced they had been poisoned by their discontented brethren. They asked that Timothy pray for them, and that they be given a Christian burial, if they should die, which two individuals did. A few weeks later, determined to discover the perpetrator, the spiritual leaders held a type of divination ceremony. When Timothy learned of this, he set out to observe the ceremony, arriving just in time. After the ceremony, he voiced his great displeasure of their "sinful" method of worship, and they agreed never to repeat the mistake.

In February, the Mahicans went into the woods to harvest maple syrup for their annual supply of sugar. Timothy took this opportunity to return to Springfield to visit friends and relatives, returning in early spring. Sergeant returned for a short time, and they took turns at the two Mahican settlements. When Sergeant returned to Yale again, he wrote Dr. Colman, one of the Commissioners of Indian Affairs at Boston, and requested that Timothy would be compensated so that he might continue there, being that there was enough work for two missionaries. Sergeant returned to stay in early July, and they resumed trading places on a weekly basis. In August, Timothy fell ill with a form of malaria. When he felt well enough to travel, he returned to Springfield, only to relapse, delaying his return until November. During the winter of 1736, Sergeant and Woodbridge decided to accompany the Mahicans on their maple syrup harvest, so that their education could continue, uninterrupted.

=== Indian Town ===
On March 25, the General Court granted a township on the Housatonic River, which would become Stockbridge, to the Mahicans, so that they could all live in one place, facilitating their education. Sergeant and Woodbridge each were to be granted 1/16th of the land, although Timothy lodged with Captain Konkapot that spring. At this time, the population increased to about ninety individuals.

The Woodbridges had built a house, the first permanent residence in the township, by January 1737, and John Sergeant lodged with them at this time, to live among his congregation. On May 7, the town, then known only as "Indian Town", was confirmed to the Mahicans, and funding was granted for a schoolhouse and meeting house to be constructed in August, with Timothy appointed to the supervising committee. In 1737, Timothy and Abigail served as witnesses to a land deal between Colonel John Stoddard and the Native Americans, comprising the modern town of Pittsfield. Timothy would be involved with many more purchases and land swaps in the coming years. During the winter of 1738-39, Sergeant and Woodbridge worked to create a passable road from New Glasgow, greatly increasing the accessibility of their town. Timothy was the senior deacon of the church, and identified as a New Light regarding the contemporary Great Awakening (he would later help recruit Jonathan Edwards, and become his greatest ally in Stockbridge).

=== Stockbridge formed ===
On June 22, 1739, the town of Stockbridge was incorporated, and the Rev. Arthur Lawrence, a Stockbridge historian, found it very probable that Timothy was responsible for the name, as the Woodbridges had come from a neighboring town of Stockbridge, Hampshire. Due to its new status, town officers had to be elected, and Timothy was chosen for town clerk. One of the conditions of the grant was that four new English families be allowed to settle there, and Timothy's brother Joseph, who became an important citizen, soon joined him. This same year, Timothy was involved in a land swap with the Indians, trading 280 acres of riverfront land in Stockbridge for some 4000 acres in what is now the city of Lenox, his part of which was 480 acres. In 1743, the Mahicans wrote to Governor Shirley, asking that lands be confirmed to Timothy and Ephraim Williams Jr., and the next year, Timothy sold some of his land granted by the General Court to Ephraim Sr.

1749 was a tumultuous year for Timothy and Stockbridge. The Mahicans had many complaints, including that Timothy had illegally purchased a tract of land without the consent of the entire tribe, so a committee was sent to investigate. Despite the fact that the sale was confirmed to be illegal, it was decided he should keep the land. John Sergeant's death in July left the town without a resident minister for over two years, and began a feud for control of the town between the Woodbridges and Williamses.

=== Interim ===
Timothy was again elected as town clerk in 1749, and effectively oversaw the mission during the search for a replacement minister. At this time his school had an enrollment of 55 students, and his salary was about 87 pounds for six months of teaching. In November and December, Timothy had several real estate dealings, including a bargain with Konkapot and Umpachene, a petition to Spencer Phips that lands be confirmed, in exchange for a loan he had made to the Mahicans in 1740, and a statement regarding lands he had been granted previously. In April 1750, Timothy and others made a request of Sir John Wentworth, 1st Baronet, governor of New Hampshire, for a grant of a township. In the winter of 1750-51, a number of Mohawks, including Chief Hendrick and Chief Nicholas, relocated to Stockbridge, increasing their population to about ninety.

=== Jonathan Edwards years ===
Despite the maneuvering of the Williams family, Jonathan Edwards became the successor to John Sergeant and became the resident minister on August 9, 1751. Timothy, as clerk, wrote up a land deed for Edwards the following April. A man named John Wauwaumpequunnaunt served as translator for Edwards, and also assisted Timothy in his school, and Edwards lobbied that he be compensated more generously.

==== Feud for control ====
Management of the boarding school was an ongoing source of contention in Stockbridge. Martin Kellogg had been leading the school, to which Edwards and Woodbridge objected. They requested that a new teacher be sent, and Gideon Hawley arrived in February 1752 to teach the Mohawks and Oneidas (the resident Mahicans were still taught at Woodbridge's school). However, Kellogg was supported by the Williamses and Joseph Dwight, and so refused to abandon his post, resulting in a battle for control. In April, Timothy and other supporters of Edwards met to encourage the few remaining students' families that they should remove their children from Kellogg's classes. In response, Dwight presented a report to the General Court, stating that Kellogg's methods had been working well, until Edwards and Woodbridge interfered, and tried to get Edwards removed as minister. A rare point of agreement between the two camps was that the ginseng craze was drawing many of the Mohawks away. Timothy had been elected to the General Court, and so was able to refute this testimony, as well as to inform Edwards of the proceedings. This feud continued through Edwards' stay in Stockbridge. In addition to being elected as a representative, Timothy, by then known to the Native Americans as Solohkuwauneh, was made a Justice of the Peace in 1752, at the recommendation of Edwards. Timothy later made a judge of both probate and of Common Pleas, in 1761. Unfortunately, his historic docket was later destroyed by a fire in 1846.

On January 3, 1753, Timothy was appointed as guardian of the Mohawk children at the boarding school. In February, the boarding school mysteriously burnt down, and Hawley lost everything. It was widely believed that the Williams/Dwight/Kellogg faction had set the fire, although this was never proven. As a result, it was decided that Hawley might be more successful if he lived among the Mohawks, instead of having them come to him. So, on May 22, 1753, Timothy and Gideon took a trip to Onaquaga, in Iroquois territory. The British were especially motivated to establish a relationship with the Six Nations as they foresaw the onset of the French and Indian War.

==== Rumors of an uprising ====
There was a near uprising in town when a man named Wampaumcorse, a Schaghticoke volunteer detective, was killed by white men after he approached them, regarding horses he believed they had stolen. The men were arrested, and one was found guilty of manslaughter, but this hardly satisfied the bereft family. Combined with harsh feelings resulting from the fallout of the Stockbridge feud, resentment increased to a fervor. Guns went missing and meetings with distant tribes were made. Some slaves revealed that they had been invited to partake in a massacre of the English. A town meeting was held, where it was made apparent that the conspirators were but a few, and the majority knew nothing of it, but the town remained on edge.

The General Court voted to compensate the family six pounds, but the payment was delayed such that Timothy and Joseph Dwight wrote to Governor Shirley, asking that the sum be increased and the payment made promptly, to avoid retaliation. On April 2, 1754, the court increased the payment to 20 pounds. This, too, was delayed, and Edwards wrote to expedite the payment, and it was finally made, which mostly quelled the potential uprising, but left some harsh feelings.

==== Susquehanna Company and The Albany Congress ====
Timothy was voted into the Susquehanna Company, a company interested in purchasing a large tract of land in the Wyoming Valley of modern Pennsylvania, on January 9, 1754, and granted a free share in the company. They hoped his reputation and experience with Native Americans would ensure successful negotiations, and he has appointed an agent of the company, to actually negotiate the deal with the sachems.

In an effort to strengthen their relationship with the Iroquois Nation, the British organized the Albany Congress from June 19 to July 11, which Timothy attended, working behind the scenes to secure the Susquehanna purchase for Connecticut. However, this purchase was disputed, and Chief Hendrick gave the same land to Pennsylvania, which resulted in an ongoing dispute for many years.

==== French and Indian War ====
The British had an ulterior motive for much of their interaction with the Iroquois nation, that of trying to win their affiliation against France, their frequent adversary in the quest to control the North American continent. In late summer of 1754, before they were officially at war, France was encouraging certain tribes, such as the Schaghticokes, Onahgungoes, and Orondocks, to take revenge on the British for the wrongs that had been committed against them, and several attacks and murders were committed. In October, Timothy Woodbridge met with some of the Canadian chiefs, to try to determine the reason for their unprovoked attacks, when the two parent nations were at peace (albeit very tenuously). The following year, Timothy was listed as a lieutenant on a muster roll of Stockbridge, under Joseph Dwight.

At about the same time, Jonathan Edwards fell ill, and Dwight redoubled his efforts to regain control of the boarding school (and the funding that came with it). Timothy led a delegation of Stockbridge natives to Boston to testify to their support of both Edwards and himself. Israel Williams used his growing influence with Governor Shirley, against them.

In fall of 1756, Timothy was again involved in a couple large land deals. In September, he was witness (as Justice of the Peace) to a deed of purchase of over 20,000 acres, including the modern town of Austerlitz, New York, from the Stockbridges. About a month later, he was part of the group which made the Shawenon Purchase, which encompassed most of modern Alford, Massachusetts.

In October 1757, Timothy wrote to Thomas Pownall, requesting legislation restricting the sale of alcohol to the Native Americans. Aaron Burr Sr., the president of Princeton University, died at a young age on September 24, 1757. Jonathan Edwards was sought out as a potential replacement, but left the decision up to a council of ministers. Timothy pleaded to the council that Edwards should remain in Stockbridge to no avail, and Edwards soon left for Princeton, and died shortly thereafter. Timothy was a witness to Edwards' will.

=== Later years ===
In November 1758, another petition was sent to Thomas Pownall, requesting that Timothy be allowed to purchase another 350 acres of the Stockbridges' land. During these times, church attendance was often mandatory at a certain frequency, and tythingmen were charged with making sure that the families under their watch were attending. If one failed to attend, they were given a choice of paying a fine or spending a day in the stocks. Such was the case with a group of Dutchmen in Great Barrington. Timothy advised them to go the stockade route rather than pay a fine, and even went as far as accompanying them to Sheffield, to ensure they weren't treated badly, as was usually the case with the stockades.

Berkshire County was incorporated in spring of 1761, and Timothy Woodbridge was selected as an associate judge for the Court of Common Pleas. The very first meeting of the court was held at his house in July. In January 1762, Timothy was the moderator for another meeting of the Susquehanna Company in Hartford, Connecticut, and was voted a member of the committee to prepare their case for King George III to confirm their purchase. In April, he wrote a letter to Governor Francis Bernard requesting help in apprehending the murderer of a Stockbridge man named Cheneaquun in Albany. In May, he was selected to a committee to "direct and inspect" the settlement of Susquehanna Company land. In June, the General Court granted 1500 pounds to Timothy, to be distributed to the Stockbridges, for giving up their rights to disputed lands. This was augmented by another 200 pounds the following February. Timothy later supplied the court with a detailed listing of the distribution of this money.

Timothy had again been elected to the legislature in 1762, but was not reelected the following year due to an election rigged by Elijah Williams. In November 1762, the Susquehanna Company voted him to be a part of a committee to meet with the Native American chiefs at Albany to discuss the purchase they had made, which was still disputed. This meeting was set for late March, and Elijah and his supporters took advantage of his absence. At this time, the number of English settlers had increased drastically, and some of them were in favor of splitting the town between the English and Native Americans. Williams called for a town meeting while Timothy was in Albany, and while many of the Native American voters were away on their winter syrup harvest. Timothy heard about this, but was apparently convinced his supporters would reelect him. Williams, however, brought in outsiders to vote for him and used a written ballot, as opposed to the past policy of translating everything into Mahican so that the Mahicans would understand. Even using these extreme tactics, Williams still only won by a three-vote margin. Timothy and his supporters were outraged and demanded an investigation. A petition was sent to Governor Bernard in May with 23 signatures, and Timothy sent another letter in December with 16 signatures. The investigation was delayed until October, and confirmed many of their charges, however the results were allowed to stand.

In April, Timothy was elected president of a committee to lay out eight townships within the Susquehanna purchase, and to determine the method of settling these eight, as well as two other towns. He was granted a salary of 20 pounds per month for six months for this task. In May, he was selected to represent the Massachusetts Bay Colony in selecting the settlers of these new townships. Due to a history of disputed and lopsided land sales, there were strict laws in place regarding the sale of lands by the Native Americans. This handcuffed them from being able to support themselves when they had no other means of generating income, such as in old age or to settle their debts. On this subject, Timothy lobbied the government during the winter of 1763-1764 and wrote to Andrew Oliver in November 1764, asking that they be allowed the same rights to sell their lands as the English. By this time, most citizens on both sides, including Timothy Woodbridge, were in favor of creating a separate township for the Native Americans and the Woodbridge family and friends. However, when the commissioners proposed that the English would then have to support their own school and church, without the mission funding, the proposal was almost universally opposed by the English.

Timothy was again elected to the General Court in 1765. In October, he was granted oversight of sales for the Stockbridges, so that they could settle their debts and retain some of their more productive land that they had pawned. He could also supervise grant temporary leases for lands that they were not using. The same year, Timothy became involved with a grievance of the Wappinger tribe, regarding land claims in New York, and wrote to William Johnson on their behalf.

In June 1766, Timothy issued a warrant for a meeting to elect officers, to form the town of Becket. By 1767, the English residents of Stockbridge were again working to create a separate township for themselves, behind Timothy's back. The following year, Timothy and his brother Joseph again tried to seek William Johnson's help in New York regarding land claims. The Stockbridges had to sell an additional 150 acres to pay their legal fees, and were again unsuccessful. Also in 1768, Timothy testified about the character of one of his former students, a man named Joseph Van Gelder, who was half European and half Native American. In 1769, Timothy was selected to a committee for collecting taxes from members of the Susquehanna Company, and was again elected to the General Court, serving from 1769-1771.

Timothy wrote to Eleazar Wheelock, founder of Dartmouth College, in March 1773, regarding the admission of three boys to Moor's Indian Charity School, which was a school for training Native Americans to be missionaries themselves. In June, the Stockbridges petitioned that Timothy be allowed to sell as much as their land as was required, being that their tribe was greatly in debt, and some members imprisoned on those grounds. Their petition was again granted. In December, Timothy wrote to Governor William Tryon, requesting compensation for those Stockbridge Native Americans who had fought for the British during the French and American War. Shortly before his death, Timothy was chosen a member of the Governor's Council by mandamus of King George III. However, with his loyalty lying with the colonies in the days preceding the Revolutionary War, he declined.

Timothy died on May 10, 1774, and is buried in Stockbridge.

== Family ==
Timothy married Abigail Day, a descendant of Robert Day, one of the founders of the Connecticut Colony, on November 23, 1736. When their daughter Abigail (the first European child born in the township) was born just over five months later, they each had to pay a fifty shilling fine after pleading guilty to "fornication before marriage". The Woodbridges had ten children and also had a slave servant couple with at least one child of their own. Their son Enoch Woodbridge fought in the American Revolution, was the first mayor of Vergennes, Vermont, and a justice of the Vermont Supreme Court. Enoch's grandson was Frederick E. Woodbridge, who was a member of the United States House of Representatives.
