= Samuel Woodbridge =

Samuel Woodbridge may refer to:

- Samuel Merrill Woodbridge (1819–1905), American clergyman, theologian, author and college professor
- Samuel Isett Woodbridge (1856–1926), American Presbyterian missionary to China
