= Samuel Sewall =

Judge in Colonial America (1652 – 1730)

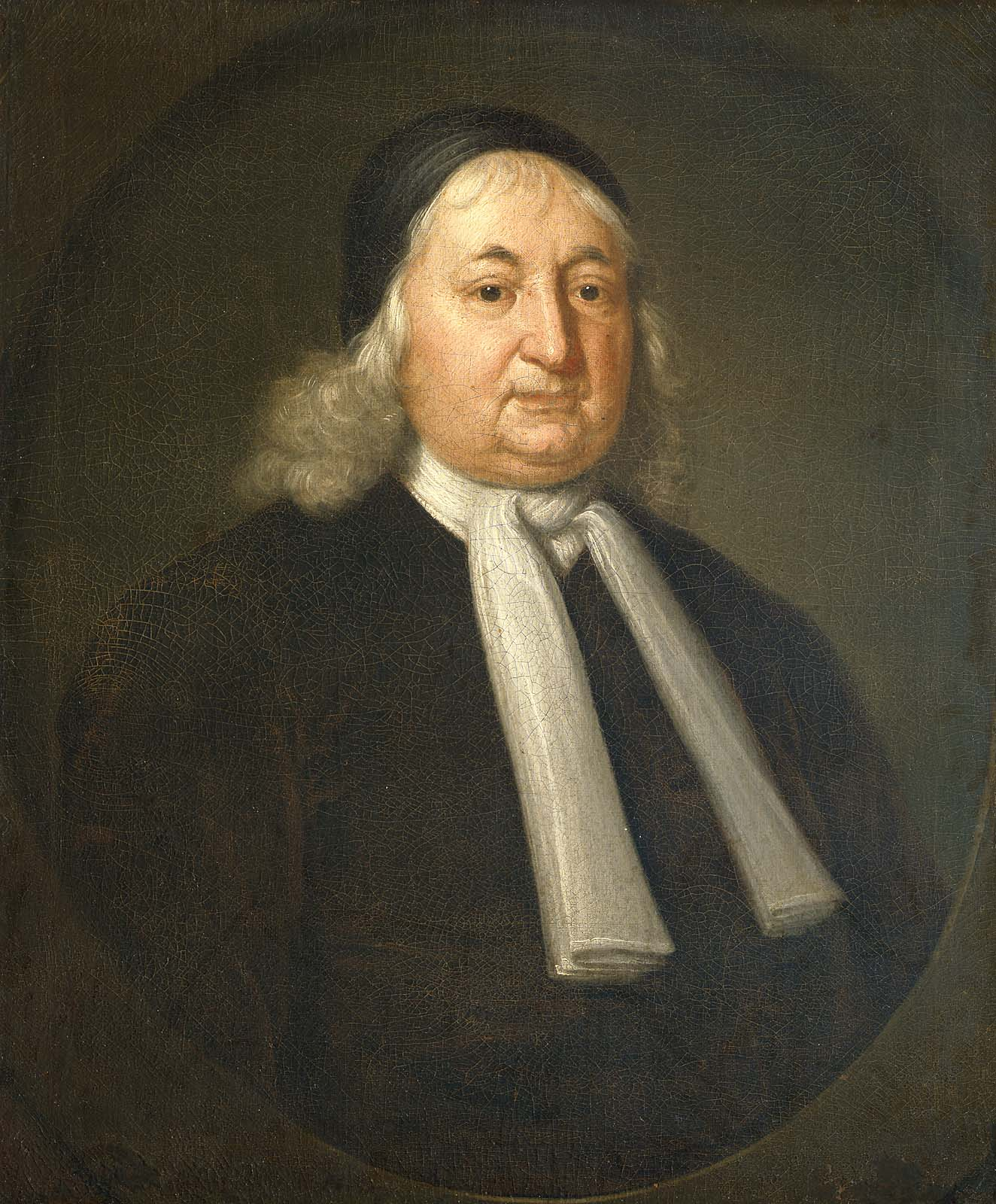
- Portrait by John Smibert, 1729
- Born: March 28, 1652; Bishopstoke, Hampshire, England
- Died: January 1, 1730 (aged 77); Boston, Province of Massachusetts Bay
- Education: Harvard College
- Occupation: Judge
- Known for: Salem witch trials
- Spouse(s): Hannah Hull; Abigail (Melyen) Woodmansey Tilley; Mary (Shrimpton) Gibbs

Samuel Sewall (/ˈsjuːəl/; March 28, 1652 – January 1, 1730) was a judge, businessman, and printer in the Province of Massachusetts Bay, best known for his involvement in the Salem witch trials, for which he later apologized, and his essay The Selling of Joseph (1700), which criticized slavery. He served for many years as the chief justice of the Massachusetts Superior Court of Judicature, the province's high court.

== Biography ==
Sewall was born in Bishopstoke, Hampshire, England, on March 28, 1652, the son of Henry and Jane (Dummer) Sewall. His father, son of the mayor of Coventry, had come to the Massachusetts Bay Colony in 1635, where he married Sewall's mother and returned to England in the 1640s.

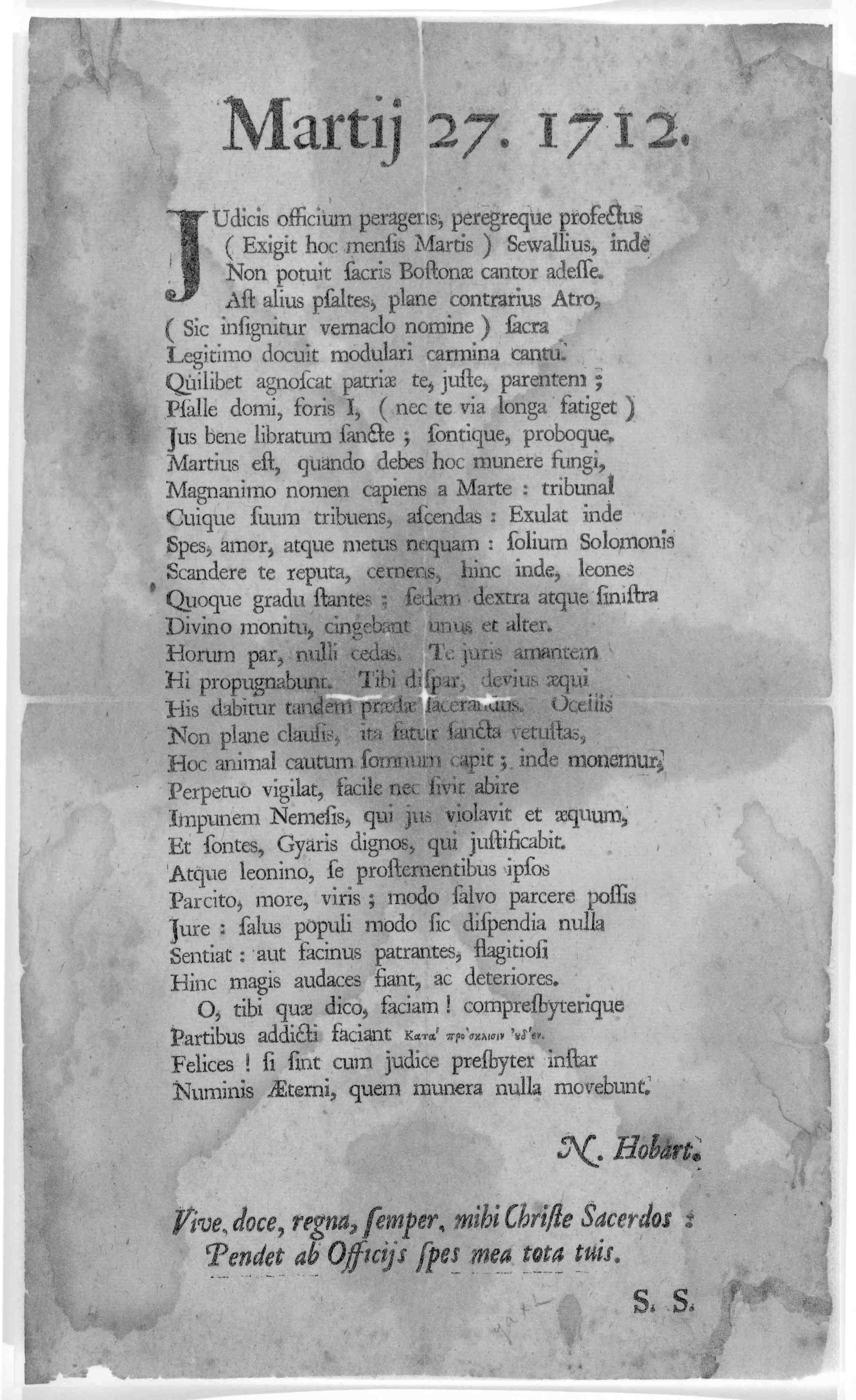
Poem by Nehemiah Hobart in Latin, printed by Samuel Sewall, Boston, 1712

Following the Restoration of Charles II in 1660 to the English throne the Sewalls again crossed the Atlantic, settling in Newbury, Massachusetts. Like other local boys, he attended school at the home of James Noyes, whose cousin, Reverend Thomas Parker, was the principal instructor. From Parker, Sewall acquired a lifelong love of verse, which he wrote in both English and Latin. In 1667 Sewall entered Harvard College, where his classmates included Edward Taylor and Daniel Gookin, with whom he formed enduring friendships. Sewall received his B.A. in 1671 and his M.A. in 1674. In 1674 he served as librarian of Harvard for nine months, the second person to hold that post. That year he began keeping a journal, which he maintained for most of his life; it is one of the major historical documents of the time. In 1679 he became a member of the Military Company of Massachusetts.

Sewall's oral examination for the MA was a public affair and was witnessed by Hannah Hull, daughter of colonial merchant and mintmaster, John Hull. She was apparently taken by the young man's charms and pursued him. They were married in February 1676. Her father, whose work as mintmaster had made him quite wealthy, gave the couple £500 in colonial currency as a wedding gift. Biographer Richard Francis notes that the weight of this amount of specie, 125 pounds (57 kg), may have approximated the bride's weight, giving rise to Nathaniel Hawthorne's legend that the gift was her weight in coins. Sewall moved into his in-laws' mansion in Boston and was soon involved in that family's business and political affairs. He and Hannah had fourteen children before her death in 1717, although only a few survived to adulthood.

Sewall's involvement in the political affairs of the colony began when he became a freeman of the colony, giving him the right to vote. In 1681 he was appointed the official printer of the colony. One of the first works he published was John Bunyan's The Pilgrim's Progress. After Hull died in 1683, Sewall was elected to replace him on the colony's council of assistants, a body that functioned both as the upper house of the legislature and as a court of appeals. He also became a member of Harvard's Board of Overseers.

Sewall entered local politics and was elevated to the position of assistant magistrate in the judiciary. In 1692 he was one of the nine judges appointed to the court of Oyer and Terminer in Salem, charged with trying those from Salem Town and elsewhere who were accused of witchcraft. His diary recounts many of the more famous episodes of the trials, such as the agonizing death under torture of Giles Corey, and reflects the growing public unease about the guilt of many of the accused. Sewall's brother Stephen had meanwhile opened up his home to one of the initially afflicted children, Betty Parris, daughter of Salem Village's minister Samuel Parris, and shortly afterward Betty's "afflictions" appear to have subsided.

Sewall was perhaps most remarkable among the justices involved in the trials in that he later regretted his role, going so far as to call for a public day of prayer, fasting, and reparations. Following the dissolution of the court, the Sewall family was blighted by what Sewall thought to be punishments from God. In the five years after the trials, two of Sewall's daughters and Hannah's mother died, and Hannah gave birth to a stillborn child. What convinced Sewall of his need for public repentance was a recitation of Matthew 12:7, "If ye had known what this meaneth, I will have mercy and not sacrifice, ye would not have condemned the guiltless". Not only had Sewall's home life been shaken, but in the years after the trials, the people of Massachusetts came to see them as the culmination of a generation-long series of setbacks and ordeals, notably the Navigation Acts, the declaration of the New England Dominion, and King Philip's War. He saw this as a sign not that witchcraft did not exist, but that he had ruled on insubstantial evidence. He records in his diary that on 14 January 1697, he stood up in the meeting house he attended while his minister read out his confession of guilt.

In 1693 Sewall was appointed an associate justice of the Superior Court of Judicature, the province's high court, by Governor Sir William Phips.

In May 1712, Sewall laid the cornerstone of today's Old State House in Boston. He also carved his initials and date into the stone.

In 1717, Sewall was appointed Superior Court of Judicature's chief justice by Governor Samuel Shute.

Sewall died in Boston on January 1, 1730, aged 77, and was interred in the family tomb at Boston's Granary Burying Ground. Sewall married three times. Hannah Hull, his first wife, died in 1717; two years later, in 1719, Sewall married Abigail (Melyen) Woodmansey Tilley, who died seven months later. In 1722, he married Mary (Shrimpton) Gibbs, who survived him. His nephew, Stephen, served as a Massachusetts chief justice, as did his great-grandson Samuel.

== Views and writings ==
Coat of Arms of Samuel Sewall

=== Abolitionism ===
Apart from his involvement in the Salem witch trials, Sewall was liberal in his views for the time. In 1700, he wrote and published "The Selling of Joseph: A Memorial," a tract that made a biblically based case that slavery was unjustified and sinful. It was the first anti-slavery document ever published in North America. Written like a sermon, "Selling" argues that "Liberty is in real value next unto Life: None ought to part with it themselves, or deprive others of it, but upon the most mature Consideration." Enslaving people of Black African descent was contrary to God's design for the world because according to scripture, all humankind were "the sons of Adam" and "of One Blood" and had the same right to freedom. Freedom, including for Black Americans, Sewall writes, should be valued more than profit. Sewall further argued that it was inopportune to lament the “barbarous” enslavement in Africa of many of his fellow New Englanders, while keeping Africans in Massachusetts. His title refers to the biblical story of Joseph, son of Israel, whose brothers unjustly sold him into slavery, comparing the enslavement of Black Americans to Joseph's own unjustified bondage. "Selling" propagates a segregationist perspective, and Sewall claims that Black Africans could not peacefully live among white New Englanders. Nevertheless, his argument against slavery is, at least according to one historian, a "courageous… public stand".

Sewall had published "Selling" in response to learning that Boston judge John Saffin had refused to release a Black indentured servant named Adam and intended to perpetually enslave Adam. After "Selling" was released, Saffin issued a rebuttal arguing that social hierarchies were necessary and that enslaving Black Americans was divinely ordained. Adam was set free after a lengthy trial, but Saffin's rebuttal held greater sway among Bostonians, and chattel slavery persisted in Massachusetts. "Selling" was only reprinted twice (one in the 1700s and again in 1863), and it became an obscure document. Sewall's own nephew, also named Samuel Sewall, rejected his uncle's arguments against chattel slavery and continued participating in it as a business.

=== Women's rights and other views ===
His essay "Talitha Cumi," first published in 1725, refers to the "right of women." When the periwig became fashionable in New England, Sewall condemned the fashion vehemently, in contrast to Cotton Mather, who saw no reason why a Puritan should not wear a wig. Sewall's journal, kept from 1673 to 1729, describes his life as a Puritan against the changing tide of colonial life as the devoutly religious community of Massachusetts gradually adopted more secular attitudes and emerged as a liberal, cosmopolitan-minded community.

== Cultural influence ==
- The Crucible (1996 film): Judge Samuel Sewall was played by actor George Gaynes. Notably, he is the first judge to begin doubting the circumstances, and by the end of the film, he is asking his superior, Judge Danforth, to end the trials as he and the townspeople have tired of the deaths and executions brought on by the court.

== Bibliography ==
Works written by Sewall include:

- The Revolution in New England Justified, 1691
- Phaenomena quaedam Apolyptica, 1697 online text (PDF version)
- The Selling of Joseph, 1700
- Proposals Touching the Accomplishment of Prophecies, 1713
- Diary of Samuel Sewall, 1674–1729. Edited M. Halsey Thomas in two volumes, Farrar, Straus and Giroux, New York, 1973.
- Talitha Cumi, or Damsel, Arise, 1725. Reprinted in Eve LaPlante, Salem Witch Judge,' 2007, 2008.

== Notes ==
Legal offices
New seat	Associate Justice of the Massachusetts Superior Court of Judicature; 1692–1718	Succeeded by Paul Dudley
Preceded by Wait Winthrop	Chief Justice of the Massachusetts Superior Court of Judicature; 1718–1728	Succeeded by Benjamin Lynde Sr.
