= Samuel Haugh =

American silversmith

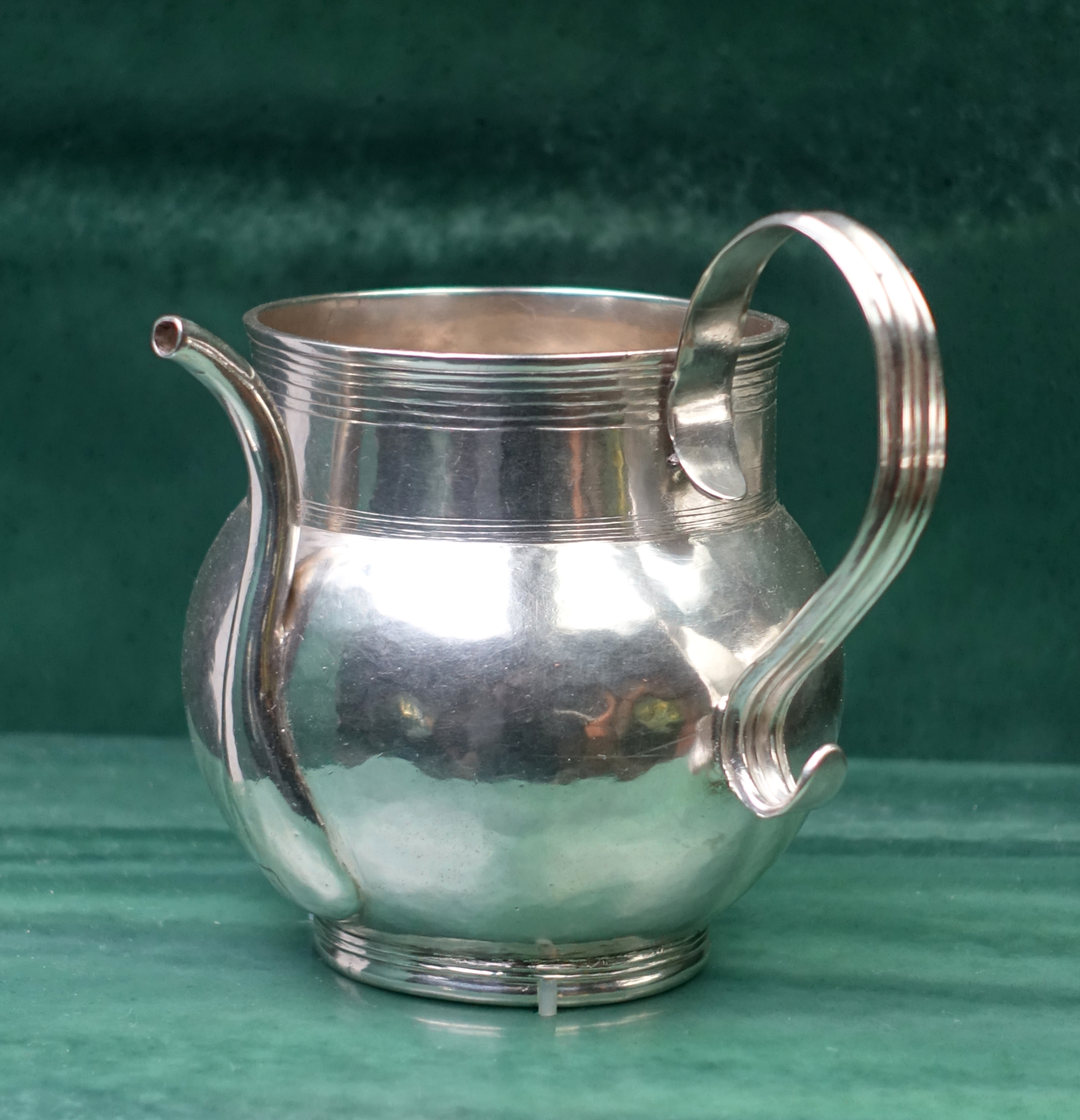
Spout cup by Samuel Haugh, before 1717

Samuel Haugh (February 1, 1675 – June 9, 1717) was an early American silversmith, active in Boston. Only three of his works are known to survive: two cups and a spoon.

Haugh was born in Boston to Rev. Samuel Haugh and Ann Raynsford. Upon his father's untimely death in June 1679, the diarist Samuel Sewall became his guardian. In 1690, he became apprentice to silversmith Thomas Savage, as recorded in an entry in Sewall's diary:

"Thorsday [sic], November the Sixth 1690, at my House in Boston Samuel Haugh and Mr. Thomas Savage mutually sign'd, seal'd and delivered Indentures to each other; Sam to serve him from 7th Octr last, Seven Years and Six Moneths [sic]. Witnesses, S.S. Joseph Wheeler, Jn. Cole, Thomas Banister."

After his apprenticeship, he married Margaret (Cowell) Johnson on September 30, 1697, in Boston, and there worked from 1697– 1717 as a silversmith. In 1713 he served as second sargeant in the Artillery Company. An entry in the Sewall Papers records his burial:

"[1717, June] 9. Mr. Sam. Hough buried; Mr. Edwards, Ellis, Williams Retailer were 3 of the Bearers. I had a scarf. Mr Eliakim Hutchinson & I follow'd next after the Mourners, 42 upon the Coffin."
