= Thomas Parker (minister) =

English nonconforming clergyman

Thomas Parker (1595–1677) was an English nonconforming clergyman and a founder of Newbury, Massachusetts.

== Early life in Europe ==
Parker was born at Stanton St. Bernard, Wiltshire, the only son of the Revd. Robert Parker, M.A. and Dorothy Stevens. He received his schooling from his uncle William Noyes of Cholderton, Wiltshire, 'perhaps a godly, but a very severe master', who prepared him successfully for a University education. Following his father's departure into the Netherlands as a religious exile, Thomas matriculated sizar at Trinity College, Dublin at Michaelmas 1610. There he came to the attention of James Ussher, who, finding him a promising student, gave him encouragement. Returning to England he matriculated from Magdalen College, Oxford in April 1613: but a little more than a year later, in July 1614 (the year of his father's death at Doesburg, Gelderland) he registered as a student of Theology in the University of Leyden. He then proceeded to the University of Franeker, in Friesland, where he studied with his father's friend and colleague William Ames, taking his Master's degree on 1 April 1617. Parker returned to England, settling at Newbury in Berkshire, where he taught at St. Bartholomew's School, and served as assistant preacher to William Twisse.

== Life in New England ==
Parker's puritan opinions caused him to embark for New England, with a number of Wiltshire men, in the Mary and John of London, 26 March 1634; they landed in May. Approximately one hundred settled at Agawam, afterwards Ipswich, Massachusetts, where Parker remained a year as Teacher assisting Nathaniel Ward, the Pastor.

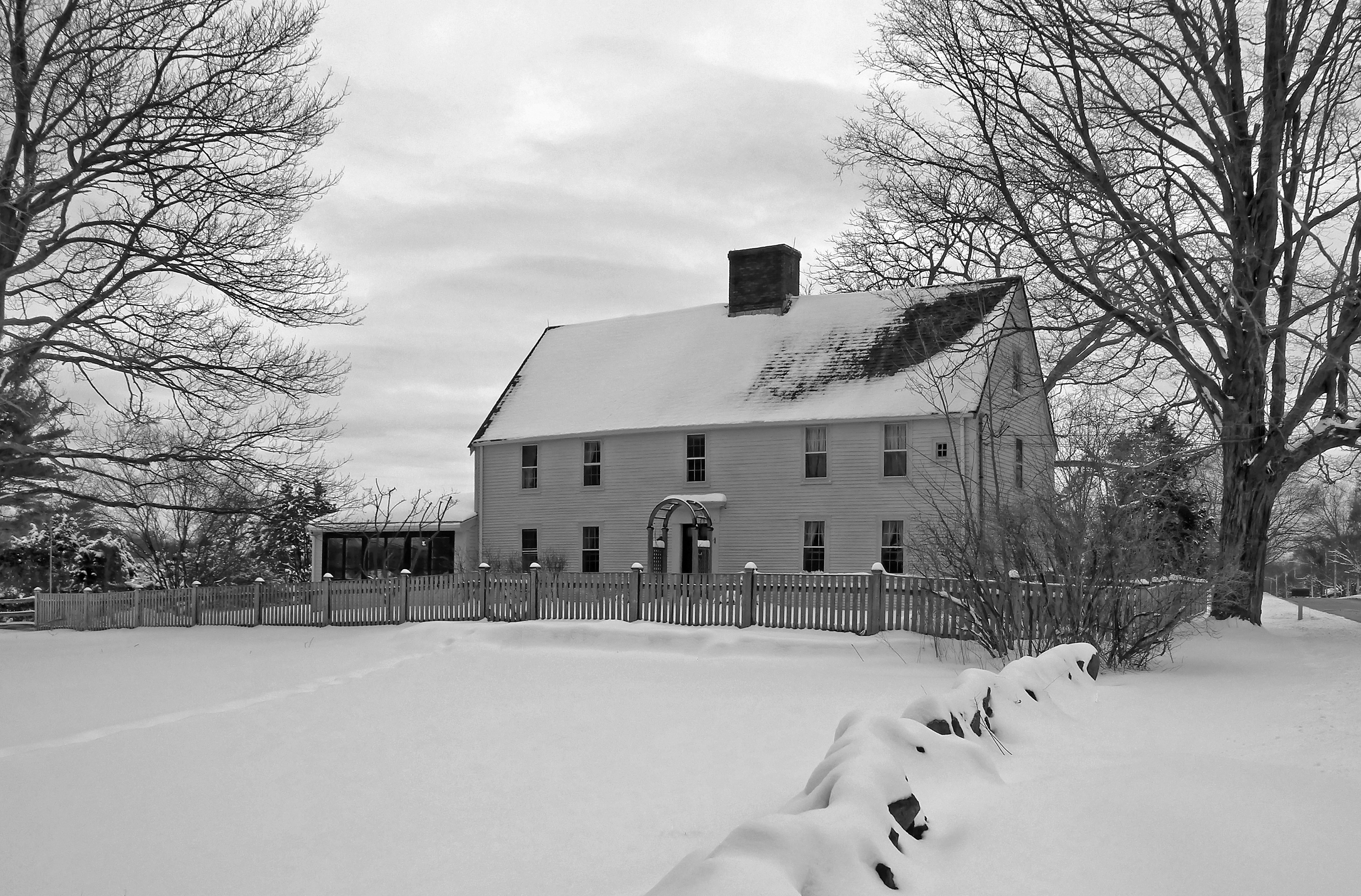
The house at Newbury, Mass., where James Noyes and Thomas Parker dwelt

Parker, together with his cousin Rev. James Noyes, his nephew Rev. John Woodbridge, and some others, obtained leave of the general court to remove to Quascacunquen at the mouth of the Merrimack River, and the settlement was incorporated as a township under the name of Newbury or Newberry in the spring of 1635. Noyes was chosen teacher and Parker first pastor of the church, the tenth established in the colony. He remained at Newbury for the rest of his life, "the beauty, holiness, charity, and humbleness of his life," says Cotton Mather, "giving his people a perpetual and most lively commentary on his doctrine." At about this time, he became the guardian and tutor of Shubael Dummer, whose mother had died shortly after childbirth and whose father, Richard, had returned to England.

With Noyes, Parker also prepared students for Harvard, refusing all compensation for his services. On John Woodbridge's return from England in 1663, he was made assistant to Parker, who had complained of failing eyesight in 1643, and towards the end of his life became quite blind. His blindness did not prevent Parker from continuing to teach, usually twelve or fourteen pupils at the James Noyes House, where he lived with Noyes. He taught languages with ease from memory. Samuel Sewall (a cousin of Shubael Dummer) was one of his scholars and wrote about Parker in his diary. During Parker's pastorate, a bitter controversy on the subject of church government divided his parish.

Parker died unmarried on 24 April 1677, in his eighty-second year. The Quascacunquen River was renamed the Parker River in 1697.

== Works ==
The series of seventy theses defended by Parker at Leyden are found appended to some editions of William Ames's answer to Grevinchovius, as Theses Theologicae De Traductione Peccatoris Ad Vitam (Theological Theses on the bringing of the Sinful over to Life). The theses were published in London in 1657 as Methodus Divinae Gratiae in traductione hominis peccatoris ad vitam. They were objected to at the Synod of Dort, and by the theological faculty at Heidelberg, and were criticised in Parkerus Illustratus, authore Philo-Tileno, London, 1660, and The Examination of Tilenus before the Triers, by N.H., London, 1658 (by Laurence Womock).

He devoted himself to the study of prophecy and wrote several works, of which only one was published. The book was dedicated to Philip, Earl of Pembroke and Montgomery, by Thomas Bayly, who states that the author sent the manuscript over to England with neither title nor dedication.

Parker's views on ecclesiastical discipline are in the True Copy of a Letter written by T. Parker unto a Member of the Assembly of divines now at Westminster, declaring his judgement touching the Government practised in the churches of New England, London, 1644 (issued 19 February 1643, as noted by Thomason). The Letter was the subject of remarks in a pamphlet entitled M.S. to A[dam] S[tuart], with a plea for Libertie of Conscience in a Church way, London, 1644, of which a second edition appeared in the same year as Reply of two of the Brethren to A. S. Parker's opinions were shared by Noyes, but were opposed by other members of the church, and controversy raged between 1645 and 1672.

In November 1648 he addressed to Elizabeth Avery, author of Scripture Prophecies opened (1647), a Letter . . . touching sundry opinions by her professed and maintained, printed at London, 1650. She was his sister; her views were Fifth Monarchist.
