= Charles Woodbridge =

American pastor and professor (1902 - 1995)

Charles Jahleel Woodbridge (1902 - 1995) was an American Presbyterian missionary, minister, seminary professor, founding member of the National Association of Evangelicals, and author of The New Evangelicalism.

== Family and education ==
Woodbridge was born in Chinkiang, China on January 24, 1902, to Presbyterian missionaries Samuel Isett and Jeanie Wilson (Woodrow) Woodbridge, Sr. His father traced his ancestors to John Woodbridge, a Lollard preacher in 15th century England; his mother was a first cousin to US President Woodrow Wilson. He earned degrees at Princeton University, Princeton Theological Seminary, and Duke University, and was ordained as a Presbyterian minister in 1927. He was married on March 4, 1930 to Ruth Eyman Dunning, and had four children. He completed his Doctor of Philosophy at Duke University in 1945 with a dissertation titled The Chronicle of Salimbene of Parma: a Thirteenth Century Christian Synthesis.

== Career ==
Woodbridge served as pastor at First Presbyterian Church in Flushing, New York for several years before following the call to become a missionary to French Cameroons in 1932. Just a few years later, he was appointed by one of his seminary mentors, John Gresham Machen, to serve as secretary general for the newly formed Independent Board for Presbyterian Foreign Missions. Both he and Machen were later censured by the Presbyterian Church because of their defense of orthodoxy against liberal and modernist theology. In 1937, Woodbridge became pastor at First Presbyterian Church of Salisbury, North Carolina, and in 1945 became pastor of Independent Presbyterian Church in Savannah, Georgia. In 1947, he was one of the original prospects recruited for the newly founded Fuller Theological Seminary, and though he initially declined the offer, in 1950 he finally joined the faculty. During the summers, he also served as a Bible teacher for Word of Life Fellowship in Schroon Lake. In 1952, he served as president of the Evangelical Theological Society. In 1957, Woodbridge resigned his position at Fuller due to his conviction that the seminary was leaving Fundamentalism for the New Evangelicalism. Woodbridge remained a staunch separatist and was critical of movements such as Billy Graham's preaching campaigns, and Campus Crusade's Four Spiritual Laws.

== Death ==
Woodbridge died on July 16, 1995. He had been living in Bellingham, Whatcom County, Washington.

== Publications ==
- Standing on the Promises: Rich Truths from the Book of Acts (1947)
- A Handbook of Christian Truth, co-authored with Harold Lindsell (1953)
- Romans: The Epistle of Grace (1953)
- Bible Prophecy (1962)
- The New Evangelicalism (1969)
