= James Noyes =

English clergyman

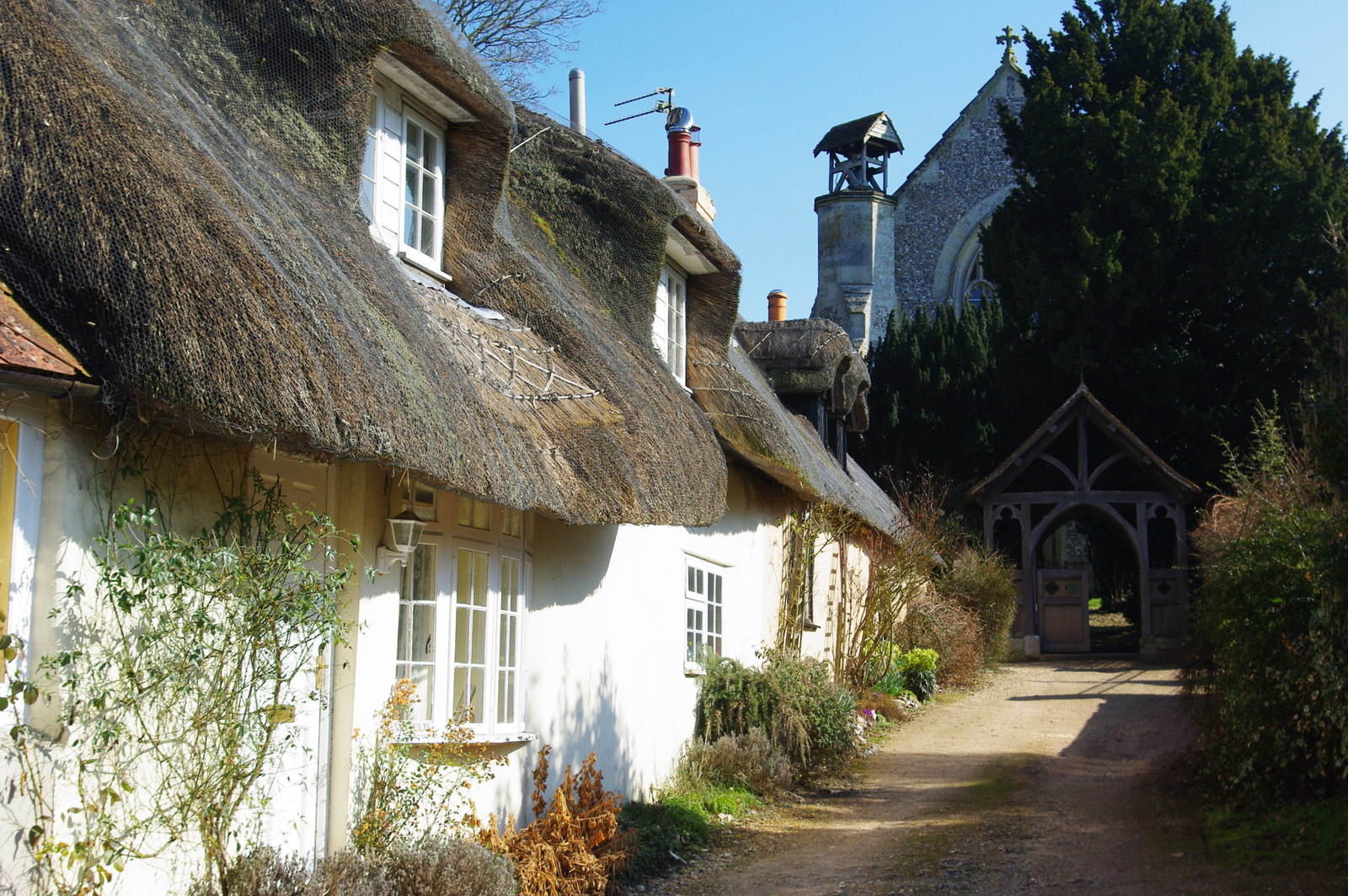
Ancient cottages near Cholderton church, Wiltshire

Rev. James Noyes (born 1608, Wiltshire, England – died 22 October 1656, Newbury, Massachusetts Bay Colony) was an English clergyman who emigrated to Massachusetts. He was a founder of Newbury, Massachusetts.

== Biography ==
Coat of Arms of James Noyes

James Noyes was the fifth son of the Rev. William Noyes of Cholderton, Wiltshire, and his wife Anne, and was born at Cholderton in 1608. He was the cousin, on his mother's side, of Thomas Parker (1595-1677), who had been left to the education of William Noyes when his father Robert Parker fled into exile in the Netherlands in 1607. Educated under the guidance of his father, and receiving much instruction from Parker, he entered Brasenose College, Oxford in 1627, but did not proceed to a degree. After studying in Dublin, Oxford and Leyden, Parker returned to teach at Newbury in Berkshire, where he was assistant preacher to William Twisse: Parker summoned James to assist him, and under their guidance James found his vocation. In 1633 James married Sarah, eldest daughter of Joseph Brown of Southampton and his wife Sarah Hibbert, and on March 1634 Parker and Noyes, together with his brother Nicholas Noyes and nephew John Woodbridge, and their families, emigrated to New England. They sailed aboard the Mary and John of London, accompanied by the Hercules: the ship was detained in the River Thames where all passengers signed the Oath of Allegiance to the King and the Church before they were allowed to sail from London.

During the voyage Parker and Noyes preached or expounded every day, one in the morning and the other in the afternoon, and were "abundant in prayer". Arriving in May 1634, they made landfall at Nantaskut in Massachusetts Bay Colony. Thomas Parker went with around 100 others to the new plantation at Agawam (Ipswich, Massachusetts) where as Teacher he assisted Nathaniel Ward as Pastor. James Noyes served at first in Medford, the settlement on the north side of the Mystic River laid out for Matthew Cradock. Parker and his company remained at Agawam through the winter, and in the following spring sought permission from the General Court to settle on the Quascacunquen River (now called the Parker River). This was granted in May 1635, only weeks before the revocation of the (Plymouth Council) Great Charter of New England, and the settlement of Newbury, Massachusetts proceeded. A church (the tenth in the Colony) being gathered, Thomas Parker became their Pastor, and James Noyes, though also invited to a ministry at Watertown, preferred to join his dear friend at Newbury as Teacher. Both remained there for the rest of their lives. Noyes and Parker prepared students for Harvard, refusing all compensation for their services: twelve or fourteen pupils at a time were taught at the James Noyes House, where both men lived.

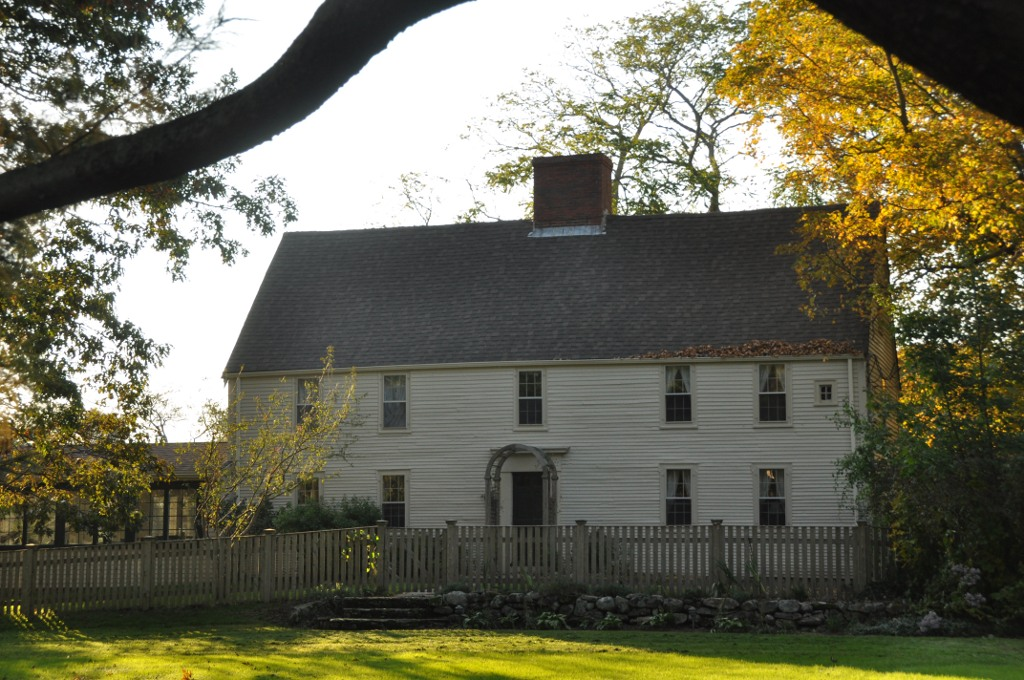
The house at Newbury, Mass. where Thomas Parker and James Noyes dwelt

The following portrait of Noyes by Thomas Parker deserves quotation in full:

"He was a man of singular qualifications: in piety excelling, an implacable enemy to all heresy and schism, and a most able warrior against the same. He was of a reaching and ready apprehension, a large invention, a most profound judgement, a rare, tenacious, and comprehensive memory, fixed and unmoveable in his grounded conceptions, sure in words and speech, without rashness, gentle and mild in expression, without all passion or provocative language; and as he was a notable disputant, so he never would provoke his adversary, saving by the short knocks and heavy weight of argument. He was of so loving and compassionate and humble carriage, that I believe never any were acquainted with him, but did desire the continuance of his society and acquaintance. He was resolute for the truth, and in defence thereof, had no respect for any persons. He was a most excellent counsellor in doubts, and could strike at a hair's breadth, like the Benjaminites, and expedite the entangled out of briars. He was courageous in dangers, and still was apt to believe the best, and made fair weather in a storm. He was much honoured and esteemed in the country, and his death was much bewailed. I think he may be reckoned amongst the greatest worthies of his age."

The James Noyes House, built ca. 1646, is a historic First Period house at 7 Parker Street in Newbury, Massachusetts. It was added to the National Register of Historic Places in 1990.

== Writings ==
- The Temple Measured: or, a brief survey of the temple mystical, which is the instituted church of Christ (For Edmund Paxton, London 1647).
- A Short Catechism composed by Mr James Noyes, Late Teacher of the Church of Christ in Newbury, For the use of the Children there (Printed by Samuel Green and Marmaduke Johnson, Cambridge 1661).
- Moses and Aaron, or the Rights of Church and State (By T.R. for Emund Paxton, London 1661).

== Yale ==
His son, Rev. James Noyes II of Stonington, Connecticut, was one of the first trustees of Yale College, a group of ten Congregationalist ministers, now known as "The Founders". Their engraved names line the facade of Woodbridge Hall at Yale University. The building is named for Timothy Woodbridge, cousin to Rev. James Noyes II and one of the other ten founding ministers of the college.

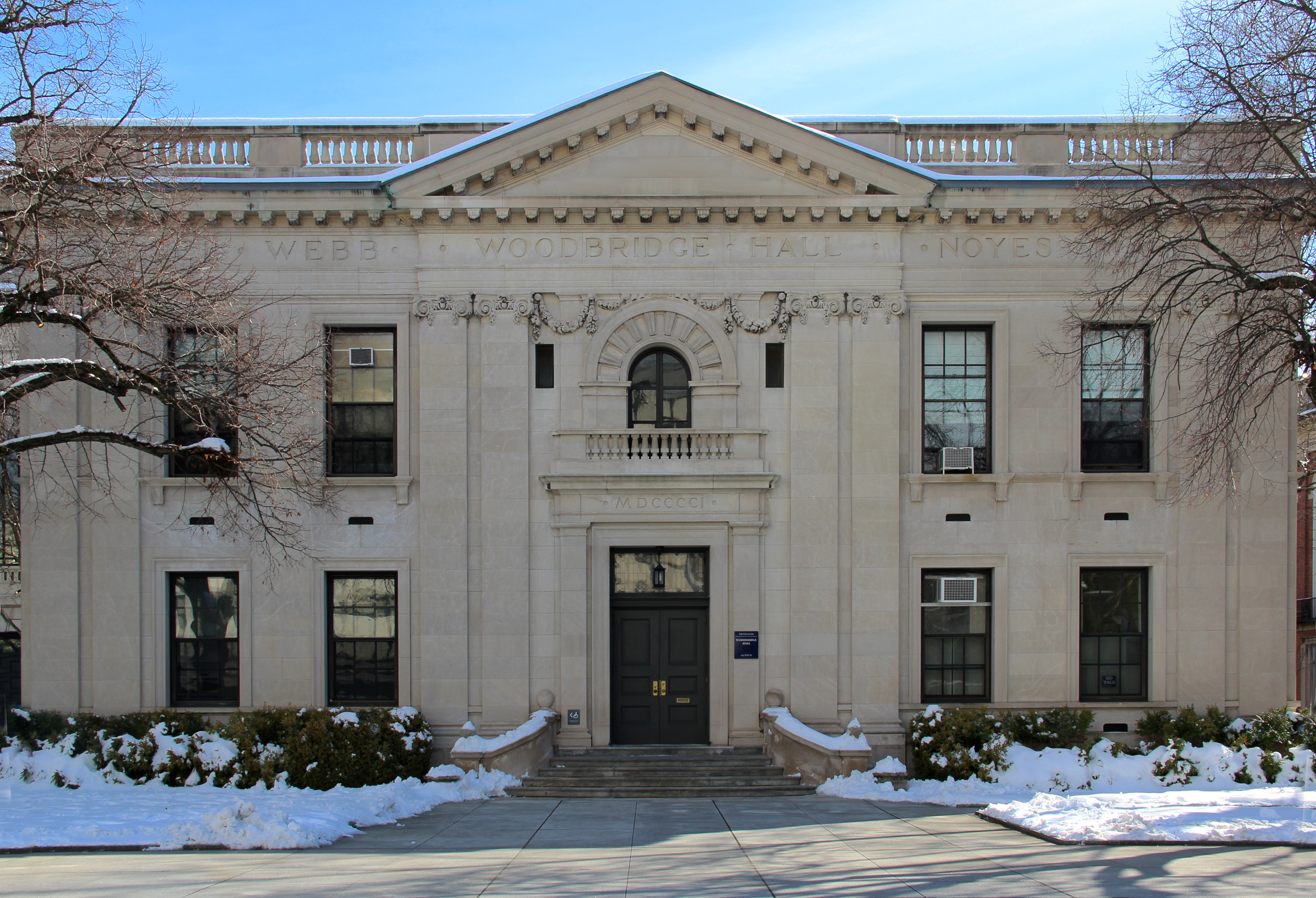
Woodbridge Hall

The Noyes Family continues a long tradition at Yale with notable persons having contributed to the University. Rev. James Noyes II was the first Senior Fellow (Chair) of the Board of Trustees, and his younger brother Rev. Moses Noyes also served as a member of the Trustees. Dr. John Noyes graduated Yale 1775. Rev. Daniel Parker Noyes graduated Yale 1840, as did his two sons Edward Parish Noyes, 1880, and Frederic A. Noyes, 1862. Theodore R. Noyes receive a Yale medical degree 1867. Haskell Noyes graduated Yale 1908. Herbert MacArthur Noyes graduated Yale 1914. Newbold Noyes, Jr. graduated Yale 1941. Herbert MacArthur Noyes Jr. graduated Yale 1949. Thomas E. Noyes graduated Yale 1953. Professor Edward Simpson Noyes, PhD (1892-1967) graduated Yale 1913, was a professor of English at Yale for 40 years, and served as chairman of the Board of Admissions for 18 years, director of the Master of Arts in Teaching program, and received the Yale Medal of Honor in 1968. His son, Dr. Edward “Ted” MacArthur Noyes II (1919-1999), graduated Yale 1940 and was also presented with the Yale Medal of Honor for his lifetime service to Yale in 1996, and served as president of the Yale Club of New Haven. His son, Dr. Edward MacArthur Noyes III and daughter Nancy Noyes Foss were the first brother and sister to graduate together from Yale in 1971.

== Family ==
His son James Noyes II (born 11 March 1640, Newbury – 30 December 1719, Stonington, Connecticut) was also a clergyman and founded Yale College. He graduated from Harvard in 1659, began to preach in 1664, and was pastor of the church in Stonington, Connecticut from 1674 until his death. A councilor in civil affairs in the critical periods of his colony, James Noyes II also practiced medicine with success.

Early Noyes descendants often were ministers and teachers, and sometimes distinguished – for example, the Salem Witch Trials (James's nephew Nicholas Noyes) and the founding of Yale College.

On 14 November 1692, during the Salem Witch Trials, 17-year-old Mary Herrick accused Noyes' daughter, Sarah Noyes Hale (wife of John Hale), and the ghost of executed Mary Eastey of afflicting her, but she was never formally charged with witchcraft or arrested. A later commentator on the trials, Charles Upham suggests that this accusation was one that helped turn public opinion to end the prosecutions, and spurred John Hale's willingness to reconsider his support of the trials.

Rev James Noyes I is also the ancestor of John Humphrey Noyes, leader of the Perfectionist movement and founder of the Oneida Community.

The daughter of Rev. James Noyes I, Sarah Noyes, is the great-grandmother of American hero Nathan Hale.

== See also ==
- James Noyes House
- Thomas Parker (minister), his cousin, and co-founder of Newbury
- William Noyes, his father
- Yale University
