= John Woodbridge V =

John Woodbridge V (1582–1637) was rector of the parish of Stanton, near Highworth in Wiltshire, England. In his work Magnalia, Reverend Cotton Mather extolled Woodbridge as "a minister so able and faithful as to obtain a high esteem among those that at all knew the invaluable worth of such a minister."

== Life ==
John Woodbridge was born at Stanton, near Highworth, Wiltshire, England, in 1582 to Reverend John Woodbridge IV and died 9 December 1637 at Stanton. He was fifth in a line of men by the same name – all ministers – the first of whom, Reverend John Woodbridge I, was a follower of John Wycliffe, a 14th-century translator of the Bible.

== Family ==
John Woodbridge married Sarah Parker, born 1583 at Cholderton, Wiltshire, England, daughter of the Reverend Robert Parker, M.A., of Wiltshire. She died in 1683. In his work Magnalia, Reverend Cotton Mather described Sarah as a woman "who did so virtuously, that her own personal character would have made her highly esteemed, if a relation to such a father had not farther added unto the lustre of her character."

John Woodbridge and Sarah Parker were the parents of the following children:

- Rev. John Woodbridge VI, born 1613 at Stanton, England, died 17 March 1694/1695; married Mercy Dudley, daughter of Governor Thomas Dudley and sister of Anne Bradstreet, on 20 May 1639, probably in Newbury, Massachusetts. They had twelve children. Dudley Woodbridge, judge-advocate of Barbados and director-general of the Royal Assiento Company, who died on 11 February 1721, and whose portrait was painted by Kneller, was their grandson.
- Sarah Woodbridge, born about 1614; married John Kendige, a schoolmaster in Lyme Regis, Dorset, England. He was a dissenting minister later in Cullerton, Devonshire, England.
- Timothy Woodbridge, was named in his father's will and probably was the younger brother of John, who is mentioned by Cotton Mather as having "d. upon the voyage."
- Lucy Woodbridge; married Sparhawk, probably the Rev. Edward Sparhawk of Black Notley, Essex, England.
- Rev. Benjamin Woodbridge, born 1622 in Wiltshire, England. He matriculated at Oxford University on 9 November 1638. However, because of unsettled conditions in England caused by growing strife between the Crown and Parliament, he left his studies at Magdalen Hall and embarked in 1639 for New England. He entered Harvard College and was first graduate of that College, receiving his B.A. degree at the head of a class of nine students at the first Commencement 23 September 1642. He returned to England with his brother, John. In 1647 he was appointed minister at Newbury, Berkshire. On 16 November of the following year after residence at Magdalen Hall, Oxford University, he received his M.A. degree. He was dismissed at Newbury in 1662 but continued to preach privately. He was a member of the Savoy Conference and served as Chaplain to King Charles II. He received Episcopal Ordination after the Restoration, but subsequently he became a non-conformist. He never returned to New England. He died 1 November 1684 in Inglefield, Berkshire, England, sine prole. He was buried 4 November from the Parish Church of St. Nicholas, Newbury, "being followed by a vast concourse of people, but there is no record to mark the spot of his interment."
- Hester Woodbridge, was named in her father's will.

== Sources ==
- Holden, Barbara R. (2001). "North Andover - The Original Andover," The Essex Genealogist, Vol. 21:195-199.
- Woodlief, A. (n.d.). Biography of Anne Bradstreet, Virginia Commonwealth University
- White, Elizabeth (1971). Anne Bradstreet: "The Tenth Muse". New York: Oxford University Press. pp. 255–6. ISBN 978-0-19-501440-2.
- Ezell, Margaret (1999). Social Authorship and the Advent of Print. Baltimore: Johns Hopkins University Press. p. 49. ISBN 978-0-8018-6139-0.

Attribution

This article incorporates text from a publication now in the public domain: "Woodbridge, Benjamin". Dictionary of National Biography. London: Smith, Elder & Co. 1885–1900.
