= Stanton St Bernard =

Village in Wiltshire, England

Coordinates: 51.360°N 1.868°W

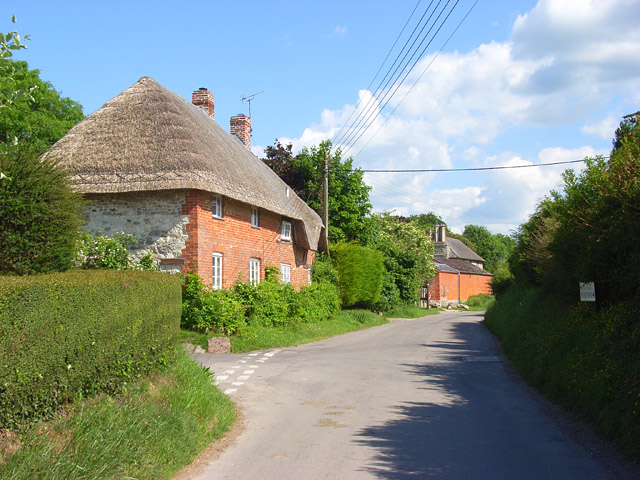
- Corner Cottage, The Street

- Location within Wiltshire
- Population: 189 (in 2011)
- OS grid reference: SU093623
- Unitary authority: Wiltshire
- Ceremonial county: Wiltshire
- Region: South West
- Country: England
- Sovereign state: United Kingdom
- Post town: Marlborough
- Postcode district: SN8
- Dialling code: 01672
- Police: Wiltshire
- Fire: Dorset and Wiltshire
- Ambulance: South Western
- UK Parliament: East Wiltshire
- Website: Parish Council

Stanton St Bernard is a village and civil parish in the Vale of Pewsey, Wiltshire, England. Its nearest town is Devizes, about 6 miles (10 km) away to the west.

The parish is tall and narrow, extending north onto the Marlborough Downs where it includes Milk Hill, the highest point in Wiltshire.

== History ==
Evidence of prehistoric activity in the area includes earthworks on Milk Hill. The Wansdyke early medieval earthwork crosses the north of the parish. The boundaries of the parish were defined in Saxon times and remain largely unchanged.

The Domesday Book of 1086 recorded 46 households at Stantone, held by Wilton Abbey, within Swanborough hundred. The manor continued to be held by the abbey until its dissolution in 1539. The manor was granted to Sir William Herbert in 1544, who was created Earl of Pembroke in 1551, and the estate remained with the Pembrokes until 1917. Tenants of the demesne farm included the Prater family. Anthony Prater (1545-1583) was subject to litigation for extortion and was excommunicated from the Catholic church.

The former manor house and Mill Farmhouse (a former watermill) are from the 17th century; Church Farmhouse is from the late 18th.

The Kennet and Avon Canal was built through the parish in 1807. The wharf at Honeystreet, just over the eastern boundary, served the area.

A small school was built in 1849, next to the church. It closed in 1970 and the children transferred to the school at Woodborough; the building became the village hall.

Population of the parish peaked in the late 19th century, with 371 recorded at the 1871 census and 373 in 1891, then declined throughout the 20th century.

== Religious sites ==
A church, which became the parish church of All Saints, was first mentioned in 1267. The tower was added in the 15th century, then in 1832 all except the tower was rebuilt in Gothic style; a further rebuilding of the chancel became necessary in 1859. The church has a 13th-century stone font and a richly coloured east window by Lavers & Barraud, 1867.

The benefice was united with that of Alton Barnes with Alton Priors in 1928, with the parsonage house at Stanton St Bernard to be sold, taking effect on the next vacancy (which occurred in 1932). A team ministry was established for the area in 1975, and today the parish is part of the Vale of Pewsey Churches, alongside 15 others.

A Wesleyan Methodist chapel was built in 1841 and closed in the early 20th century.

== Local government ==
The civil parish elects a parish council. All significant local government services are provided by Wiltshire Council, a unitary authority with its headquarters in Trowbridge, and the parish is represented there by Paul Oatway.

== Notable people ==
Scholarly vicars of Stanton St Bernard include Robert Parker, from 1594 until 1604; he fled into exile in 1607 after expressing nonconformist views. His son Thomas (1595–1677) began a career as a teacher, then emigrated to New England in 1634, alongside a number of Wiltshire men; there he was a pastor, teacher, and writer, and after his death a river was renamed after him. Thomas's sister Elizabeth was a prophet who disputed theological matters with her brother.

Robert Parker was succeeded by Richard Stephens, probably a brother of Robert's wife, Dorothy. Richard's son Nathaniel (c.1606–1678) was a controversial clergyman.

In the early 19th century, Robert and William Tasker, of Stanton St Bernard, established the Waterloo Ironworks in Hampshire. This developed into Taskers of Andover, making engines and heavy vehicles; the brand survived into the 1990s.

Naomi Corbyn (1915–1987), mother of Labour politician Jeremy Corbyn, lived in Stanton St Bernard from around 1980.
