= Samuel Isett Woodbridge =

Rev. Samuel Isett Woodbridge, Sr.
- Born: October 16, 1856; Henderson, Kentucky, US
- Died: July 23, 1926 (aged 69); Shanghai, China
- Resting place: Shanghai, China
- Education: Rutgers A.B. 1876, Columbia Theological Seminary 1880, Princeton Theological Seminary 1882, Westminster College (Missouri) D.D. 1910
- Occupations: Presbyterian missionary, author, translator, Magazine editor
- Known for: Mission work in China
- Spouse(s): Jeanie Wilson Woodrow, Dr. Mary Newell
- Relatives: Rev. John Woodbridge IV

Rev. Samuel Isett Woodbridge, Sr. (1856–1926) was an American Presbyterian missionary to China. He authored several books on the experience, and also translated into English various works of Chinese literature.

== Early life and education ==
Woodbridge was born in Henderson, Henderson County, Kentucky on October 16, 1856 to Rev. Jahleel Woodbridge and Louise Caroline Ligon.

He graduated from Rutgers College in absentia with a Bachelor of Arts in 1876, later studying at Columbia Theological Seminary from 1879 to 1880. On April 8, 1880, he was admitted upon Examination to the membership of the First Presbyterian Church, Columbia, South Carolina. He entered studies that year at Princeton Theological Seminary where he remained until 1882, and was ordained a foreign evangelist on October 7 in Walterboro, South Carolina, by the Presbytery of Charleston. In 1910, he received a Doctor of Divinity from Westminster College in Fulton, Missouri.

== Missionary work ==
Following his ordination as a foreign evangelist in 1882, he left for China, where he served as a missionary of the Presbyterian Church in the U.S. for the remainder of his life. Upon his arrival, he worked in Chenkiang for twenty years until 1902, and then in Shanghai until his death in 1926. In Shanghai, he became the founder and editor of the Shanghai Christian Intelligencer.

== Books and magazines ==
Author

Fifty Years in China

Translator

China's Only Hope, by the Viceroy Chang Ching Tung, Revel & Co., New York

Editor

Shanghai Christian Intelligencer, also called the Chinese Christian Intelligencer, a magazine with both English and Chinese editions

== Family ==
Samuel was a grandson of Rev. Sylvester Woodbridge of New Orleans, and a descendant of Rev. John Woodbridge IV, an American immigrant from England and a member of the first graduating class of Harvard in 1642. The line was the progeny of Rev. John Woodbridge I of England, who was a follower of John Wycliffe.

Woodbridge married Jeanie Wilson Woodrow, a first cousin to US President Woodrow Wilson, on September 8, 1884 at Union Church, Tokohama, Japan by the Rev. Eugene S. Booth. They had eight children together, and seven of them were born in China during their mission work there. After his wife died in 1913, he married Dr. Mary Newell.

== Death ==
Reverend Samuel Woodbridge died in Shanghai, China, on July 23, 1926, where he is buried.
