= Elizabeth Avery =

English prophet (fl.1614–1653)

Elizabeth Avery or Elizabeth Parker (fl. 1614–1653) was an English prophet. She came from a religious family and disputed theological matters with her brother Thomas Parker.

== Life ==
Avery's family lived at Stanton St Bernard in Wiltshire. She was one of the three children of the Revd. Robert Parker and Dorothy Stevens. Her father was Stanton St. Bernard's vicar and prebendary. He was removed by his bishop in 1607 after publishing his views that certain religious ideas were anti-Christian; for example, he stated the sign of the cross should be avoided. By 1612 the whole family were in the Netherlands. Elizabeth reported that she thought her father godly and that she was given a good education.

Avery published Scripture-prophecies opened, which are to be accomplished in these last times, which do attend the second coming of Christ, concerning theology and prophesy, in 1647. This was in the year following a publication by her brother, Thomas Parker about theology. He published his objections to her ideas in The copy of a letter written by Thomas Parker, pastor of the church of Newbury in New England, to his sister, Mrs Elizabeth Avery in 1650. He was annoyed not so much by the content of her writings but more by the idea that his sister could publish her ideas at all. He admitted that he had not read her 1647 publication when he wrote "your printing of a book beyond the custom of your sex, doth rankly smell".
