= Nicholas Noyes =

American colonial minister (1647–1717)

Rev. Nicholas Noyes II (December 22, 1647 at Newbury, Massachusetts Bay Colony – December 13, 1717 at Salem, Massachusetts Bay Colony) was a colonial minister during the time of the Salem witch trials. He was the second minister, called the "Teacher", to Rev. John Higginson. During the Salem witch trials, Rev. Noyes served as the official minister of the trials.

== Biography ==
Rev. Nicholas Noyes II was the son of Rev. Nicholas Noyes and Mary Cutting Noyes, grandson of the Rev. William Noyes, and nephew of Rev. James Noyes. He graduated at Harvard in 1667, and, after preaching thirteen years in Haddam, Connecticut, he moved in 1683 to Salem, where he was minister until his death in Salem. He spent time as the chaplain with troops in Connecticut during King Philip's War in 1675–76.

Before the execution of Sarah Good on July 19, 1692, Noyes asked her to confess. According to legend, she yelled to him: "I'm no more a witch than you are a wizard, and if you take away my life God will give you blood to drink", although this sentence does not appear in any of contemporary reports of the execution. There is also a legend that, twenty-five years later, Noyes died from choking on his own blood.

On September 22, 1692, Noyes had officiated as clergyman at the final hangings of those accused of witchcraft. It is reported that he turned toward the suspended bodies of the victims and said, "What a sad thing it is to see eight firebrands of hell hanging there."

On November 14, 1692, 17-year-old Mary Herrick accused Noyes's cousin, Sarah Noyes Hale (wife of John Hale, daughter of Reverend James Noyes, granddaughter of Rev. William Noyes, and great grandmother of renowned patriot Nathan Hale), and the ghost of executed Mary Eastey of afflicting her, but unsurprisingly Sarah Noyes Hale was never formally charged or arrested. A later commentator on the trials, Charles Upham suggests that this accusation was one that helped turn public opinion to end the prosecutions, and spurred John Hale's willingness to reconsider his support of the trials.

Some sources claim Noyes later retracted his opinions on the witch trials, and publicly confessed his error, but an entirely unflattering portrait of Noyes as an active persecutor of the accused witches in the examinations prior to their trials is presented by Frances Hill in her book, A Delusion of Satan. A 1703 petition to clear the names of the accused witches, signed by Essex County ministers, did not include Noyes' name. In 1712, the excommunications of Rebecca Nurse and Giles Corey were reversed by the Salem Church "... as a result of pressure from Samuel Nurse rather from any remorse on the part of Nicholas Noyes."

Noyes published Election Sermon (1698), and, later (1715), a poem on the death of Joseph Green, as well as some verses prefixed to Cotton Mather's Magnalia.

Upon Noyes' death in 1717, an elegy was prepared by Reverend Samuel Phillips of Andover.
