= Frederick Woodbridge =

Frederick Woodbridge may refer to:

- Frederick Woodbridge (cricketer) (1797–1858), English amateur cricketer
- Frederick E. Woodbridge (1818–1888), American politician and lawyer from Vermont
- Frederick James Eugene Woodbridge (1867-1940), American philosopher and academic
- Frederick James Woodbridge (1900–1974), American architect
