= Israel Williams =

American judge and educator (1709–1788)

Israel Williams (1709–1788) was an American educator and judge who founded Williams College in 1793 by bequest of Ephraim Williams. Williams and John Worthington were the executors of the will.

Israel Williams was half-brother of Elisha Williams.
