= James Noyes House =

Historic house in Massachusetts, United States

- U.S. National Register of Historic Places
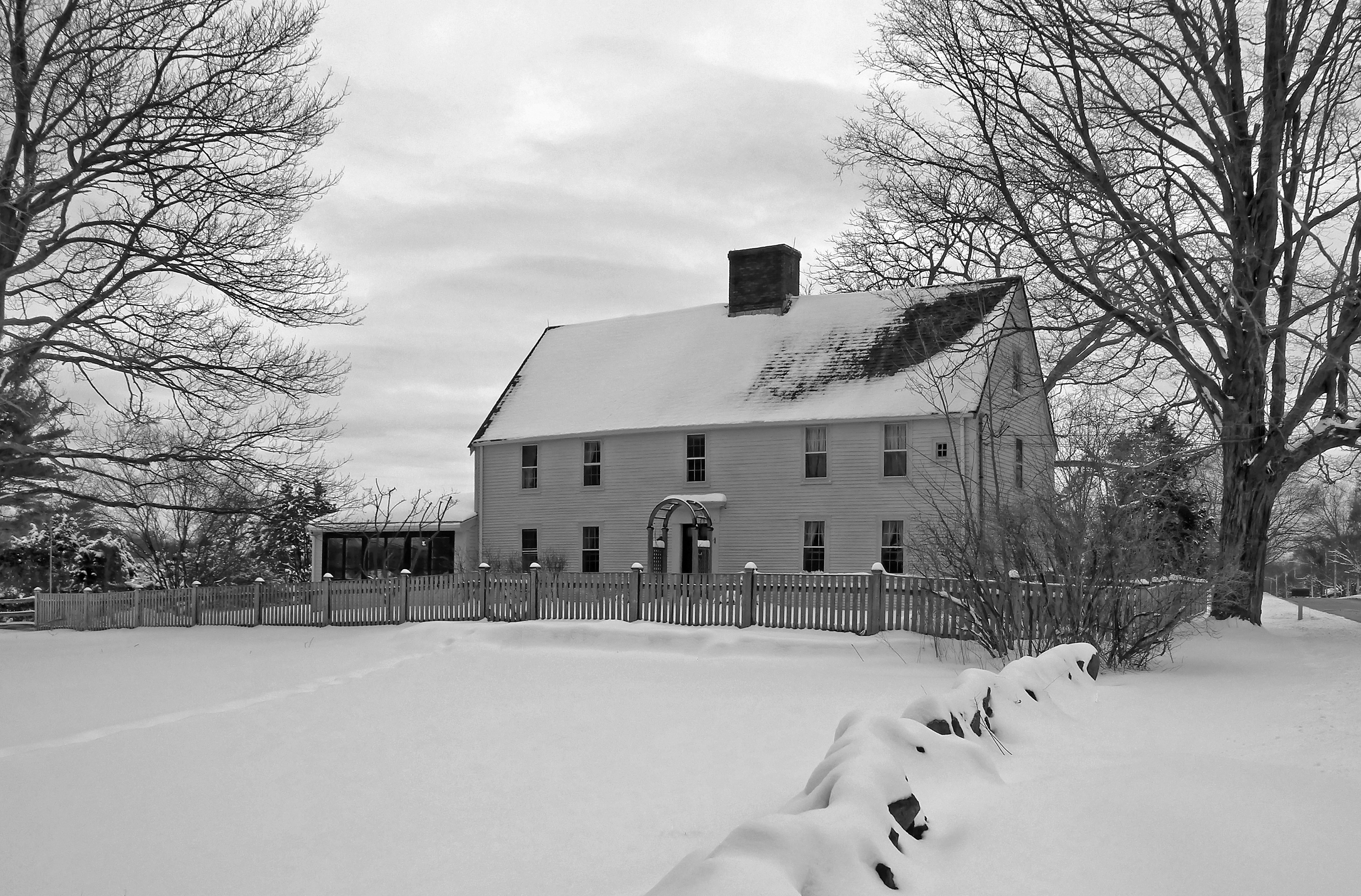
- The James Noyes House

- Location within Massachusetts Location within the United States
- Location: 7 Parker Street, Newbury, Massachusetts
- Coordinates: 42°47′51″N 70°51′46″W
- Built: ca. 1675
- Architectural style: Colonial
- MPS: First Period Buildings of Eastern Massachusetts TR
- NRHP reference No.: 90000246
- Added to NRHP: March 9, 1990

The James Noyes House is a historic First Period house at 7 Parker Street in Newbury, Massachusetts, United States. The house was built by the Reverend James Noyes, a Puritan pastor, who settled in Newbury in the mid-17th century. The Noyes family came from Wiltshire in England. The house appears to date from the second half of the 17th century; without successful dendrochronology, a narrower window of time is not possible to establish. It has been thought to be among the earliest surviving First Period houses because its roof frame resembled that of the Coffin House, long thought to date to 1654, dendrochronology proved that house, now owned by Historic New England to be no earlier than 1678. It was added to the National Register of Historic Places in 1990.

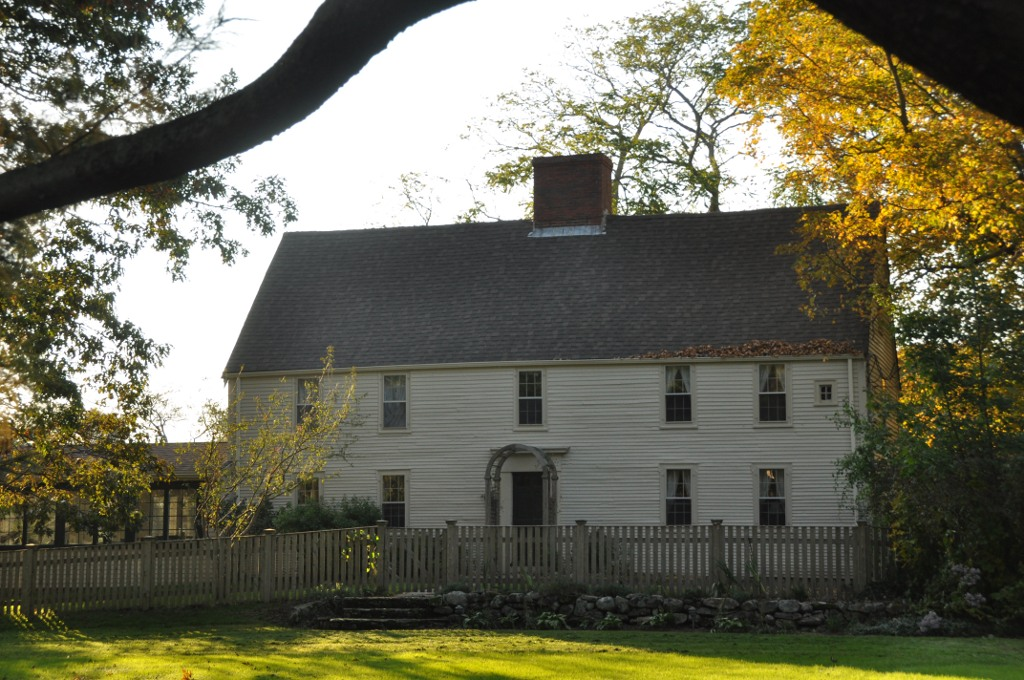
The house in 2012

The main block of the house is a 2 1/2-story wood-frame structure, five bays wide, with a large central chimney. When the house was first built, it was only a single room deep; around 1800 a 2 1/2-story cross-gable ell was added to the rear, which was further extended by a 1 1/2-story ell later in the 19th century. The interior rooms of the main block have Federal period styling, probably dating to the time of the first addition.

== See also ==
- First Period houses in Massachusetts (1620–1659)
- List of the oldest buildings in Massachusetts
- National Register of Historic Places listings in Essex County, Massachusetts
