= Cholderton =

Village in Wiltshire, England

Coordinates: 51.180°N 1.679°W

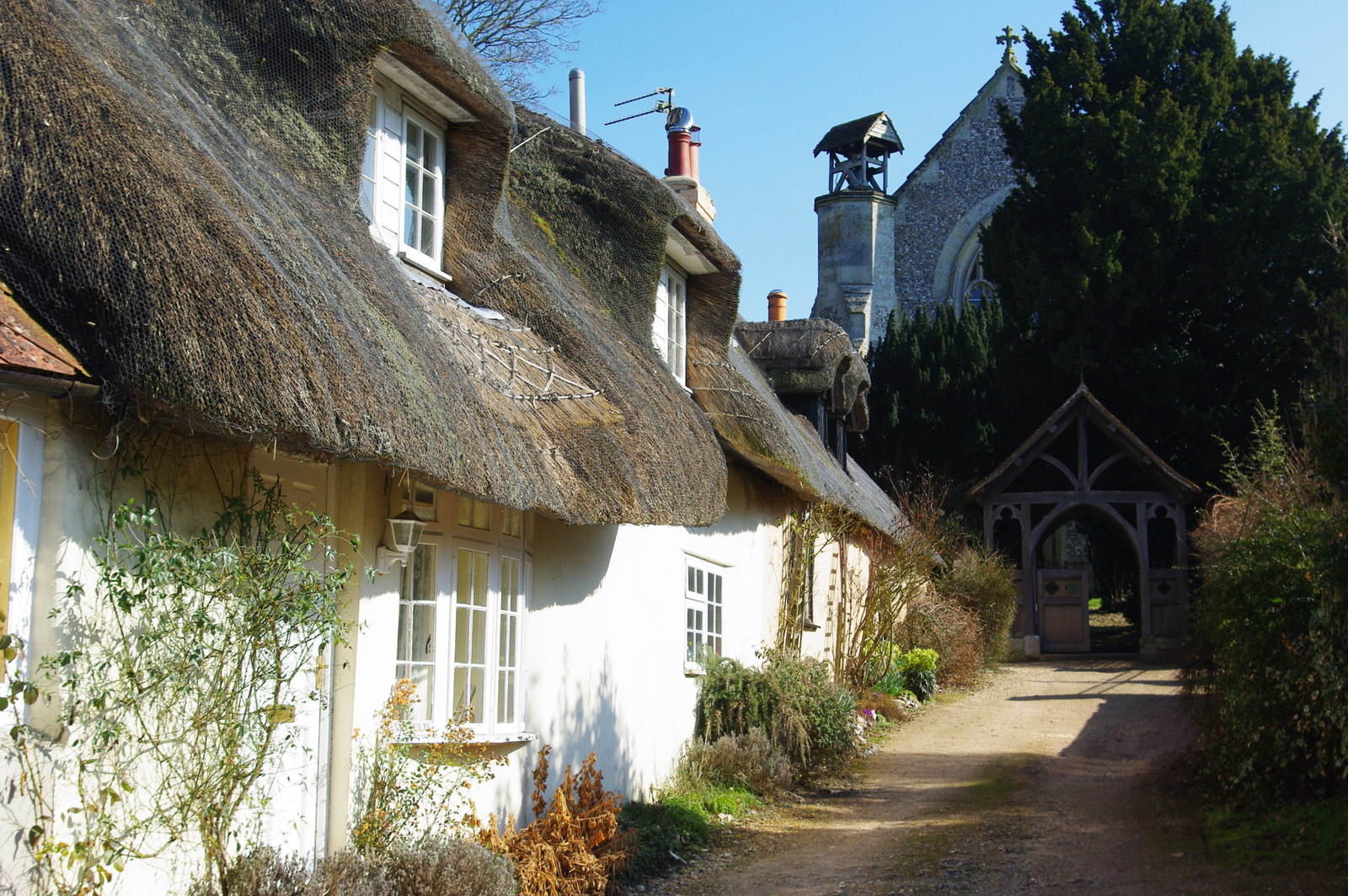
- Cottages and church, Cholderton

- Location within Wiltshire
- Population: 185 (in 2011)
- OS grid reference: SU225424
- Civil parish: Cholderton
- Unitary authority: Wiltshire
- Ceremonial county: Wiltshire
- Region: South West
- Country: England
- Sovereign state: United Kingdom
- Post town: Salisbury
- Postcode district: SP4
- Dialling code: 01980
- Police: Wiltshire
- Fire: Dorset and Wiltshire
- Ambulance: South Western
- UK Parliament: Salisbury

Cholderton, or more properly West Cholderton, is a village and civil parish in the Bourne Valley of Wiltshire, England. The village is about 4 miles (6 km) east of the town of Amesbury. It is on the A338, about 1 mile (1.6 km) south of the A303 trunk road and 9 miles (14 km) northeast of Salisbury.

East Cholderton is part of Amport parish, over the county border in Hampshire.

Local attractions include Cholderton Rare Breeds Farm, a Rare Breeds Survival Trust approved farm park.

== Notable people ==
Henry Charles Stephens, a businessman from Finchley in north London and Member of Parliament, owned an estate in Cholderton and in 1904 by Act of Parliament set up the Cholderton and District Water Company which serves a small area of Hampshire and Wiltshire. His descendants still live in the village.

== Notable buildings ==
Cholderton House (built 1690) and the Manor House (circa 1710) are Grade II* listed. It was built "probably for Jonathan Hill, merchant, of Salisbury, altered C18 and extended in C19" according to the listing. The current structure is a 21st-century building that replaced the 17th-century house extensively damaged in a 2012 fire. In 2021, the building was described as having a "restored, late-17th-century William-and-Mary façade" by Country Life magazine and the property featured many equestrian facilities.

The Manor House is described in its listing as "Farm house, now house. c1710 ... with service extension to left added 1732, and wing on right, set back and extending to rear, built c1931". By 2019, a news item about the house stated that it had been extensively restored, and the property included a swimming "pool, and a paddock, as well as stables, and a tennis court". The report stated that the current building includes a 20th-century addition, presumably from 1931.

=== Parish Church of St Nicholas ===
In the 1840s two churches stood on this site, side by side. The smaller being the old Saxon church deemed in need of replacement by the then Rector, Reverend Thomas Mozley and his wife Harriet, the sister of Cardinal Newman. Mozley laid the foundation stone for the larger building in 1841 and the new church was completed in 1850. Mozley directed the project, the architect was Thomas Henry Wyatt and the builder, John Crook of West Dean. The new church cost over £6000, of which Mozley contributed over £5000. In contrast, the demolition of the old church cost £11. In 1958 the church was designated as Grade II* listed. The parish is now part of the Bourne Valley grouping.

Thomas Mozley was a supporter of the High Church Tractarian movement and in 1841 succeeded Newman as editor of its periodical, the British Critic. Other notable rectors include William Noyes (from 1601), James Fraser (1847-1860; later Bishop of Manchester) and Frank McGowan (to 1951; became Archdeacon of Sarum).
