= Stanton Fitzwarren =

Village in Wiltshire, England

Coordinates: 51.613°N 1.745°W

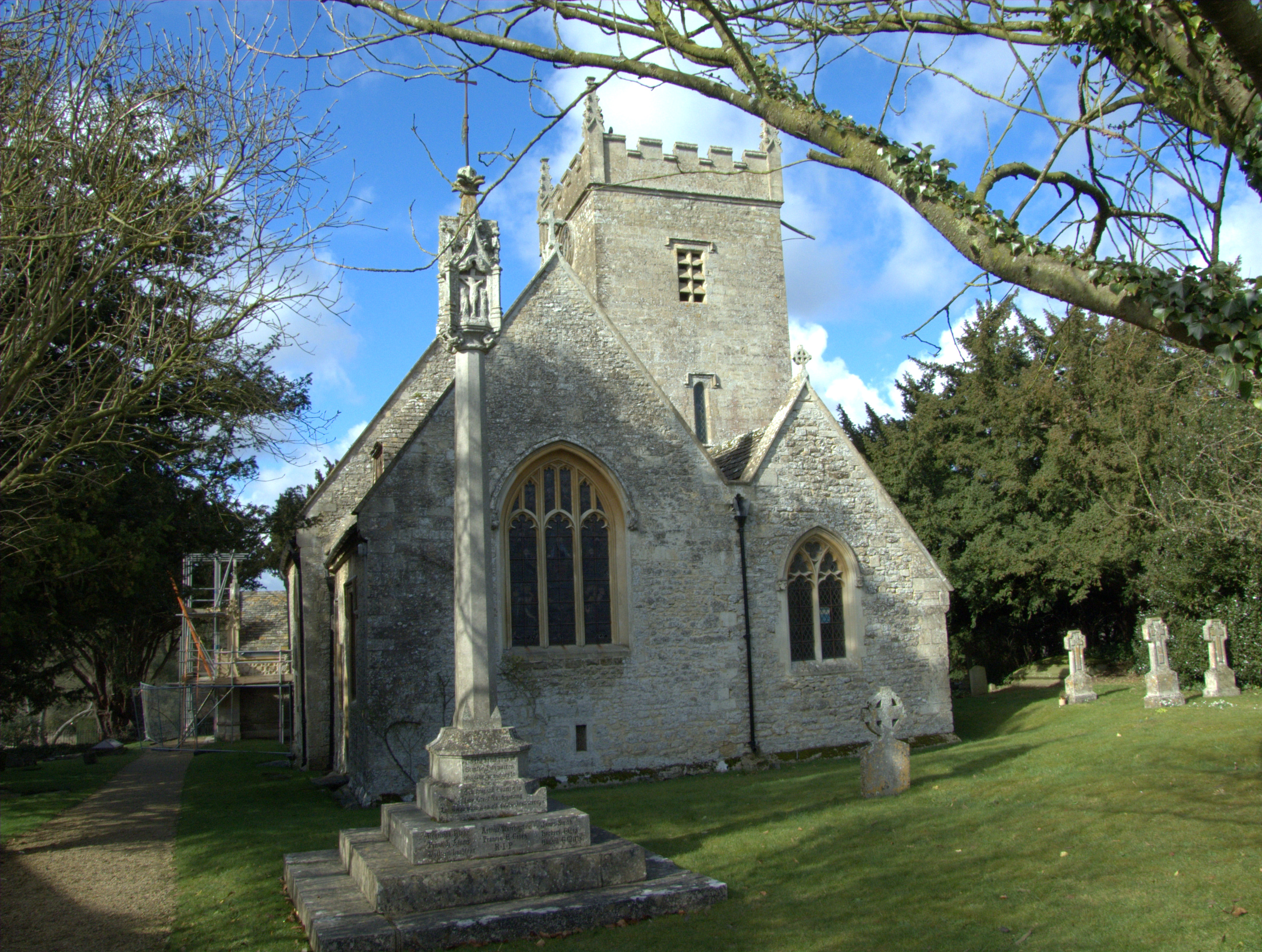
- St Leonard's church

- Location within Wiltshire
- Population: 228 (in 2021)
- OS grid reference: SU1790
- Civil parish: Stanton Fitzwarren
- Unitary authority: Swindon
- Ceremonial county: Wiltshire
- Region: South West
- Country: England
- Sovereign state: United Kingdom
- Post town: Swindon
- Postcode district: SN6
- Dialling code: 01793
- Police: Wiltshire
- Fire: Dorset and Wiltshire
- Ambulance: South Western
- UK Parliament: Swindon North
- Website: Parish Council

Stanton Fitzwarren is a village and civil parish 3 miles (4.8 km) north-east of Swindon, in Wiltshire, England. It is within the area of the unitary authority of Swindon.

== Parish church ==
The Grade I listed Church of England parish church of Saint Leonard has Norman origins: the north and south doorways, the chancel arch and a window in the north wall survive from this period. The cylindrical font is an important Norman sculpture depicting eight virtues, eight vices, the Church, the Evil One and a six-winged seraph. The Norman building had an apse, of which the foundations were discovered during restoration work in 1865. The chancel was rebuilt in the 14th century with a flat east wall and east window. The bell tower was added in 1631.

St. Leonard's restoration (1865) was completed by the Gothic Revival architect J.W. Hugall. In 1891 the nave was lengthened westwards and the south porch was added. During one of the 19th century rebuildings a new east window was inserted in the chancel and the 14th century one was re-used as the centrepiece of a folly in the grounds of Stanton House. St. Leonard's parish is now part of a single Church of England benefice with the parishes of South Marston and Stratton St Margaret.

== Railway ==
The Swindon and Highworth Light Railway – from the Great Western Main Line at Swindon to Highworth – was built through Stanton Fitzwarren in 1879–81, although the original company was unable to open the line and sold it to the Great Western Railway (GWR) in 1882. In 1883 the GWR finally opened the line to traffic, with three intermediate stations including one at Mill Lane, in the north of the village.

Neither passenger nor goods traffic was high, but activity increased during both world wars. From 1916, timber was taken from Stanton Big Wood; and from the late 1930s the station provided access for the building of the aircraft factory at South Marston (later taken over by Vickers-Armstrongs), although this traffic ceased after a spur into the factory was built in the early 1940s. The station also served army camps in the area.

British Railways withdrew passenger services in 1953, apart from workmen's trains that it continued to run until 1962. Most of the line, including the section through Stanton, was then dismantled.

== Stanton House ==
Stanton House was built just south of the church in 1935, in traditional Cotswold style, for a New York businessman; at the same time a 19th-century cottage at the north entrance to the site was repurposed as a lodge. The house is now a hotel.

== Amenities ==
Stanton has a village hall.

== Sources ==
- Pevsner, Nikolaus; Cherry, Bridget (revision) (1975). The Buildings of England: Wiltshire. Harmondsworth: Penguin Books. pp. 477–478. ISBN 0-14-071026-4.
