= John Woodbridge =

English nonconformist

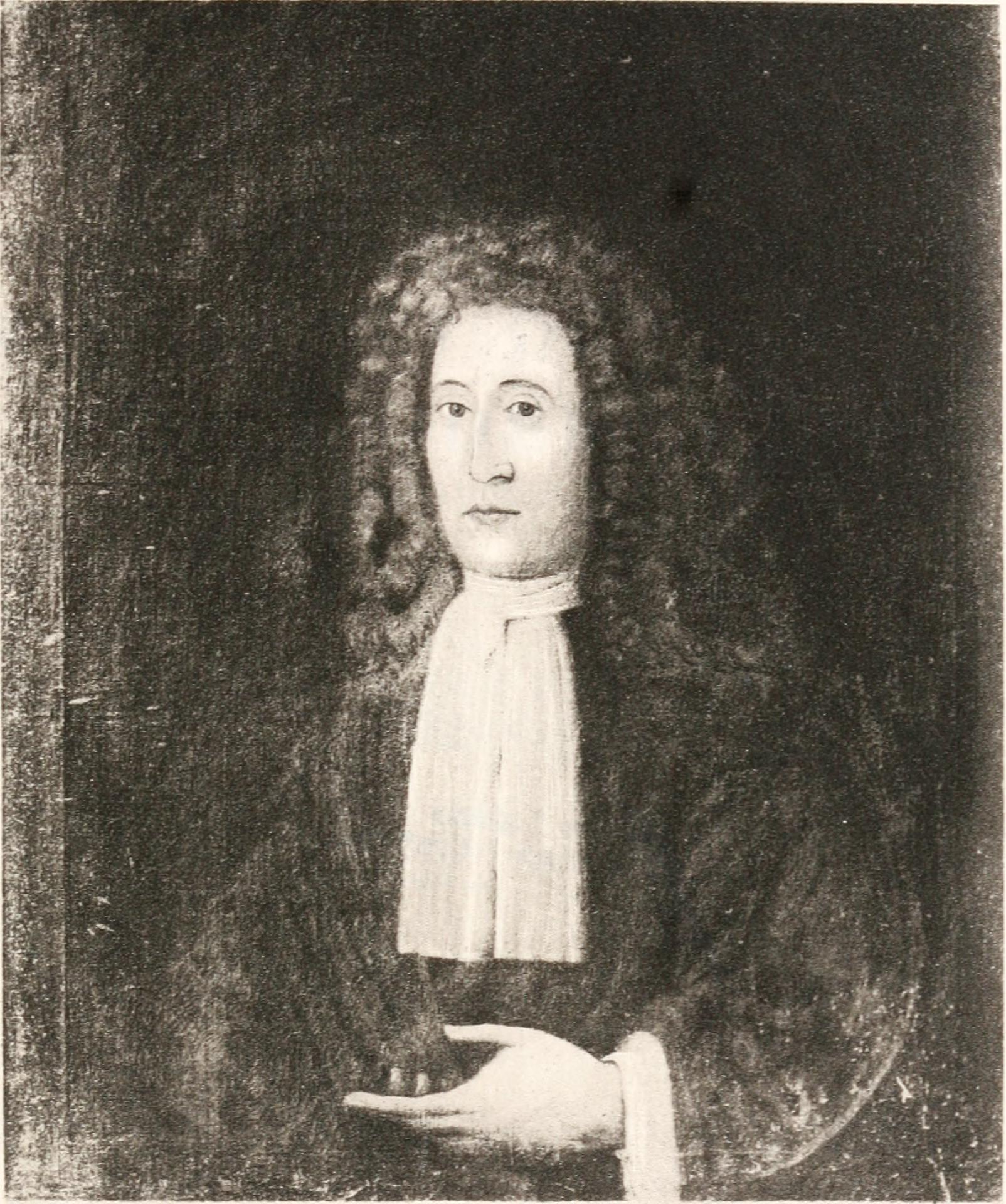
- Born: 1613
- Died: 1696
- Occupation: Minister
- Spouse: Mercy Dudley
- Children: 12

John Woodbridge VI (1613–1696) was an English nonconformist, who emigrated to New England. He had positions on both sides of the Atlantic, until 1663, when he settled permanently in New England.

== Life ==
John Woodbridge VI was born at Stanton, near Highworth, England, in 1613 to Rev. John Woodbridge V (1582–1637) and Sarah Parker. John was sixth in a line of men by the same name—all ministers—the first of whom, Rev. John Woodbridge I, was a follower of John Wycliffe, a 14th-century translator of the Bible. He studied at the University of Oxford, but, objecting to the oath of conformity, left the university and studied privately until 1634, when he immigrated to America. Woodbridge took up lands at Newbury, Massachusetts, where he acted as first town clerk until 19 November 1638. In 1637, 1640 and 1641 he served as deputy to the general court.

In 1641 Woodbridge of Newbury purchased the land "about Cochichewick" that had been reserved by a vote of the General Court in 1634. He led a group of settlers there in 1641. The settlers named the town Andover because some of them came from Andover, Hampshire, in England. Woodbridge was ordained at Andover, Massachusetts, on 24 October 1645 and was chosen teacher of a congregation at Newbury. Cotton Mather said of him:

The town of Andover then first peeping into the world, he was, by the hands of Mr. Wilson and Mr. Worcester, ordained the teacher of a Congregation there. There he continued with good reputation, discharging the duties of the ministry until, upon the invitation of friends, he returned once more to England.

In 1647, Woodbridge returned to England and was made chaplain to the commissioners for the Treaty of Newport, in the Isle of Wight. On this journey he carried a manuscript of poetry by his sister-in-law Anne Bradstreet without her knowledge. He had it published in London as The Tenth Muse Lately Sprung Up into America, by a Gentlewoman in such Parts. The publication appears to have been an attempt by Puritan men (Thomas Dudley, Simon Bradstreet, and Woodbridge) to show that a godly and educated woman could elevate the position held by a wife and mother, without necessarily placing her in competition with men. The publication was though unauthorized and reportedly, on the publication of Anne Bradstreet's The Tenth Muse (1650), he wrote:

I feare the displeasure of no person in the publishing of these Poems but the Author's, without whose knowledge, and contrary to her expectation, I have presumed to bring to publick view what she resolved should never in such as manner see the Sun.

Woodbridge settled in New England in 1663 and became teacher and assistant pastor to his uncle Reverend Thomas Parker, M.A. as minister at Newbury. Disagreeing with his congregation on some points of church discipline, he gave up his post in 1672 and became a magistrate of the township. He died on 17 March 1696.

== Family ==
John Woodbridge married Mercy Dudley, daughter of Governor Thomas Dudley and sister of Anne Bradstreet, on May 20, 1639, probably in Newbury, Massachusetts. They had twelve children, including a son John born in 1644 who married Abigail Leete, a daughter of Connecticut Governor William Leete. The town of Woodbridge, Connecticut is named after one of John and Abigail's grandsons, Rev. Benjamin Woodbidge (1712–1785), a son of John Woodbridge and Jemina Eliot. Dudley Woodbridge, judge-advocate of Barbados and director-general of the Royal Assiento Company, who died on 11 February 1721, and whose portrait was painted by Kneller, was probably another son of John and Mercy Woodbridge.

Woodbridge's younger brother Benjamin Woodbridge, who went to Massachusetts a few years after him, was the first graduate of Harvard College in 1642.
